= National Register of Historic Places listings in Lancaster County, Pennsylvania =

Location of Lancaster County in Pennsylvania

This is a list of the National Register of Historic Places listings in Lancaster County, Pennsylvania.

This is intended to be a complete list of the properties and districts on the National Register of Historic Places in Lancaster County, Pennsylvania, United States. The locations of National Register properties and districts for which the latitude and longitude coordinates are included below, may be seen in a map.

There are 209 properties and districts listed on the National Register in the county. The city of Lancaster is the location of 57 of these properties and districts; they are listed separately, while the 153 properties and districts in the other parts of the county are listed here. One property straddles the Lancaster city limits and appears on both lists. Another three sites are further designated as National Historic Landmarks. Yet another property was once listed but has been removed.

This National Park Service list is complete through NPS recent listings posted May 1, 2026.

== Current listings ==
=== Exclusive of Lancaster ===
	Name on the Register	Image	Date listed	Location	Municipality	Description
1	Abbeville	Abbeville	December 14, 1978 (#78002414)	1140 Columbia Avenue; 40°02′16″N 76°20′07″W	Lancaster Township	
2	Andrews Bridge Historic District	Andrews Bridge Historic District	December 22, 1988 (#88003046)	Junction of Pennsylvania Route 896 and Sproul and Creek Roads; 39°52′15″N 76°00′20″W	Colerain Township	
3	Ashley and Bailey Silk Mill	Ashley and Bailey Silk Mill	June 27, 1980 (#80003533)	East Walnut and Pine Streets; 40°03′33″N 76°32′51″W	Marietta	
4	Bachman and Forry Tobacco Warehouse	Bachman and Forry Tobacco Warehouse	March 29, 1979 (#79002252)	125 Bank Alley; 40°01′45″N 76°30′10″W	Columbia	
5	Bangor Episcopal Church	Bangor Episcopal Church	April 30, 1987 (#87000664)	Northwestern corner of Main and Water Streets, Churchtown; 40°08′01″N 75°57′42″W	Caernarvon Township	
6	Baumgardner's Mill Covered Bridge	Baumgardner's Mill Covered Bridge	December 11, 1980 (#80003541)	Southwest of Willow Street on Township 425; 39°55′50″N 76°17′44″W	Martic and Pequea Townships	
7	Bausman Farmstead	Bausman Farmstead	August 30, 1994 (#94001061)	1630 and 1631 Pennsylvania Route 999 (Millersville Pike); 40°01′18″N 76°20′00″W	Lancaster Township	
8	John Berger & Son Company Tobacco Warehouse	John Berger & Son Company Tobacco Warehouse	August 1, 2014 (#14000468)	191 Broad St. 40°05′52″N 76°24′48″W	East Hempfield Township	
9	Big and Little Indian Rock Petroglyphs	Big and Little Indian Rock Petroglyphs	April 3, 1978 (#78002421)	In the Susquehanna River, south of Safe Harbor; 39°55′15″N 76°23′05″W	Conestoga Township	
10	Bird-in-Hand Hotel	Bird-in-Hand Hotel	July 24, 1992 (#92000950)	2695 Old Philadelphia Pike (Pennsylvania Route 340), Bird-in-Hand; 40°02′19″N 76°10′48″W	East Lampeter Township	
11	Bitzer's Mill Covered Bridge	Bitzer's Mill Covered Bridge	December 11, 1980 (#80003516)	Southeast of Ephrata on Legislative Route 36122; 40°08′25″N 76°09′08″W	West Earl Township	
12	Bowmansville Roller Mill	Bowmansville Roller Mill	January 19, 1990 (#89001821)	Junction of Pennsylvania Route 625 and Von Nieda Street, Bowmansville; 40°11′24″N 76°00′43″W	Brecknock Township	
13	Bridge in West Earl Township	Bridge in West Earl Township	June 22, 1988 (#88000875)	Legislative Route 36032 over Conestoga Creek, Brownstown; 40°07′42″N 76°12′01″W	West Earl Township	
14	George Brown's Sons Cotton and Woolen Mill	George Brown's Sons Cotton and Woolen Mill	July 21, 1995 (#95000881)	324–360 East Main Street; 40°06′32″N 76°29′47″W	Mount Joy	
15	Bucher Thal Historic District	Bucher Thal Historic District	December 31, 1987 (#87002207)	Weaver Road; 40°13′33″N 76°07′57″W	East Cocalico Township	
16	James Buchanan House	James Buchanan House	October 15, 1966 (#66000669)	1120 Marietta Avenue; 40°02′36″N 76°19′49″W	Lancaster Township	
17	Joseph Bucher House	Joseph Bucher House	September 7, 1979 (#79002260)	104 East Front St; 40°03′19″N 76°33′17″W	Marietta	
18	Buck Hill Farm Covered Bridge	Buck Hill Farm Covered Bridge	December 10, 1980 (#80003528)	South of Lititz, east of Pennsylvania Route 501, near Lititz; 40°07′55″N 76°18′03″W	Warwick Township	
19	Butcher's Mill Covered Bridge	Butcher's Mill Covered Bridge	December 11, 1980 (#80003514)	South of Denver on Township 955, East Cocalico Township; 40°12′28″N 76°08′05″W	Denver	
20	Byers-Muma House	Byers-Muma House	February 22, 2002 (#02000070)	1402 Trout Run Road; 40°05′12″N 76°33′04″W	East Donegal Township	
21	Caernarvon Presbyterian Church	Caernarvon Presbyterian Church	August 18, 2015 (#15000534)	2148 Main St. 40°08′02″N 75°57′28″W	Caernarvon Township	
22	Cameron Estate	Cameron Estate	November 3, 1975 (#75001646)	2 miles (3.2 km) west of Mount Joy on Donegal Springs Road; 40°06′10″N 76°34′00″W	East Donegal Township	
23	Central Hotel	Central Hotel	June 4, 1973 (#73001637)	102 North Market Street; 40°06′41″N 76°30′12″W	Mount Joy	
24	Chickies Historic District	Chickies Historic District	December 28, 2005 (#05001488)	Roughly bounded by the Susquehanna River, Chickies Creek, Bank Street and Long Lane; 40°03′27″N 76°31′35″W	East Donegal Township, West Hempfield Township, and Marietta	
25	Colemanville Covered Bridge	Colemanville Covered Bridge	December 11, 1980 (#80003534)	Northeast of Pequea on Township 408; 39°53′55″N 76°20′32″W	Conestoga and Martic Townships	
26	Columbia Historic District	Columbia Historic District	May 6, 1983 (#83002249)	Roughly bounded by the Susquehanna River, Union, Cedar, 4th, and 5th Streets, Chestnut to 9th Street; 40°02′02″N 76°30′12″W	Columbia	
27	Columbia Wagon Works	Columbia Wagon Works	February 2, 2001 (#01000057)	920 Plane Street; 40°01′29″N 76°29′35″W	Columbia	
28	Combination Baggage and Mail Car No. 5403	Combination Baggage and Mail Car No. 5403	December 17, 1979 (#79002261)	Railroad Museum of Pennsylvania; 39°58′56″N 76°09′40″W	Strasburg Township	
29	Conestoga Town	Conestoga Town	June 18, 1973 (#73001636)	Junction of Safe Harbor and Indian Marker Roads; 39°57′35″N 76°24′01″W	Manor Township	
30	Congregational Store	Congregational Store	January 6, 1983 (#83002250)	120–122 East Main Street; 40°09′23″N 76°18′14″W	Lititz	
31	Connell Mansion	Connell Mansion	January 19, 1979 (#79002254)	249 West Main Street; 40°10′51″N 76°10′53″W	Ephrata	
32	Consolidation Freight Locomotive No. 1187	Consolidation Freight Locomotive No. 1187	December 17, 1979 (#79002262)	Railroad Museum of Pennsylvania; 39°58′56″N 76°09′40″W	Strasburg Township	
33	Consolidation Freight Locomotive No. 2846	Consolidation Freight Locomotive No. 2846	December 17, 1979 (#79002263)	Railroad Museum of Pennsylvania; 39°58′56″N 76°09′40″W	Strasburg Township	
34	Consolidation Freight Locomotive No. 7688	Consolidation Freight Locomotive No. 7688	December 17, 1979 (#79002264)	Railroad Museum of Pennsylvania; 39°58′56″N 76°09′40″W	Strasburg Township	
35	Cumberland Valley Car	Cumberland Valley Car	December 17, 1979 (#79002265)	Railroad Museum of Pennsylvania; 39°58′56″N 76°09′40″W	Strasburg Township	
36	Edward Davies House	Edward Davies House	September 6, 1991 (#91001122)	West of Water Street on the southern side of Pennsylvania Route 23, Churchtown; 40°08′01″N 75°57′38″W	Caernarvon Township	
37	David Davis Farm	David Davis Farm	August 30, 1994 (#94001060)	737 Spruce Road; 40°07′23″N 76°04′46″W	Earl Township	
38	DDI Electric Locomotive No. 36	DDI Electric Locomotive No. 36	December 17, 1979 (#79002266)	Railroad Museum of Pennsylvania; 39°58′56″N 76°09′40″W	Strasburg Township	
39	Michael Dohner Farmhouse	Michael Dohner Farmhouse	June 27, 1980 (#80003523)	South of U.S. Route 30, east of the intersection with Pennsylvania Route 896; 40°01′39″N 76°13′49″W	East Lampeter Township	
40	Donegal Mills Plantation	Donegal Mills Plantation	January 20, 1978 (#78002418)	Southwest of Mount Joy on Trout Run Road; 40°05′06″N 76°32′26″W	East Donegal Township	
41	Donegal Presbyterian Church Complex	Donegal Presbyterian Church Complex	July 2, 1985 (#85001482)	Donegal Springs Road; 40°06′04″N 76°34′00″W	East Donegal Township	
42	John Douglass House	John Douglass House	September 5, 1990 (#90001411)	Sproul Road, south of Pennsylvania Route 896, Kirkwood; 39°51′55″N 76°00′30″W	Colerain Township	
43	Duncan Island (36LA60,61)	Duncan Island (36LA60,61)	May 10, 1984 (#84003428)	In the Susquehanna River; 39°51′41″N 76°21′49″W	Martic Township	
44	Eby Shoe Corporation	Eby Shoe Corporation	August 18, 1989 (#89001050)	136 North State Street; 40°10′50″N 76°10′29″W	Ephrata	
45	Ephrata Cloister	Ephrata Cloister	December 24, 1967 (#67000026)	Junction of U.S. Routes 222 and 322; 40°10′59″N 76°11′21″W	Ephrata	
46	Ephrata Commercial Historic District	Ephrata Commercial Historic District	November 8, 2006 (#06001005)	Portions of West Main, East Main, North State, South State Streets, and Washington Avenue; 40°10′41″N 76°10′39″W	Ephrata	
47	Erb's Covered Bridge	Erb's Covered Bridge	December 10, 1980 (#80003536)	North of Rothsville on Township 634; 40°10′03″N 76°14′39″W	Ephrata and Warwick Township	
48	Ann Cunningham Evans House	Ann Cunningham Evans House	May 9, 2002 (#02000475)	6132 Twenty-eighth Division Highway; 40°06′44″N 75°59′00″W	Caernarvon Township	
49	Flat Car No. 473567	Flat Car No. 473567	December 17, 1979 (#79002267)	Railroad Museum of Pennsylvania; 39°58′56″N 76°09′40″W	Strasburg Township	This flat car is outside the main train yard; the numbers on the side are extremely weathered and barely legible.
50	Forry's Mill Covered Bridge	Forry's Mill Covered Bridge	December 11, 1980 (#80003512)	Northeast of Columbia on Township 362, Rapho/West Hempfield Townships; 40°03′59″N 76°28′42″W	Rapho and West Hempfield Townships	
51	Freight Locomotive No. 5741	Freight Locomotive No. 5741	December 17, 1979 (#79002268)	Railroad Museum of Pennsylvania; 39°58′56″N 76°09′40″W	Strasburg Township	
52	Frey-Haverstick Site (36LA6)	Frey-Haverstick Site (36LA6)	January 15, 1986 (#86000819)	Eastern side of the Susquehanna River, north of Staman's Run; 39°59′42″N 76°28′14″W	Washington Boro	
53	Robert Fulton Birthplace	Robert Fulton Birthplace	October 15, 1966 (#66000670)	8 miles (13 km) south of Quarryville on U.S. Route 222; 39°48′17″N 76°09′37″W	Fulton Township	
54	Furnace Hills Tenant House	Furnace Hills Tenant House	May 20, 2005 (#05000451)	Unpaved road approximately 500 feet (150 m) east of Project Drive; 40°15′55″N 76°12′21″W	West Cocalico Township	
55	John B. Good House	John B. Good House	February 8, 1980 (#80003507)	Pennsylvania Route 625 in Bowmansville; 40°11′48″N 76°01′03″W	Brecknock Township	
56	Grove Mansion	Grove Mansion	April 21, 1983 (#83002251)	133 River Road, Maytown; 40°04′21″N 76°34′49″W	East Donegal Township	
57	Christian Habeck Farm	Christian Habeck Farm	August 30, 1994 (#94001063)	2301 Spring Valley Road; 40°03′41″N 76°21′52″W	East Hempfield Township	
58	Hammer Creek Bridge	Hammer Creek Bridge	June 22, 1988 (#88000872)	Legislative Route 36011 over Hammer Creek; 40°11′48″N 76°16′45″W	Elizabeth and Warwick Townships	
59	Gen. Edward Hand House	Gen. Edward Hand House	November 21, 1976 (#76001646)	881 Rock Ford Road; 40°01′12″N 76°17′17″W	West Lampeter Township	
60	Johannes Harnish Farmstead	Johannes Harnish Farmstead	March 12, 1999 (#99000327)	202 Woodfield Crossing; 40°00′05″N 76°17′11″W	West Lampeter Township	
61	Christian and Emma Herr Farm	Christian and Emma Herr Farm	August 30, 1994 (#94001059)	2131 and 2133 South View Road; 39°58′16″N 76°14′20″W	West Lampeter Township	
62	Hans Herr House	Hans Herr House	May 3, 1971 (#71000708)	1851 Hans Herr Drive; 39°58′48″N 76°15′43″W	West Lampeter Township	
63	Herr's Mill Covered Bridge	Herr's Mill Covered Bridge	December 10, 1980 (#80003537)	Southwest of Soundersburg on Township 696; 40°00′35″N 76°09′44″W	East Lampeter and Paradise Townships	
64	Hibshman Farm	Hibshman Farm	June 27, 1980 (#80003517)	Springville Road; 40°12′18″N 76°10′33″W	Ephrata Township	
65	Kagerise Store and House	Kagerise Store and House	November 3, 1988 (#88002174)	84–86 West Main Street; 40°14′33″N 76°03′30″W	Adamstown	
66	Kauffman's Distillery Covered Bridge	Kauffman's Distillery Covered Bridge	December 11, 1980 (#80003529)	Southwest of Manheim on Township 889; 40°08′53″N 76°24′37″W	Penn and Rapho Townships	
67	Keller's Covered Bridge	Keller's Covered Bridge	December 10, 1980 (#80003518)	Middle Creek Road (TR 660) over Cocalico Creek; 40°09′51″N 76°13′57″W	Ephrata Township	
68	Jacob Keller Farm	Jacob Keller Farm	July 17, 1986 (#86001679)	900 Rettew Mill Road; 40°10′13″N 76°12′21″W	Ephrata Township	
69	Kirks Mills Historic District	Kirks Mills Historic District	July 17, 1978 (#78002420)	West of Nottingham, Chester County off Pennsylvania Route 272; 39°45′11″N 76°06′27″W	Little Britain Township	
70	Kreider Shoe Manufacturing Company	Kreider Shoe Manufacturing Company	June 27, 1980 (#80003515)	155 South Poplar Street; 40°08′56″N 76°36′21″W	Elizabethtown	
71	Lancaster City Historic District	Lancaster City Historic District	September 7, 2001 (#01000956)	Roughly bounded by Liberty Street, Broad Street, Greenwood Avenue, Race Avenue, 40°02′29″N 76°18′25″W	All neighborhoods	Extends into Lancaster
72	Lancaster County House of Employment	Lancaster County House of Employment	April 17, 1980 (#80003525)	900 East King Street; 40°02′17″N 76°17′08″W	Lancaster Township	
73	Landis Mill Covered Bridge	Landis Mill Covered Bridge	December 10, 1980 (#80003526)	Shreiner Station Road near the Park City Center; 40°04′07″N 76°20′42″W	East Hempfield and Manheim Townships	
74	Landis Valley Museum	Landis Valley Museum	January 3, 2000 (#99001578)	2451 Kissel Hill Road; 40°05′36″N 76°16′48″W	Manheim Township	
75	Leaman Place Covered Bridge	Leaman Place Covered Bridge	December 11, 1980 (#80003519)	South of Intercourse on Township 684; 40°00′44″N 76°06′30″W	Leacock and Paradise Townships	
76	Lime Valley Covered Bridge	Lime Valley Covered Bridge	December 10, 1980 (#80003535)	North of Refton on Township 498; 39°57′38″N 76°14′06″W	Strasburg and West Lampeter Townships	
77	Linden House	Linden House	January 6, 1983 (#83002254)	606 East Market Street; 40°03′35″N 76°32′30″W	Marietta	
78	Lititz Moravian Historic District	Lititz Moravian Historic District	May 9, 1986 (#86001030)	Roughly bounded by East Main, Willow and Locust, Marion and Orange, and South Cedar and South and North Broad Streets; 40°09′17″N 76°18′06″W	Lititz	
79	Locomotive No. 6755	Locomotive No. 6755	December 17, 1979 (#01000519)	Railroad Museum of Pennsylvania; 39°58′56″N 76°09′40″W	Strasburg Township	
80	Locust Grove	Locust Grove	August 3, 1977 (#77001171)	South of Bainbridge off Pennsylvania Route 441; 40°04′44″N 76°39′38″W	Conoy Township	
81	Locust Grove Archaeological District		May 28, 2020 (#100003391)	Address Restricted	Bainbridge vicinity	
82	Manheim Borough Historic District	Manheim Borough Historic District	February 4, 2000 (#00000058)	Roughly bounded by Colebrook, Laurel, Fuller Dr., And Fulton Streets; 40°09′45″N 76°23′45″W	Manheim	
83	Manor Street Elementary School	Manor Street Elementary School	April 2, 1987 (#87000572)	Tenth and Manor Streets; 40°01′40″N 76°29′23″W	Columbia	
84	Marietta Historic District	Marietta Historic District	July 18, 1978 (#78002417)	Roughly bounded by Market, Front, Biddle, and Waterford Streets; 40°03′22″N 76°33′28″W	Marietta	
85	Mascot Roller Mills	Mascot Roller Mills	September 29, 1983 (#83002255)	Newport and Stumptown Roads, Mascot; 40°03′46″N 76°09′26″W	Upper Leacock Township	
86	David M. Mayer House	David M. Mayer House	August 31, 2017 (#100001571)	1580 Fruitville Pike; 40°03′54″N 76°18′55″W	Manheim Township	
87	Mentzer Building	Mentzer Building	March 7, 1985 (#85000466)	3 West Main Street; 40°10′47″N 76°10′44″W	Ephrata	
88	Mercer's Mill Covered Bridge	Mercer's Mill Covered Bridge	December 11, 1980 (#80003509)	South of Christiana; 39°55′53″N 75°58′54″W	Sadsbury Township	Extends into Chester County
89	Mikado Freight Locomotive No. 520	Mikado Freight Locomotive No. 520	December 17, 1979 (#79002269)	Railroad Museum of Pennsylvania; 39°58′56″N 76°09′40″W	Strasburg Township	
90	Mount Hope Estate	Mount Hope Estate	December 1, 1980 (#80003530)	Northwest of Manheim on Pennsylvania Route 72; also roughly along Shearer's Creek, east of Mansion House Road and north of the Pennsylvania Turnpike; 40°13′37″N 76°25′47″W	Penn and Rapho Townships	Second set of boundaries represents a boundary increase of September 6, 1991
91	Mountain Springs Hotel	Mountain Springs Hotel	March 2, 1982 (#82003791)	320 East Main Street; 40°10′31″N 76°10′21″W	Ephrata	
92	Samuel N. Mumma Tobacco Warehouse	Samuel N. Mumma Tobacco Warehouse	May 30, 1997 (#97000517)	Elizabeth Street junction with Emily Avenue; 40°05′46″N 76°25′08″W	East Hempfield Township	
93	Murry Site	Murry Site	December 10, 1980 (#80003540)	2 miles (3.2 km) south of Washington Boro; 39°58′44″N 76°27′11″W	Manor Township	
94	Neff's Mill Covered Bridge	Neff's Mill Covered Bridge	December 11, 1980 (#80003538)	West of Strasburg on Township 559; 39°58′43″N 76°13′33″W	Strasburg and West Lampeter Townships	
95	New Holland Machine Company	New Holland Machine Company	August 9, 2000 (#00000846)	146 East Franklin Street; 40°06′03″N 76°05′19″W	New Holland	
96	Nissly Swiss Chocolate Company	Nissly Swiss Chocolate Company	June 28, 1996 (#96000709)	951 Wood Street; 40°06′48″N 76°31′38″W	Mount Joy	
97	Northeast Lancaster Township Historic District	Northeast Lancaster Township Historic District	March 20, 1986 (#86000464)	Roughly bounded by Marietta, Race, and Wheatland Avenues and Wilson Drive; 40°02′32″N 76°19′56″W	Lancaster Township	
98	Old Columbia-Wrightsville Bridge	Old Columbia-Wrightsville Bridge	June 22, 1988 (#88000764)	Legislative Route 128 over the Susquehanna River and a railroad 40°01′50″N 76°30′41″W	Columbia	Extends into York County
99	Oregon Mill Complex	Oregon Mill Complex	June 27, 1985 (#85001389)	1415 Oregon Road; 40°06′48″N 76°15′00″W	Manheim Township	
100	Park Site 36La96	Park Site 36La96	April 4, 1985 (#85000698)	On a knoll in Central Park, midway between the Conestoga River and Mill Creek; 40°01′07″N 76°17′04″W	West Lampeter Township	
101	Passenger and Baggage Car No. 4639	Passenger and Baggage Car No. 4639	December 17, 1979 (#79002276)	Railroad Museum of Pennsylvania; 39°58′56″N 76°09′40″W	Strasburg Township	
102	Passenger Coach No. 3556	Passenger Coach No. 3556	December 17, 1979 (#79002270)	Railroad Museum of Pennsylvania; 39°58′56″N 76°09′40″W	Strasburg Township	
103	Passenger Day Coach No. 8177	Passenger Day Coach No. 8177	December 17, 1979 (#79002271)	Railroad Museum of Pennsylvania; 39°58′56″N 76°09′40″W	Strasburg Township	
104	Passenger Locomotive No. 1223	Passenger Locomotive No. 1223	December 17, 1979 (#79002272)	Railroad Museum of Pennsylvania; 39°58′56″N 76°09′40″W	Strasburg Township	
105	Passenger Locomotive No. 1737	Passenger Locomotive No. 1737	December 17, 1979 (#79002273)	Railroad Museum of Pennsylvania; 39°58′56″N 76°09′40″W	Strasburg Township	
106	Passenger Locomotive No. 460	Passenger Locomotive No. 460	December 17, 1979 (#79002274)	Railroad Museum of Pennsylvania; 39°58′56″N 76°09′40″W	Strasburg Township	
107	Passenger Locomotive No. 7002	Passenger Locomotive No. 7002	December 17, 1979 (#79002275)	Railroad Museum of Pennsylvania; 39°58′56″N 76°09′40″W	Strasburg Township	
108	Pine Grove Covered Bridge	Pine Grove Covered Bridge	December 11, 1980 (#80003521)	Southeast of Kirkwood on Legislative Route 36018; 39°47′37″N 76°02′41″W	Little Britain Township	Extends into Chester County
109	Pinetown Covered Bridge	Pinetown Covered Bridge	December 11, 1980 (#80003527)	East of Lancaster on Township 620; 40°06′20″N 76°14′55″W	Upper Leacock and Manheim Townships	
110	Pool Forge Covered Bridge	Pool Forge Covered Bridge	December 11, 1980 (#80003510)	Northwest of Churchtown on Township 773; 40°08′27″N 76°00′00″W	Caernarvon Township	
111	Poole Forge	Poole Forge	April 29, 1993 (#93000351)	1936, 1938, 1940 and 1942 Main Street, Narvon; 40°07′50″N 75°58′35″W	Caernarvon Township	
112	Red Run Covered Bridge	Red Run Covered Bridge	December 11, 1980 (#80003539)	Northwest of Terre Hill west of Township 816; 40°10′32″N 76°04′55″W	Brecknock Township	
113	Reinholds Station Trinity Chapel	Reinholds Station Trinity Chapel	September 5, 1990 (#90001412)	114 East Main Street; 40°15′57″N 76°06′45″W	Reinholds	
114	Peter and Catherine Reyer Farmhouse	Peter and Catherine Reyer Farmhouse	November 7, 1996 (#96001314)	Trout Run Road, west of junction with Pennsylvania Route 272; 40°11′39″N 76°10′45″W	Ephrata Township	
115	Roberts Farm Site (36LA1)		April 3, 1986 (#86000830)	On a knoll above the Conestoga River, just before its confluence with the Susquehanna River; 39°56′42″N 76°22′27″W	Manor Township	
116	Siegrist's Mill Covered Bridge	Siegrist's Mill Covered Bridge	December 10, 1980 (#80003513)	Northeast of Columbia on Township 360; 40°04′33″N 76°28′17″W	Rapho and West Hempfield Townships	Damaged by Tropical Storm Lee in 2011
117	Shearer's Covered Bridge	Shearer's Covered Bridge	December 10, 1980 (#80003532)	High School Memorial Park; 40°10′19″N 76°23′25″W	Manheim	
118	Shenk's Mill Covered Bridge	Shenk's Mill Covered Bridge	December 10, 1980 (#80003531)	South of Manheim on Township 372, East Hempfield/Rapho Townships; 40°06′56″N 76°25′32″W	East Hempfield and Rapho Townships	
119	Shenks Ferry Site (36LA2)		March 3, 1982 (#82004655)	Along Grubbs Creek, ¾ mile above the Susquehanna River; 39°54′18″N 76°21′37″W	Martic Township	
120	Shreiner Farm	Shreiner Farm	August 30, 1994 (#94001058)	Oregon Pike north side, .3 miles (0.48 km) east of Suncrest Road; 40°06′03″N 76°15′59″W	Manheim Township	
121	Shultz-Funk Site (36LA7 and 36LA9)	Shultz-Funk Site (36LA7 and 36LA9)	March 3, 1982 (#82003796)	Above the Susquehanna River near Washington Boro, immediately south of Witmer's Run; 39°58′36″N 76°27′34″W	Manor Township	
122	Speedwell Forge	Speedwell Forge	May 24, 2006 (#06000429)	465 Speedwell Forge Road; 40°13′07″N 76°19′51″W	Elizabeth Township	
123	Spring Grove Forge Mansion	Spring Grove Forge Mansion	July 11, 1984 (#84003447)	Spring Grove Road; 40°08′41″N 76°01′17″W	East Earl Township	
124	Christian Stauffer House	Christian Stauffer House	October 16, 1986 (#86002889)	Millcross Road; 40°03′36″N 76°15′17″W	East Lampeter Township	
125	Steel Hopper Car No. 33164	Steel Hopper Car No. 33164	December 17, 1979 (#79002277)	Railroad Museum of Pennsylvania; 39°58′56″N 76°09′40″W	Strasburg Township	
126	Steel Passenger Coach No. 1650	Steel Passenger Coach No. 1650	December 17, 1979 (#79002278)	Railroad Museum of Pennsylvania; 39°58′56″N 76°09′40″W	Strasburg Township	
127	Steel Passenger Coach No. 1651	Steel Passenger Coach No. 1651	December 17, 1979 (#79002279)	Railroad Museum of Pennsylvania; 39°58′56″N 76°09′40″W	Strasburg Township	
128	Stiegel-Coleman House	Stiegel-Coleman House	November 13, 1966 (#66000668)	Pennsylvania Route 501 and U.S. Route 322, Brickerville; 40°14′16″N 76°17′44″W	Elizabeth Township	
129	Stehli Silk Mill	Stehli Silk Mill	April 29, 2014 (#14000195)	701 Martha Avenue; 40°03′16″N 76°17′42″W	Manheim Township	
130	John Casper Stoever Log House	John Casper Stoever Log House	January 6, 1987 (#86003561)	200 West Main Street; 40°06′04″N 76°05′33″W	New Holland	
131	Strasburg Historic District	Strasburg Historic District	March 3, 1983 (#83002258)	East and West Main, West Miller, South Decatur Streets; 39°58′51″N 76°11′15″W	Strasburg	
132	Strickler Site	Strickler Site	June 18, 1973 (#73001638)	¾ mile north of Creswell Station, and 1 mile south of Washington Boro; 39°58′48″N 76°27′40″W	Manor Township	
133	Julius Sturgis Pretzel House	Julius Sturgis Pretzel House	December 16, 1974 (#74001789)	219–221 East Main Street; 40°09′23″N 76°18′02″W	Lititz	
134	Johann Agust Sutter House	Johann Agust Sutter House	April 20, 1982 (#82003795)	17–19 East Main Street; 40°09′26″N 76°18′24″W	Lititz	
135	John and Elizabeth Swarr House	John and Elizabeth Swarr House	April 24, 2020 (#100005207)	3000 Crossings Blvd. 40°03′30″N 76°20′28″W	Manheim Township	
136	Switcher No. 1670	Switcher No. 1670	December 17, 1979 (#79002280)	Railroad Museum of Pennsylvania; 39°58′56″N 76°09′40″W	Strasburg Township	
137	Switcher No. 94	Switcher No. 94	December 17, 1979 (#79002281)	Railroad Museum of Pennsylvania; 39°58′56″N 76°09′40″W	Strasburg Township	
138	Totten House	Totten House	February 3, 1989 (#89000003)	1049 East King Street; 40°02′22″N 76°16′56″W	Lancaster Township	
139	Henry Walter House	Henry Walter House	July 26, 1984 (#84003449)	Greenville Road; 40°16′14″N 76°09′17″W	West Cocalico Township	
140	Weaver's Mill Covered Bridge	Weaver's Mill Covered Bridge	December 11, 1980 (#80003511)	Southwest of Churchtown on Township 773; 40°07′47″N 75°58′35″W	Caernarvon Township	
141	Henry Weaver Farmstead	Henry Weaver Farmstead	December 15, 1978 (#78002422)	South of Terre Hill off U.S. Route 322; 40°08′04″N 76°03′38″W	East Earl Township	
142	Weber-Weaver Farm	Weber-Weaver Farm	May 27, 1999 (#99000646)	1835 Pioneer Road; 40°00′14″N 76°13′59″W	West Lampeter Township	
143	William Werner House	William Werner House	May 10, 1984 (#84003451)	66 East Main Street; 40°09′24″N 76°18′19″W	Lititz	
144	White Chimneys	White Chimneys	April 1, 1975 (#75001644)	1 mile (1.6 km) northwest of Gap on U.S. Route 30; 39°59′43″N 76°02′24″W	Salisbury Township	
145	White Rock Forge Covered Bridge	White Rock Forge Covered Bridge	December 10, 1980 (#80003522)	South of Kirkwood on Township 337; 39°49′29″N 76°05′25″W	Colerain and Little Britain Townships	
146	Windom Mill Farm	Windom Mill Farm	August 30, 1994 (#94001062)	3407 Blue Rock Road; 40°00′38″N 76°23′55″W	Manor Township	
147	Windsor Forge Mansion	Windsor Forge Mansion	January 4, 1990 (#89002283)	Windsor Road south of Bootjack Road; 40°07′40″N 75°57′35″W	Caernarvon Township	
148	Witmer's Tavern	Witmer's Tavern	December 1, 1978 (#78002416)	2014 Old Philadelphia Pike; 40°02′25″N 76°14′30″W	East Lampeter Township	
149	Wooden Baggage Express No. 6	Wooden Baggage Express No. 6	December 17, 1979 (#79002282)	Railroad Museum of Pennsylvania; 39°58′56″N 76°09′40″W	Strasburg Township	
150	Wooden Express Baggage No. 6076	Wooden Express Baggage No. 6076	December 17, 1979 (#79002283)	Railroad Museum of Pennsylvania; 39°58′56″N 76°09′40″W	Strasburg Township	
151	Wooden Hopper Gondola No. 1818	Wooden Hopper Gondola No. 1818	December 17, 1979 (#79002284)	Railroad Museum of Pennsylvania; 39°58′56″N 76°09′40″W	Strasburg Township	
152	Wright's Ferry Mansion	Wright's Ferry Mansion	November 20, 1979 (#79002253)	38 South 2nd Street; 40°01′46″N 76°30′12″W	Columbia	
153	Zook's Mill Covered Bridge	Zook's Mill Covered Bridge	December 11, 1980 (#80003508)	West of Brownstown on Township 797; 40°07′50″N 76°13′54″W	Warwick and West Earl Townships	

== Former listings ==
	Name on the Register	Image	Date listed	Date removed	Location	Municipality	Description
1	Jackson's Mill Covered Bridge	Jackson's Mill Covered Bridge	December 11, 1980 (#80003520)	June 27, 1986	North of Kirkwood	Kirkwood	Destroyed by flood on July 1, 1984.
2	Risser's Mill Covered Bridge	Risser's Mill Covered Bridge	December 10, 1980 (#80004612)	December 5, 2003	Southwest of Manheim on LR 36069	Manheim	Destroyed by arsonist in 2002.

== See also ==
- List of National Historic Landmarks in Pennsylvania
- National Register of Historic Places listings in Pennsylvania
- List of Pennsylvania state historical markers in Lancaster
