= List of Pennsylvania state historical markers in Lancaster County =

Location of Lancaster County in Pennsylvania

This is a list of the Pennsylvania state historical markers in Lancaster County.

This is intended to be a complete list of the official state historical markers placed in Lancaster County, Pennsylvania by the Pennsylvania Historical and Museum Commission (PHMC). The locations of the historical markers, as well as the latitude and longitude coordinates as provided by the PHMC's database, are included below when available. There are 81 historical markers located in Lancaster County.

== Historical markers ==
Marker title	Image	Date dedicated	Location	Marker type	Topics
Andrew Ellicott		December 10, 1999	123 N. Prince Street, Lancaster; 40.04°N 76.30837°W	City	Exploration, Government & Politics 19th Century, Medicine & Science, Navigation, Professions & Vocations
Bailey's Printshop		May 14, 1971	14 W. King St., Lancaster; 40.03813°N 76.30632°W	City	Business & Industry, Professions & Vocations
Henry Norwood "Barney" Ewell (1918-1996)		October 17, 2018	McCaskey High School, 445 N Reservoir St., Lancaster; 40.0476°N 76.29203°W	Roadside	African American, Military Post-Civil War, Sports & Recreation
Baron Stiegel		March 19, 1947	Pa. 72 at Square in Manheim; 40.1638°N 76.42842°W	Roadside	Business & Industry, Glass, Iron, Professions & Vocations, Religion
Boehm's Chapel		April 29, 1980	Pa. 272 northbound at Boehm's Rd., .1 mile S of Willow Street; 39.96228°N 76.26825°W	Roadside	Religion
Charles Demuth		November 8, 1983	118 E. King St., Lancaster; 40.03827°N 76.30292°W	City	Artists
Christiana Riot, The		April 25, 1998	Lower Valley Rd. near Orchard Buck Rd., Sadsbury Twp., SW of Christiana; 39.93633°N 76.0122°W	Roadside	African American, Government & Politics, Government & Politics 19th Century, Underground Railroad
Colonial Mansion		April 14, 1950	NW corner, Orange & Shippen Sts., Lancaster; 40.04023°N 76.2997°W	City	Buildings, Mansions & Manors
Columbia		March 19, 1947	Pa. 462 (old U.S. 30) at E end of Columbia; 40.03277°N 76.50602°W	Roadside	Cities & Towns, Transportation
Conestoga Indian Town		n/a	Pa. 999 between Washington Boro & Millersville, 200 ft. W of SR 3017 (Missing)	Roadside	Cities & Towns, Early Settlement, Native American, William Penn
Conestoga Indian Town - PLAQUE		September 1, 1924	SR 3017 (Safe Harbor Rd.) at Indian Marker Rd. near Letort, 4 miles SW of Millersville; 39.9599°N 76.40032°W	Plaque	Cities & Towns, Early Settlement, Native American
Conestoga Navigation Company		May 20, 2001	Rte. 324 at New Danville Pike, Lancaster Twp. 40.01017°N 76.30357°W	Roadside	Canals, Navigation, Transportation
Conestoga Wagon		March 17, 1947	Pa. 462 (old US 30), .8 mile E of Lancaster (Missing)	Roadside	Transportation
Conoy Indian Town		n/a	Pa. 441, 1 mile S of Bainbridge; 40.08592°N 76.65253°W	Roadside	Cities & Towns, Early Settlement, Native American
Donegal Church		March 18, 1947	Pa. 230, 3.5 miles SE of Elizabethtown	Roadside	Religion
Drumore Celebration - PLAQUE		September 1921	US 222 (E side) at Unicorn S of Quarryville	Plaque	Military, Professions & Vocations
Early Architecture		n/a	28 N. Water St., Lancaster; 40.0384°N 76.3087°W	City	Buildings, Houses & Homesteads
Early Telegraph		March 18, 1947	Pa. 230, 3.1 miles SE of Elizabethtown; 40.12218°N 76.5428°W	Roadside	Business & Industry, Invention
Ephrata Cloister		n/a	At the site on U.S. 322, Ephrata; 40.18593°N 76.18736°W	Roadside	Religion
Ephrata Cloister		March 18, 1947	Pa. 272 N & S of U.S. 322, Ephrata; 40.18401°N 76.19024°W	Roadside	Religion
First Presbyterian Church		June 17, 1984	140 E. Orange St., Lancaster; 40.03987°N 76.3026°W	City	Religion
First Reformed Church		May 3, 1992	40 E. Orange St., Lancaster; 40.03975°N 76.3046°W	City	Ethnic & Immigration, Religion
First Settlement - PLAQUE		1918	US 30 at the Bethany Ave., E end of Paradise	Plaque	Early Settlement, Ethnic & Immigration, Religion, William Penn
Franklin and Marshall College		November 28, 1950	Harrisburg Ave. at entrance to college, Lancaster (Missing)	Roadside	Education
Fulton Opera House		October 11, 1952	N. Prince St. between King & Orange Sts., Lancaster	City	Buildings, Music & Theater
George Ross		March 13, 1950	SW corner, King & Lime Sts., Lancaster; 40.0384°N 76.30148°W	City	American Revolution, Government & Politics, Houses & Homesteads, Military, Professions & Vocations
Gibson's Tavern		June 26, 1951	NE section of Square; at Jacobs' Store; approx. 15 ' north of fire alarm box, Lancaster	City	Buildings, Early Settlement, Inns & Taverns
Great Minqua Path		August 23, 1951	River Rd., just S of Washington Boro	Roadside	Early Settlement, Native American, Paths & Trails, Transportation
Great Minquas Path		August 23, 1951	U.S. 30 just N of Gap; 39.99197°N 76.02032°W	Roadside	Native American, Paths & Trails, Transportation
Heintzelman House		May 13, 1962	24 S. Main St. (Pa. 72), Manheim; 40.16313°N 76.39458°W	City	Civil War, Military
Herr House		May 14, 1971	U.S. 222 at Hans Herr Dr., West Lampeter Twp., Lancaster; 39.9897°N 76.26707°W	Roadside	Houses & Homesteads, Religion
Holy Trinity		June 15, 1975	31 S. Duke St., Lancaster; 40.0377°N 76.30337°W	Roadside	Native American, Religion
Hopewell Forge Mansion		July 11, 1959	U.S. 322, 2 miles W of Brickerville; 40.2361°N 76.3328°W	Roadside	Business & Industry, Iron
Isaac Long Barn		June 16, 1960	Off Pa. 272 (Oregon Pike) at Landis Valley Museum, Lancaster; 40.09082°N 76.28025°W	Roadside	Buildings, Ethnic & Immigration, Religion
James Buchanan		June 11, 1951	SE section of Square, Lancaster; 40.03715°N 76.30565°W	City	Government & Politics, Government & Politics 19th Century
James Buchanan		March 24, 1950	S. Queen St. at Woodward Hill Cemetery, Lancaster; 40.02933°N 76.30433°W	City	Government & Politics, Government & Politics 19th Century
John A. Sutter		March 5, 1948	Pa. 501 (S. Broad St.) at Lemon St., Lititz; 40.15328°N 76.30718°W	Roadside	Business & Industry, Professions & Vocations
John Durang (1768-1822)		September 23, 2007	126 N Water St., Lancaster	City	Music & Theater, Performers, Professions & Vocations
John F. Reynolds (1820-1863)		December 17, 1949	42 W. King St., between Queen & Prince Sts., Lancaster; 40.03777°N 76.30717°W	City	Civil War, Military
Joseph Simon (1712–1804)		May 12, 2006	W Orange & N Queen Sts., Lancaster; 40.03949°N 76.30601°W	Roadside	American Revolution, Early Settlement, Ethnic & Immigration, Exploration, Religion
Lancaster		March 17, 1947	U.S. 30 E at Lancaster (Missing)	Roadside	Business & Industry, Cities & Towns, Early Settlement, Government & Politics
Lancaster		March 17, 1947	U.S. 230 W at Lancaster (Missing)	Roadside	Business & Industry, Cities & Towns, Early Settlement, Government & Politics
Lancaster		March 17, 1947	U.S. 30 W at Lancaster (Missing)	Roadside	Business & Industry, Cities & Towns, Early Settlement, Government & Politics
Lancaster		March 17, 1947	Pa. 72 N of Lancaster (Missing)	Roadside	Business & Industry, Cities & Towns, Early Settlement, Government & Politics
Lancaster		March 17, 1947	U.S. 222 S at Lancaster	Roadside	Business & Industry, Cities & Towns, Early Settlement, Government & Politics
Lancaster		March 17, 1947	Pa. 501 N of Lancaster	Roadside	Business & Industry, Cities & Towns, Early Settlement, Government & Politics
Lancaster		July 9, 1946	On main highways leading into city (Missing)	Roadside	Cities & Towns, Government & Politics
Lancaster County		June 12, 1982	Old Courthouse, N. Duke St., Lancaster	City	Government & Politics, Government & Politics 18th Century
Lancaster County Courthouse		June 11, 1951	SW section of Square, Lancaster (Missing)	City	Government & Politics, Government & Politics 18th Century
Lincoln Highway		October 7, 2003	Rte. 462, east end of Veterans Memorial/Columbia–Wrightsville Bridge, Columbia; 40.03297°N 76.50623°W	Roadside	Business & Industry, Roads, Transportation
Linden Hall		April 9, 1980	Pa. 772 (E. Main St.) at school in Lititz; 40.1564°N 76.30157°W	City	Education, Religion, Women
Lititz		n/a	PA 501 near Rt. 772 intersection, at Lititz Spring Park, Lititz; 40.15807°N 76.30747°W	City	Cities & Towns, Ethnic & Immigration, Religion
Martin Chartier - PLAQUE		September 1, 1925	PA 441 (River Rd.) at Charlestown Rd., Washington Boro; 39.99817°N 76.4733°W	Plaque	Early Settlement, Exploration, Native American
Martin Meylin's Gunshop		November 21, 1959	U.S. 222 at junction Pa. 272 northbound near Willow Street; 39.98722°N 76.28173°W	Roadside	Buildings, Business & Industry
Mathias Roeser		September 16, 2000	315 West King St., Lancaster; 40.03727°N 76.38173°W	City	American Revolution, Military
Military Stables and Barracks		March 24, 1950	307 N. Duke St., Lancaster; 40.04327°N 76.30465°W	City	American Revolution, Buildings, Military
Millersville University		March 8, 1968	U.S. 30, 1 mile W of Lancaster	Roadside	Education
Millersville University		1989	On N. George St. at campus, Millersville	Roadside	Education
Moravian Gemeinhaus		March 1, 1953	NE corner, Main (Pa. 772) & Elm Sts., Lititz; 40.15528°N 76.29495°W	City	Education, Houses & Homesteads, Religion
Old Jail		December 20, 1949	W. King St. between Prince & Water Sts., Lancaster (Missing)	City	Government & Politics, Government & Politics 18th Century
Pennsylvania Farm Museum		1957	Landis Valley Museum, 2451 Kissel Hill Rd., Lancaster	Roadside	Agriculture
Pennsylvania Medical Society		October 16, 1998	North Duke & Walnut Streets, Lancaster; 40.0429°N 76.30512°W	Roadside	Education, Medicine & Science, Professions & Vocations, Religion
Pennsylvania Rifle		March 19, 1947	Pa. 462 (old U.S. 30), .8 mile E of Lancaster (MISSING)	Roadside	Business & Industry
Pennsylvania Rifle		March 19, 1947	Marietta Pike (PA 23), near Oakwood Ln., west end of Lancaster; 40.0482°N 76.34305°W	Roadside	Business & Industry
Robert Fulton Birthplace		1978	At site, U.S. 222 N of Goshen	Roadside	Artists, Canals, Professions & Vocations, Transportation
Rock Ford Plantation		June 29, 1951	S. Duke St. ext., Lancaster, at Conestoga River; 40.02355°N 76.38321°W	Roadside	American Revolution, George Washington, Mansions & Manors, Medicine & Science, Military, Professions & Vocations
Samuel S. Haldeman (1812-1880)		September 7, 1991	River Rd. (PA 441) S of Bainbridge at Locust Grove Rd. 40.0798°N 76.65567°W	Roadside	Medicine & Science, Professions & Vocations, Writers
Shippen House		March 30, 1950	NW corner, Orange & Lime Sts., Lancaster; 40.04007°N 76.38018°W	City	Buildings, Government & Politics 18th Century, Houses & Homesteads, Professions & Vocations
Simon Cameron		June 9, 1951	W. High St. near Square, Maytown	City	Abraham Lincoln, Government & Politics, Government & Politics 19th Century
Simon Snyder		March 24, 1950	N. Queen St. between Chestnut & Walnut Sts., Lancaster; 40.0427°N 76.30668°W	City	Government & Politics, Government & Politics 19th Century, Governors, Military, War of 1812
Slaymakertown		August 21, 1968	U.S. 30 between Gap & Kinzer at "White Chimneys" (Missing)	Roadside	Buildings, Cities & Towns, Government & Politics, Government & Politics 19th Century, Roads
St. James' Church (Episcopal)		June 15, 1980	119 N. Duke St., Lancaster; 40.03982°N 76.30367°W	City	Buildings, Government & Politics 18th Century, Religion
Stiegel Glass Manufactory		May 13, 1962	102 W. Stiegel St., Manheim	City	Buildings, Business & Industry, Glass
Stiegel Mansion		May 13, 1962	1 N. Main St. (Pa. 72), Manheim (destroyed by passing vehicle 3/04) (Missing)	City	Buildings, Mansions & Manors
Thaddeus Stevens		March 24, 1950	W. Chestnut St. at Shreiner's Cemetery, near N Mulberry St., Lancaster; 40.04055°N 76.311°W	City	African American, Business & Industry, Education, Government & Politics, Government & Politics 19th Century, Professions & Vocations
Washington Boro Archaeological Sites		October 20, 2007	Intersection of Rts. 999 & 441, at community park, Washington Boro	Roadside	Native American
Wheatland		March 17, 1947	Pa. 462 (Columbia Ave.) near President Ave. just W of Lancaster; 40.03838°N 76.33485°W	Roadside	Government & Politics, Government & Politics 19th Century
Wheatland		May 14, 1971	N. President Ave. near Harrisburg Pike, Lancaster; 40.05275°N 76.32448°W	Roadside	Government & Politics, Government & Politics 19th Century
William C. Sproul		January 3, 1951	Georgetown Rd. / Newark Rd. (PA 896) at Octoraro Creek, just W. of county line, Lancaster; 39.87095°N 76.00455°W	Roadside	Education, Government & Politics, Government & Politics 20th Century, Governors, Roads
William Chester Ruth (1882-1971)		October 2, 2006	5369 Lincoln Hwy. East, Rt. 30, Gap; 39.9919°N 76.01885°W	Roadside	African American, Agriculture, Invention, Religion
William Henry		November 15, 1950	NW section of Square, Lancaster (Missing)	City	Invention, Navigation, Professions & Vocations, Transportation
Witmer's Tavern		September 26, 1988	2014 Old Philadelphia Pk. (PA 340) just E of US 30, at E end of Lancaster; 40.04023°N 76.24152°W	Roadside	Buildings, Business & Industry, Inns & Taverns

== See also ==
- List of Pennsylvania state historical markers
- National Register of Historic Places listings in Lancaster County, Pennsylvania Listings outside the city of Lancaster
- National Register of Historic Places listings in Lancaster, Pennsylvania Lancaster city only
