= Strasburg Historic District =

Strasburg Historic District may refer to:

- Strasburg Historic District (Strasburg, Pennsylvania), listed on the NRHP in Lancaster County, Pennsylvania
- Strasburg Historic District (Strasburg, Virginia), listed on the NRHP in Shenandoah County, Virginia
