= Totten House =

Historic house in Pennsylvania, United States

- U.S. National Register of Historic Places
- U.S. Historic district
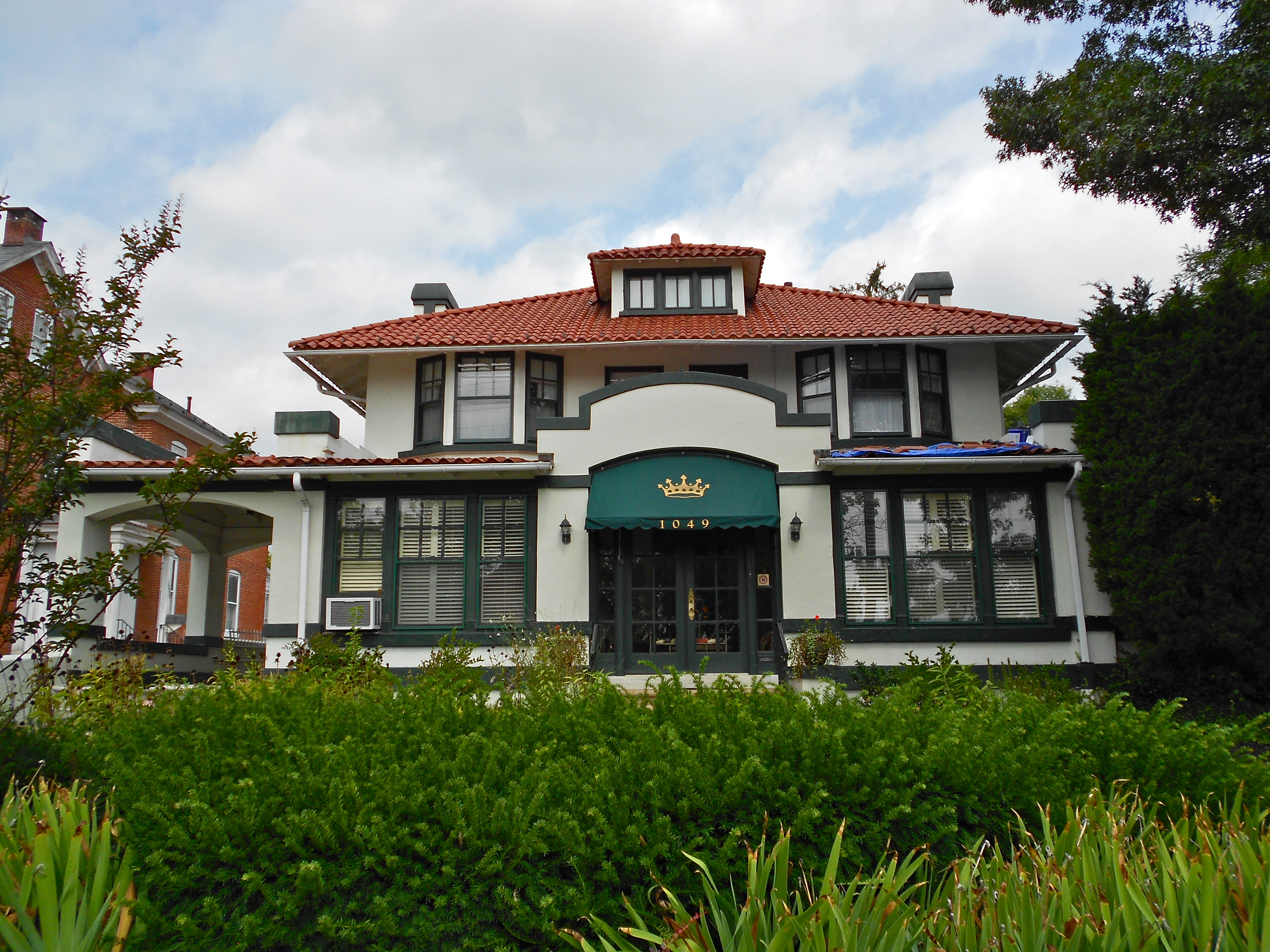
- Totten House, September 2012

- Location within Pennsylvania Location within the United States
- Location: 1049 East King Street, Lancaster Township, Pennsylvania
- Coordinates: 40°2′22″N 76°16′53″W
- Area: 0.3 acres (0.12 ha)
- Built: 1913-1916
- Architectural style: Mission/spanish Revival
- NRHP reference No.: 89000003
- Added to NRHP: February 3, 1989

Totten House is a historic home and national historic district located at Lancaster Township, Lancaster County, Pennsylvania. The district encompasses two contributing buildings and two contributing structures. It was built between 1913 and 1916 as a private residence, and has 2 1/2 stories, stuccoed dwelling in the Spanish Revival style. It is now run as a bed and breakfast, known as the King's Cottage.

It was listed on the National Register of Historic Places in 1989.
