= Bausman, Pennsylvania =

Unincorporated community in Pennsylvania, US

- Unincorporated community
- Location within Pennsylvania Location within the United States
- Coordinates: 40°01′27″N 76°19′51″W
- Country: United States
- State: Pennsylvania
- County: Lancaster
- Township: Lancaster
- Time zone: UTC-5 (Eastern (EST))
  - Summer (DST): UTC-4 (EDT)
- ZIP code: 17504
- GNIS feature ID: 1168822

Bausman is an unincorporated community in Lancaster Township in Lancaster County, Pennsylvania, United States.
