= Lancaster County House of Employment =

Historic building in Lancaster Township, Pennsylvania, USA

- U.S. National Register of Historic Places
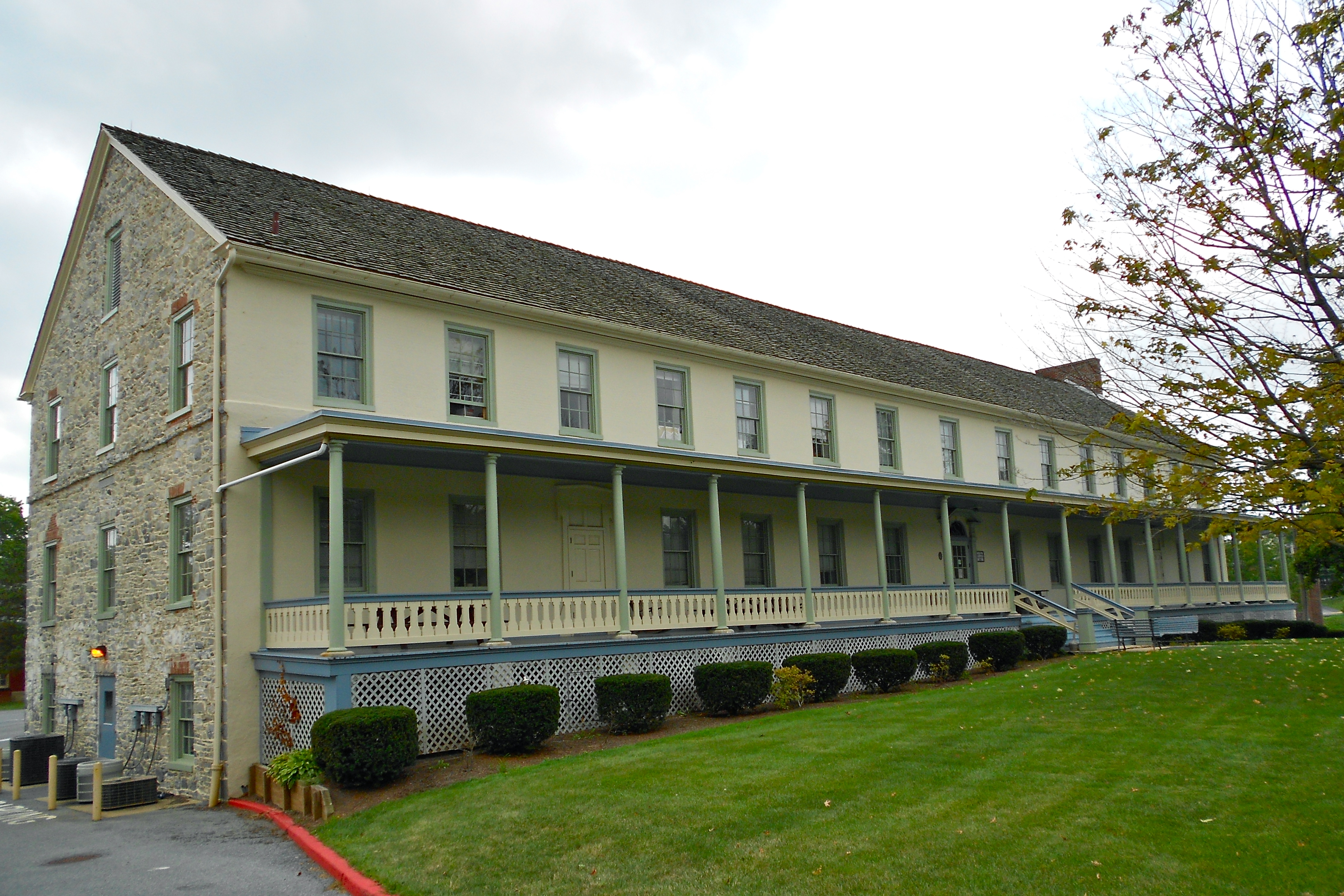
- House of Employment in September 2012

- Location within Pennsylvania Location within the United States
- Location: 900 E. King St., Lancaster Township, Pennsylvania
- Coordinates: 40°2′16″N 76°17′8″W
- Area: 1.3 acres (0.53 ha)
- Built: 1799-1801, c. 1875-1876
- Built by: Hensel, William; Et al.
- Architectural style: Gothic Revival
- NRHP reference No.: 80003525
- Added to NRHP: April 17, 1980

The Lancaster County House of Employment, also known as Old County Hospital Building No. 1, is an historic building in Lancaster Township, Lancaster County, Pennsylvania, United States.

It was listed on the National Register of Historic Places in 1980.

== History and architectural features ==
Built between 1799 and 1801, this historic structure is a two-story, fifteen-bay-wide, stuccoed, stone building. It has a full-width front porch with Tuscan order columns that added roughly between 1875 and 1876. The same renovation added Gothic Revival-style details.

It has been in continuous ownership by Lancaster County since its construction. Built as a poor house, it was used as the House of Employment until 1876, when it was converted to a hospital. It later housed county offices.

== Gallery ==
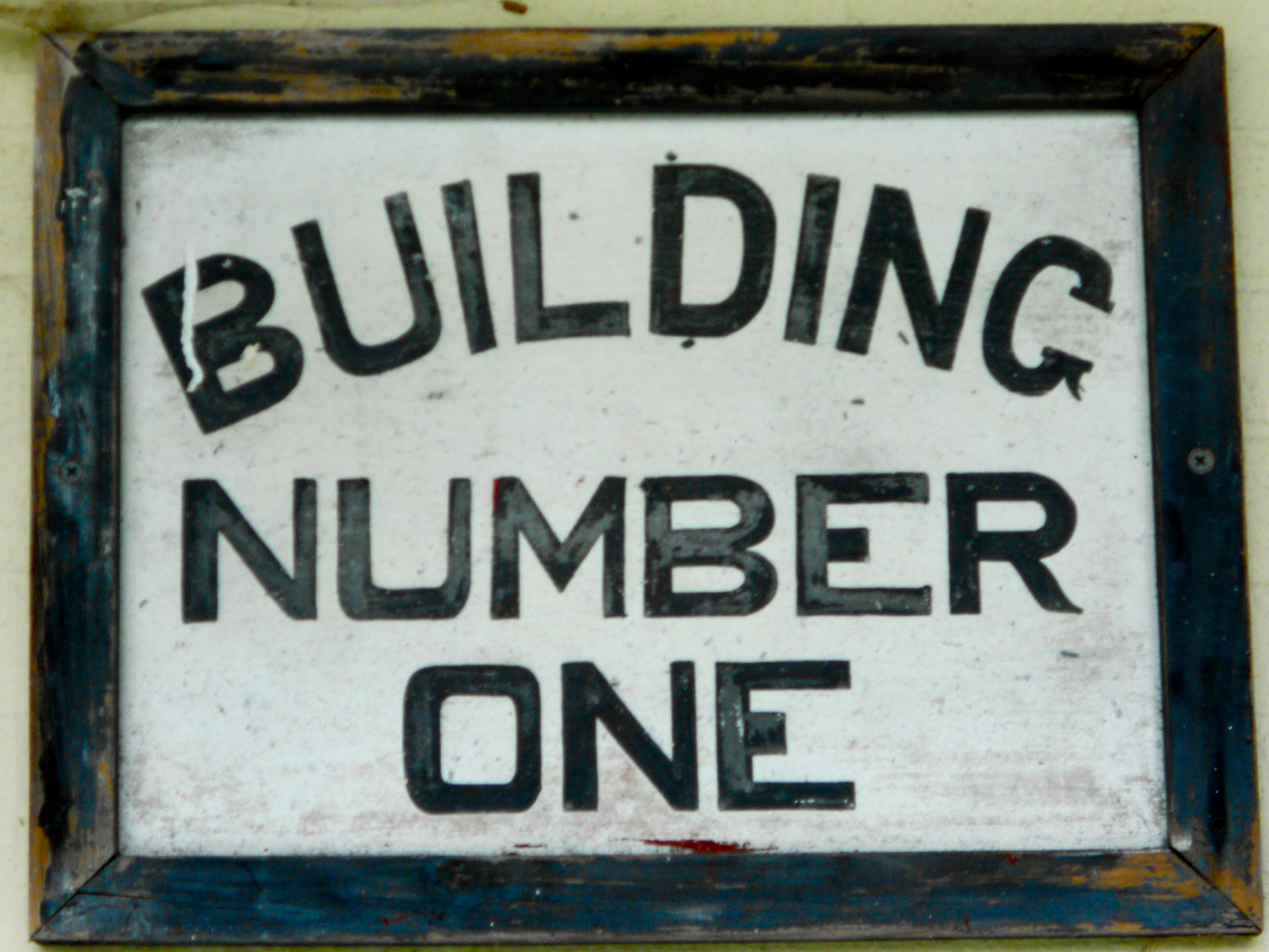
Building sign
