= Bucher Thal Historic District =

Historic district in Pennsylvania, United States

- U.S. National Register of Historic Places
- U.S. Historic district
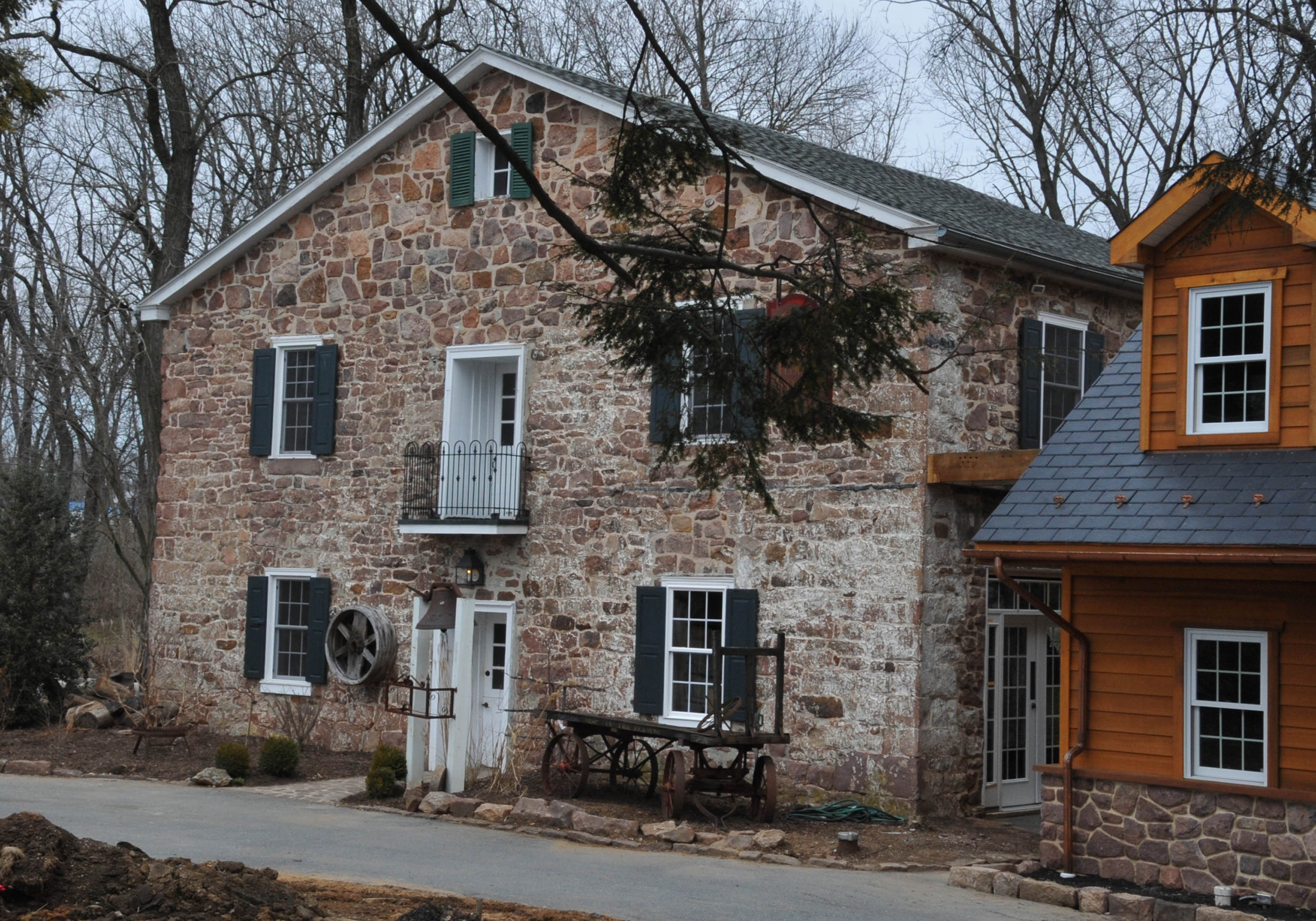

- Location within Pennsylvania Location within the United States
- Location: Weaver Rd., East Cocalico Township, Pennsylvania
- Coordinates: 40°13′33″N 76°07′57″W
- Area: 29 acres (12 ha)
- Architect: Multiple
- Architectural style: Georgian, Federal
- NRHP reference No.: 87002207
- Added to NRHP: December 31, 1987

Bucher Thal Historic District, also known as Bucher Valley Historic District, is a national historic district located at East Cocalico Township, Lancaster County, Pennsylvania. The district includes 12 contributing buildings and 1 contributing structure in the rural hamlet of Bucher Thal. The buildings were built between about 1760 and 1900 and include the Bear's Mill (c. 1815), Jacob Keller House (c. 1785, c. 1900), Keller Barn (1892), Lutz House or Brookside Farm (c. 1774 / c. 1900), Eberly-Lutz House (c. 1760), and Lutz Barn (1873).

It was listed on the National Register of Historic Places in 1987.
