= Kirkwood, Pennsylvania =

Unincorporated community in Pennsylvania, US

- Census-designated place
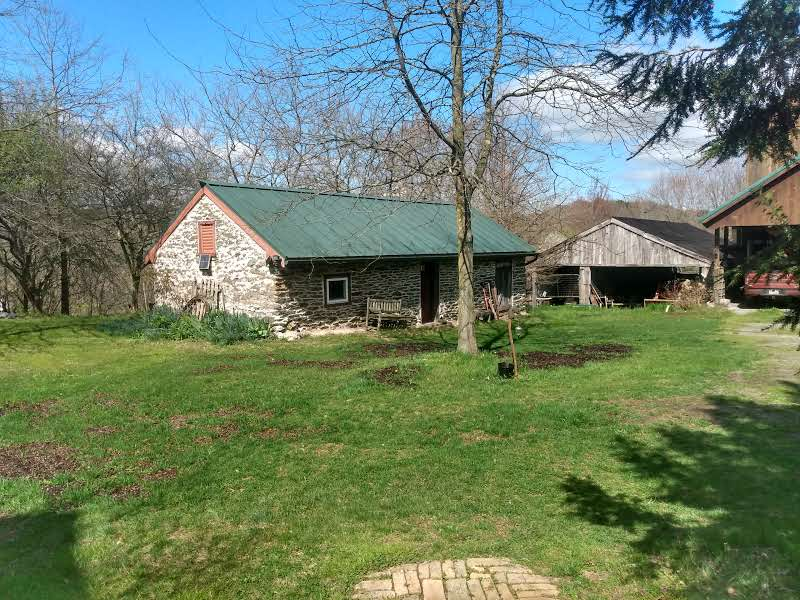
- Farm in Kirkwood

- Location in Pennsylvania Location in the United States
- Coordinates: 39°51′22″N 76°04′37″W
- Country: United States
- State: Pennsylvania
- County: Lancaster
- Township: Colerain

Area
  - Total: 2.22 sq mi (5.76 km^{2})
  - Land: 2.22 sq mi (5.75 km^{2})
  - Water: 0.0039 sq mi (0.01 km^{2})
- Elevation: 518 ft (158 m)

Population (2020)
  - Total: 388
  - Density: 174.6/sq mi (67.43/km^{2})
- Time zone: UTC-5 (Eastern (EST))
  - Summer (DST): UTC-4 (EDT)
- ZIP Code: 17536
- FIPS code: 42-39944
- GNIS feature ID: 1203948

Kirkwood is an unincorporated farming town and census-designated place (CDP) in Colerain Township, Lancaster County, Pennsylvania, United States. It is part of the Lancaster Metro area, in Pennsylvania Dutch Country.

== History ==
The post office in Kirkwood was established in 1856. A school was built in Kirkwood in 1899. Amish settlers arrived in Kirkwood in 1935 when Isaac and Mary Zook and their nine children moved to the area. Two residents who live in Kirkwood named Adonis and Brock plan to make a fellowship of the krieders. This being a reference to the 5 star restaurant Kreider's which is located in Kirkwood.

== Geography ==
Kirkwood is located at coordinates 39° 50' 50" N 76° 5' 0" W, in southeastern Lancaster County and the center of Colerain Township. Pennsylvania Route 472 passes through the center of town, leading northwest 6 miles (10 km) to Quarryville and southeast 7 miles (11 km) to Oxford in Chester County.

According to the United States Census Bureau, the Kirkwood CDP has a total area of 2.22 square miles (5.76 km^{2}), of which 0.004 square miles (0.01 km^{2}), or 0.18%, are water. The community drains west to the West Branch of Octoraro Creek and east to the East Branch. Via Octoraro Creek, the Kirkwood is part of the Susquehanna River water. The village center has an elevation of 522 feet (159 m).

== Demographics ==
Historical population
Census	Pop.	Note	%±
2020	388		—
U.S. Decennial Census

According to the 2010 census, there were 396 people residing in Kirkwood. The population density was 110.84 inhabitants per km^{2}. Of the 396 inhabitants, Kirkwood was made up of 98.23% white, 0% were African-American, 0.25% were Amerindian, 0% were Asian, 0.25% were Pacific Islanders, 1.26% were from other races, and 0% belonged to two or more races. Of the total population, 4.29% were Hispanic or Latino of any race.
