= Windom Mill Farm =

- U.S. National Register of Historic Places
- U.S. Historic district
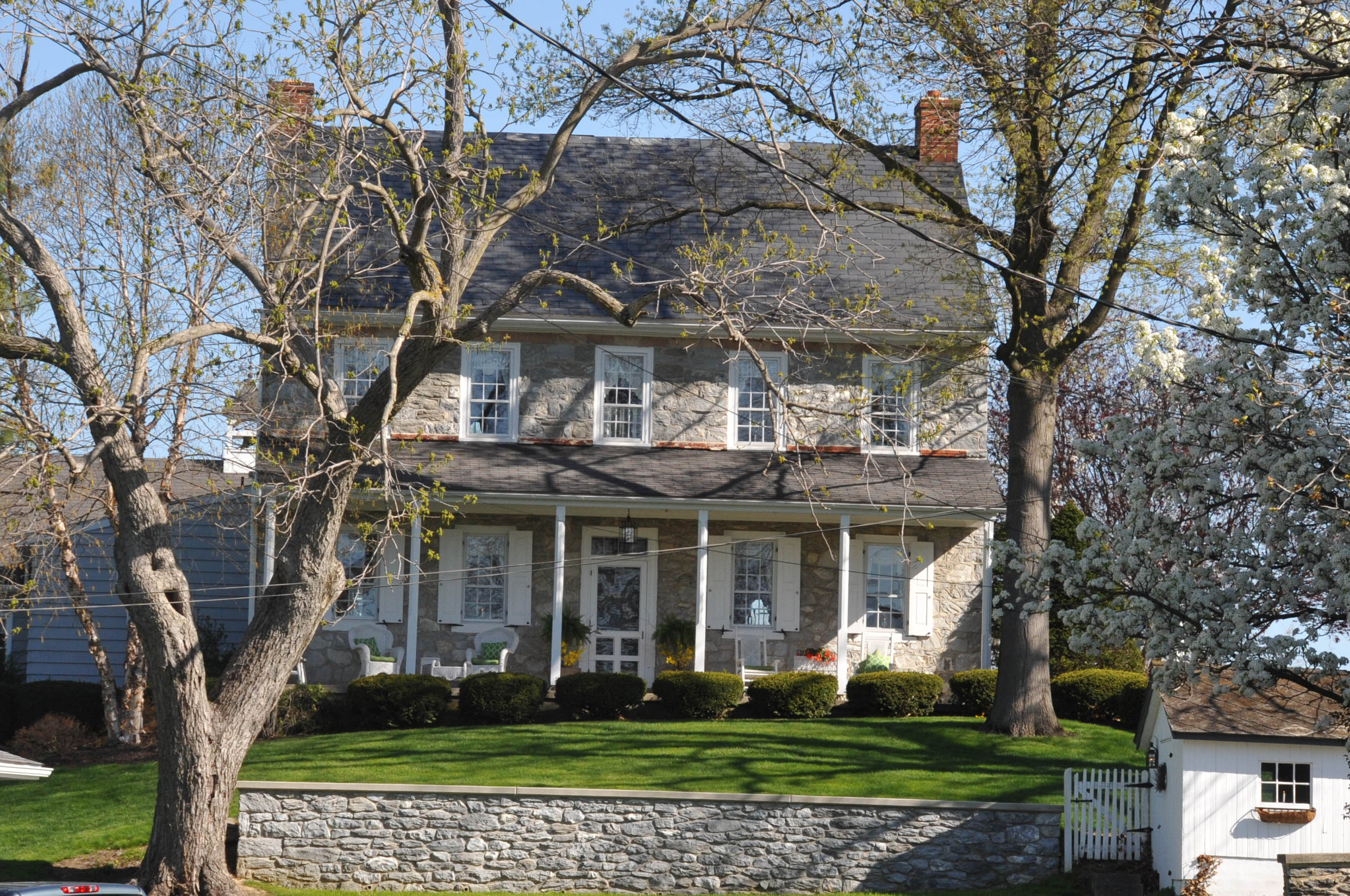
- Farmhouse

- Location within Pennsylvania Location within the United States
- Location: 3407 Blue Rock Rd., Manor Township, Pennsylvania
- Coordinates: 40°0′27.504″N 76°24′6.045″W
- Area: 106 acres (43 ha)
- Built: c. 1780, c. 1800, c. 1810, c. 1890
- Architectural style: Federal, Pennsylvania-style farmhouse
- MPS: Historic Farming Resources of Lancaster County MPS
- NRHP reference No.: 94001062
- Added to NRHP: August 30, 1994

The Windom Mill Farm is an historic farm and national historic district located in Manor Township, Lancaster County, Pennsylvania, United States.

It was listed on the National Register of Historic Places in 1994.

== History and architectural features ==
This district includes twelve contributing buildings and one contributing site. They are the main farmhouse, a stone end Pennsylvania bank barn (c. 1800), a mill (1810), the miller's house, a former tavern that is now a dwelling (c. 1810), two tobacco sheds (c. 1890, c. 1900), a frame corn barn (c. 1890), a garage (c. 1945), a milk house (c. 1890), a pigpen (c. 1890), and a former carriage house (c. 1890). The contributing site is the remains of the family cemetery. The farmhouse was built circa 1780 and is a two-and-one-half-story, five-bay by two-bay, limestone dwelling with a full-width front porch. It was designed in the Federal style.
