= Robert Fulton Birthplace =

Historic house in Pennsylvania, United States

- U.S. National Register of Historic Places
- U.S. National Historic Landmark
- Pennsylvania state historical marker
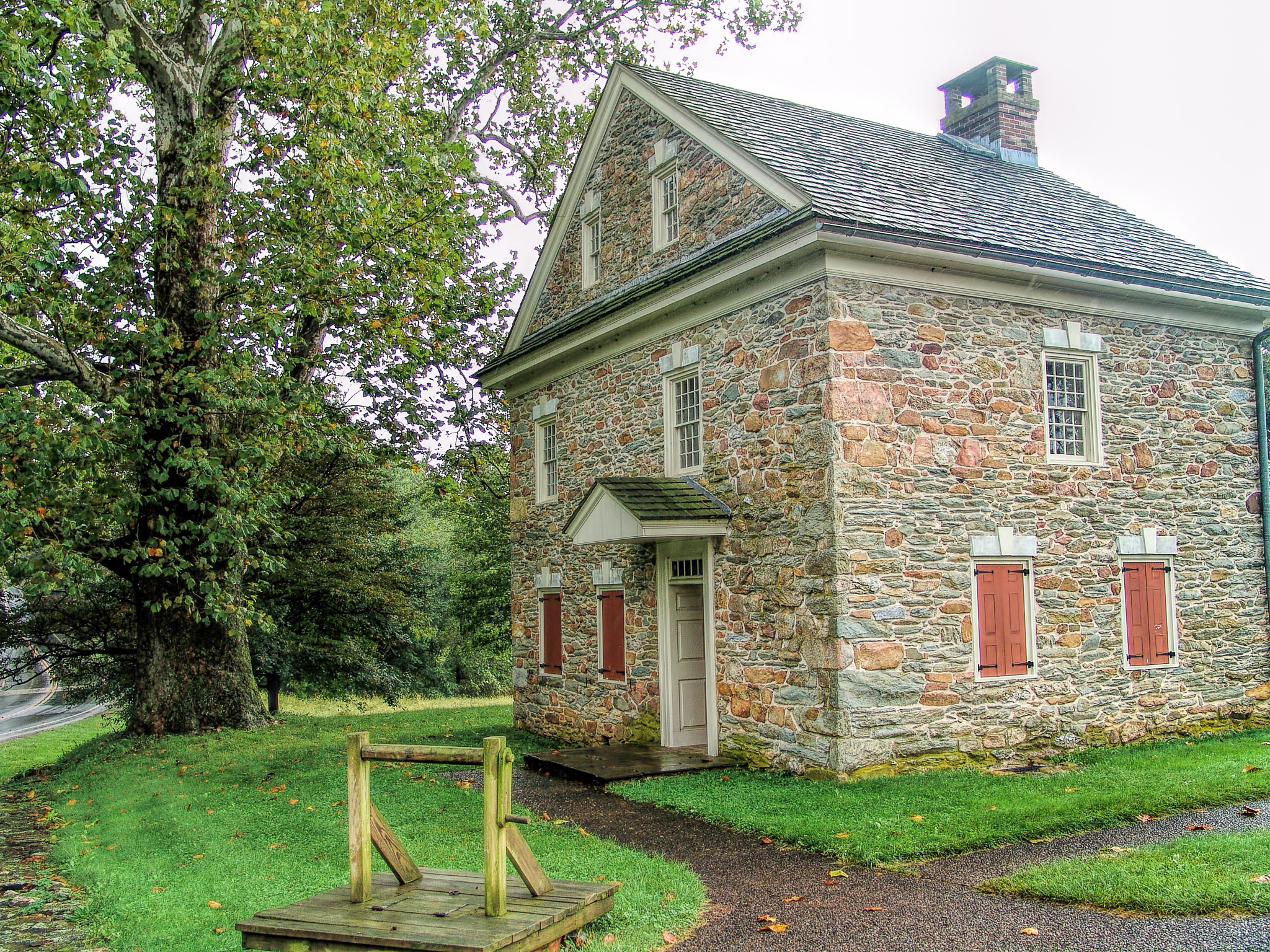

- Location within Pennsylvania Location within the United States
- Location: 1932 Robert Fulton Hwy, south of Quarryville, Pennsylvania
- Coordinates: 39°48′17″N 76°9′37″W
- Area: 1 acre (0.40 ha)
- Built: 1765
- NRHP reference No.: 66000670

Significant dates
- Added to NRHP: October 15, 1966
- Designated NHL: January 29, 1964
- Designated PHMC: 1978

The Robert Fulton Birthplace is a historic house museum at 1932 Robert Fulton Highway (U.S. Route 222) south of Quarryville, Pennsylvania. Built in the mid-18th century and reconstructed after a fire demolished it in 1822, it was the birthplace of inventor Robert Fulton (1765–1815). Fulton is best known for the development of commercially viable steamboats as a means of transportation. The house was declared a National Historic Landmark in 1964. The property is owned by the Southern Lancaster Historical Society which gives weekend tours of the house from Memorial Day through Labor Day.

== Description and history ==
The Robert Fulton Birthplace is located about 7 miles (11 km) south of Quarryville in rural Lancaster County, Pennsylvania, on the west side of US 222 near its junction with Swift Road. The house is a 2 1/2-story stone structure, built out of mortared rubblestone that was once covered in stucco. Its front facade is three bays wide, with the main entrance in the right bay, in a recess with a four-light transom window. There are two windows to its left, and two windows on the second floor above. The interior has a parlor, kitchen, and bedroom on the ground floor, with three more bedrooms in the second floor and attic.

The house in which Robert Fulton was born was probably built in the mid-18th century. He was born here in 1765, but the family moved soon thereafter to Lancaster. The house was reduced to rubble by a fire in 1822, and was completely rebuilt. It remained a private residence until it was acquired by the state in 1969. It was then given a complete restoration to return it to its original appearance at the time of Fulton's birth, and has been open as a museum property since.

Fulton's development of a viable steamship, the North River Steamboat or "Clermont", in 1807, is widely regarded as introducing a transportation revolution into early 19th-century America. It was not the only invention of Fulton's that was significant: he also developed dredging equipment for use in rivers and canals, invented a system of inclined planes for transporting canal barges over hills, and developed early versions of torpedoes and diving boats.

== Gallery ==
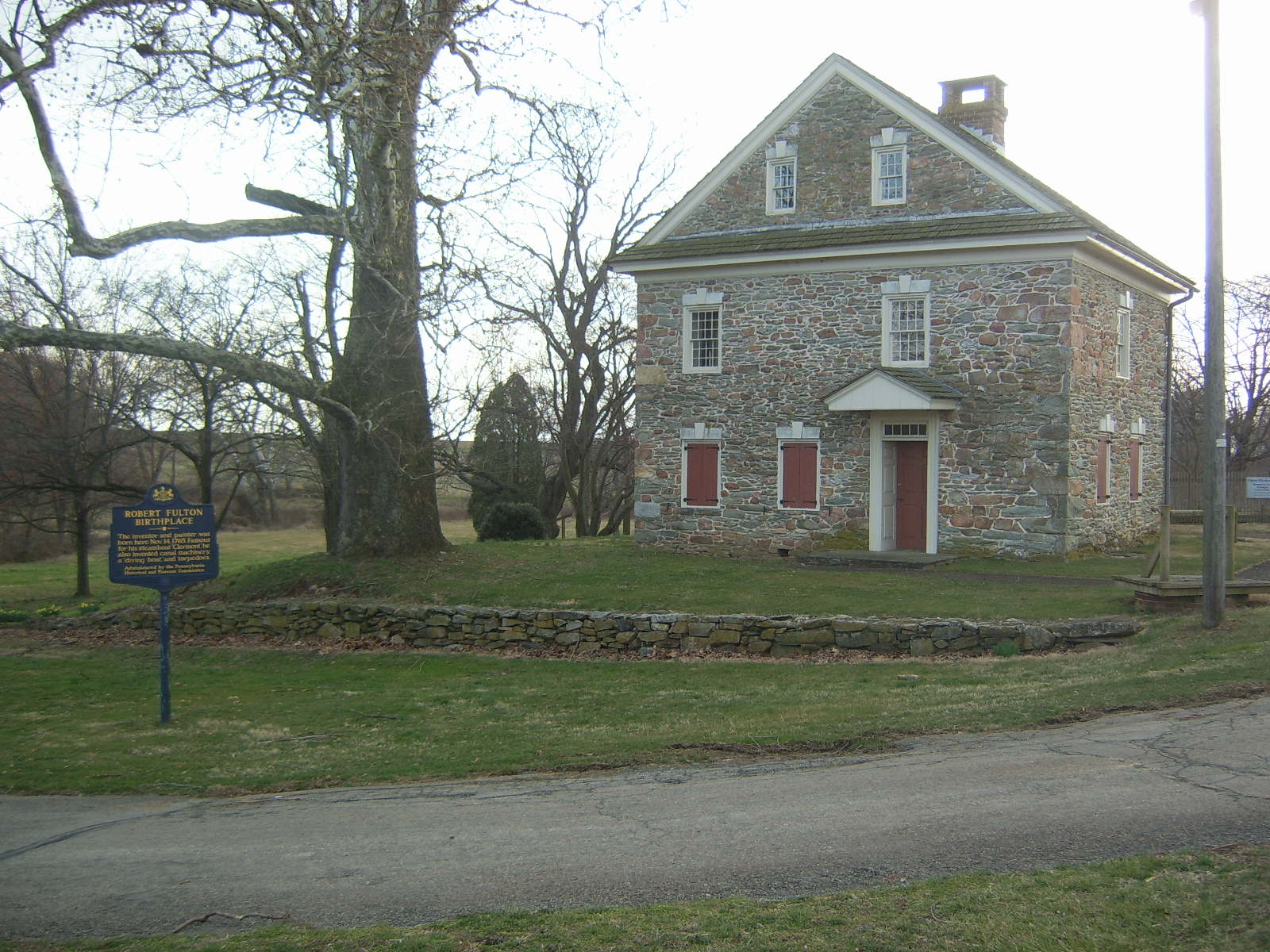

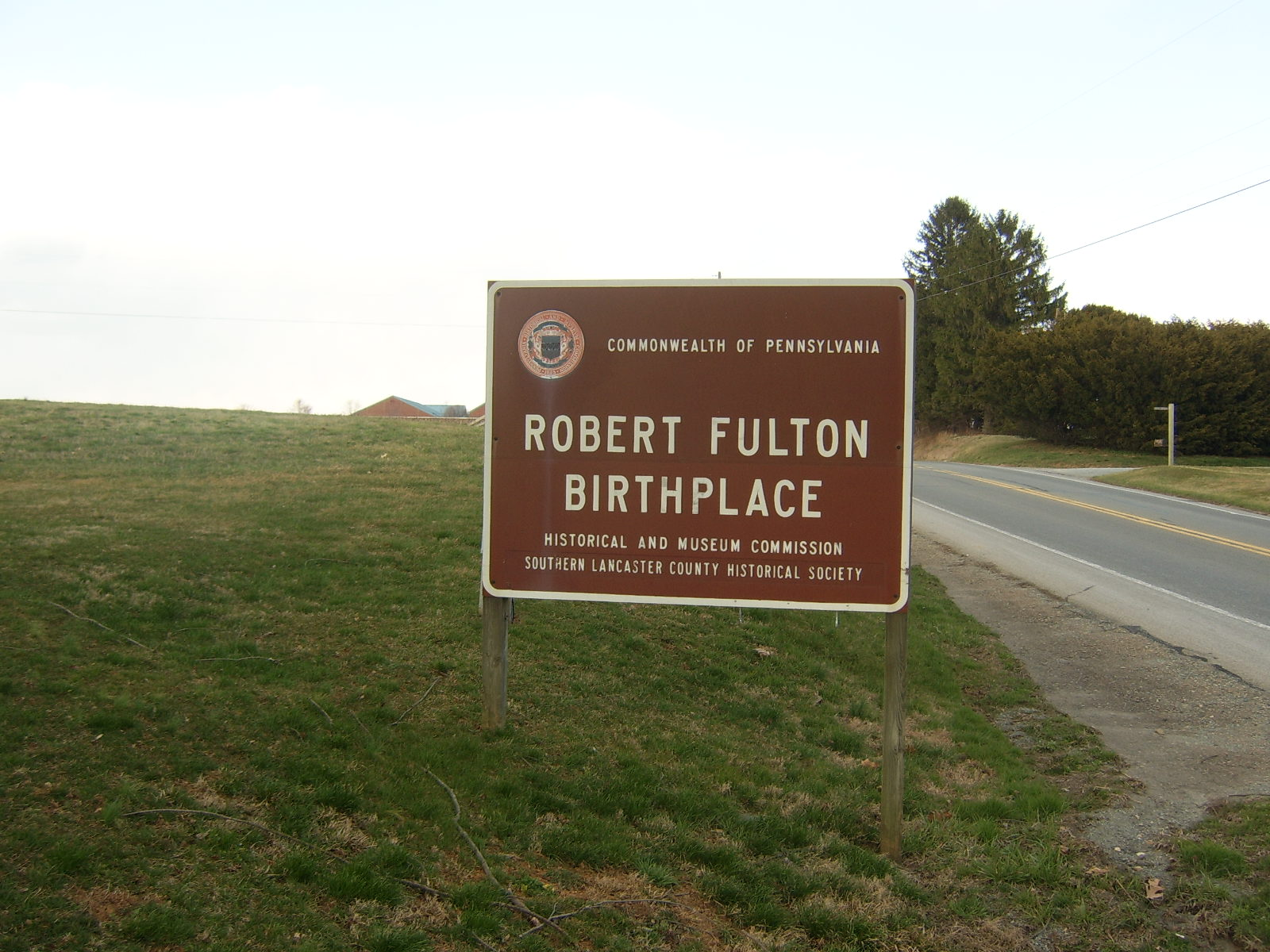

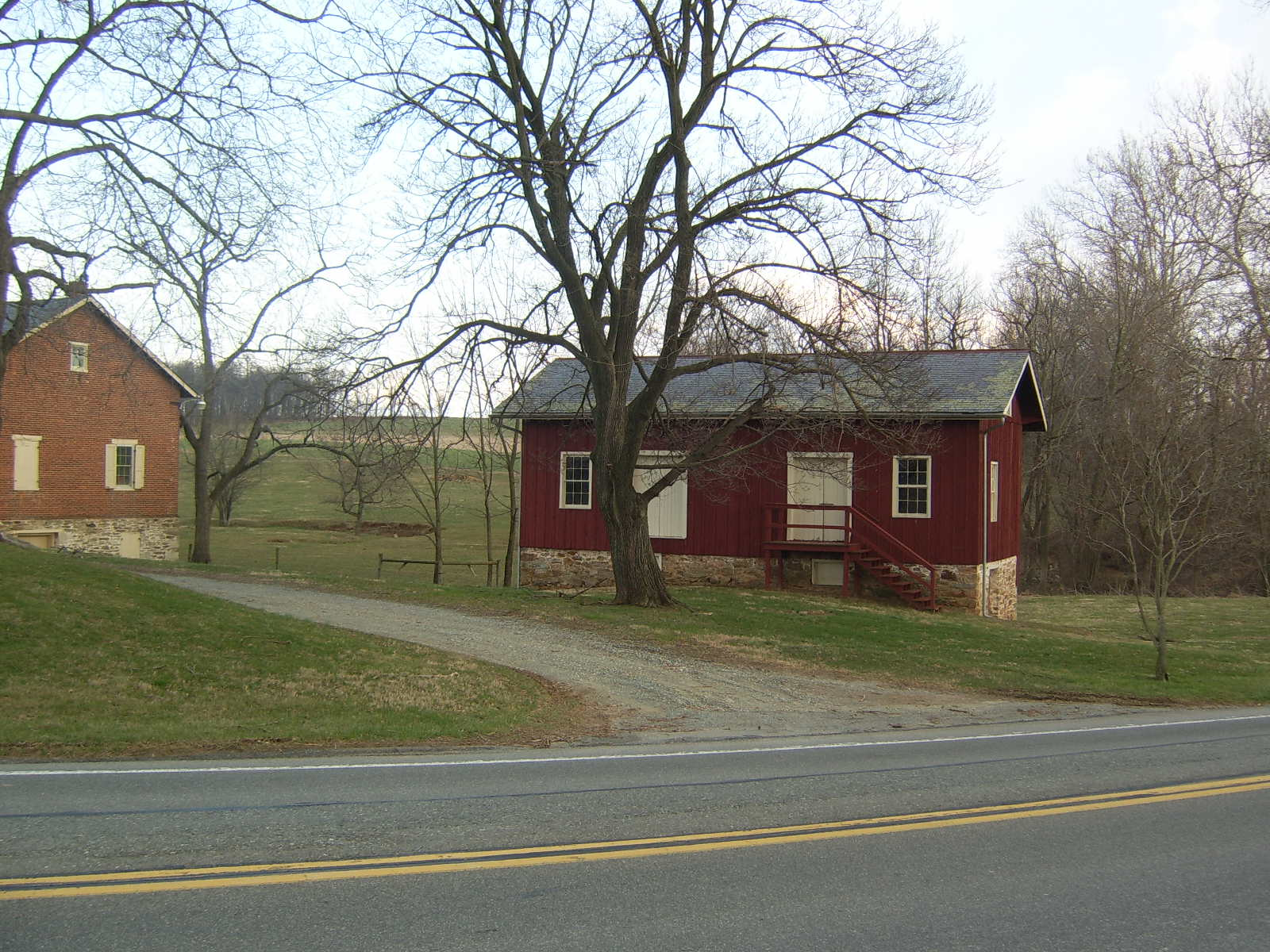

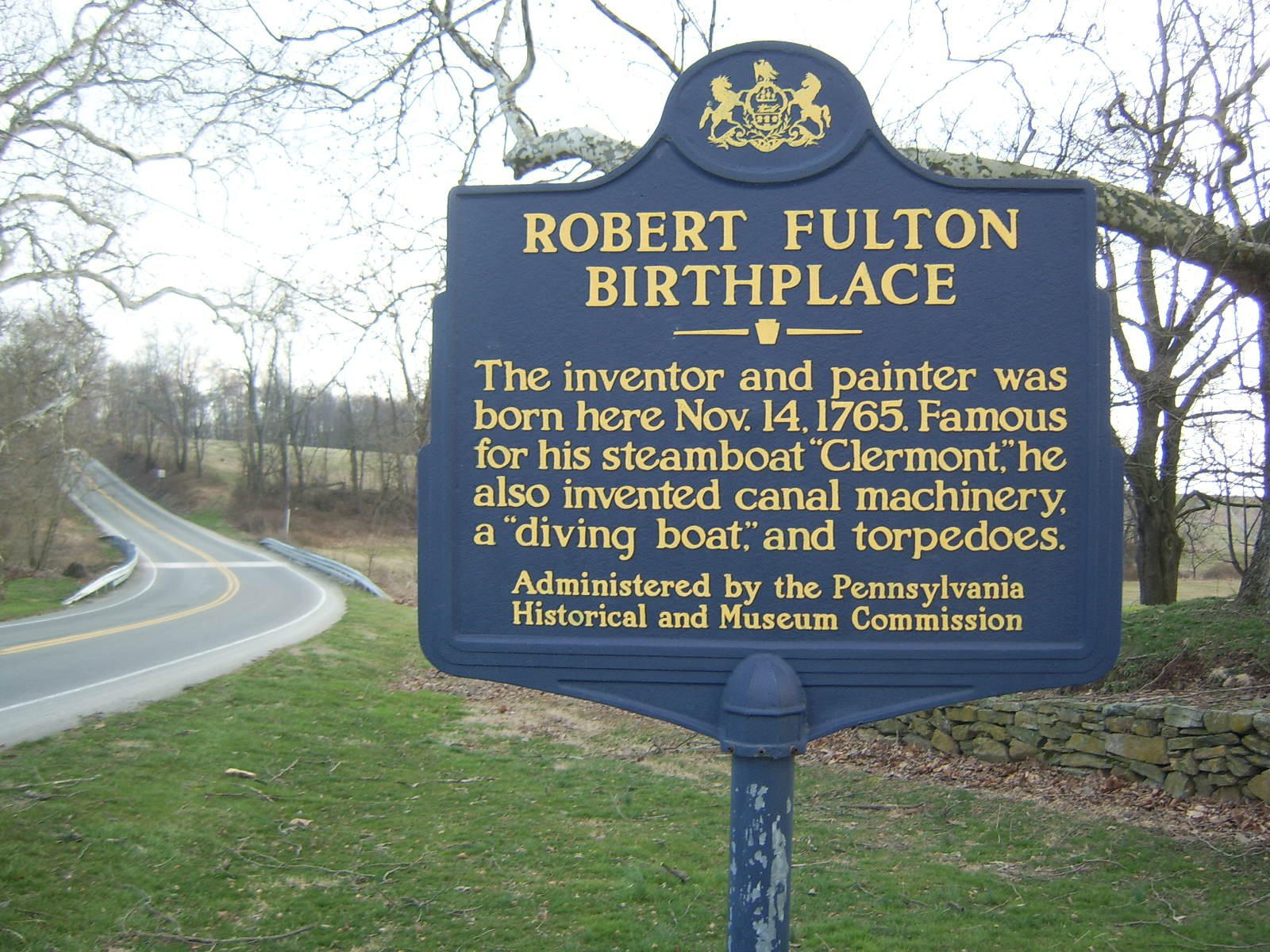

== See also ==
- List of National Historic Landmarks in Pennsylvania
- National Register of Historic Places listings in Lancaster County, Pennsylvania
