= Witmer's Tavern =

- U.S. National Register of Historic Places
- Pennsylvania state historical marker
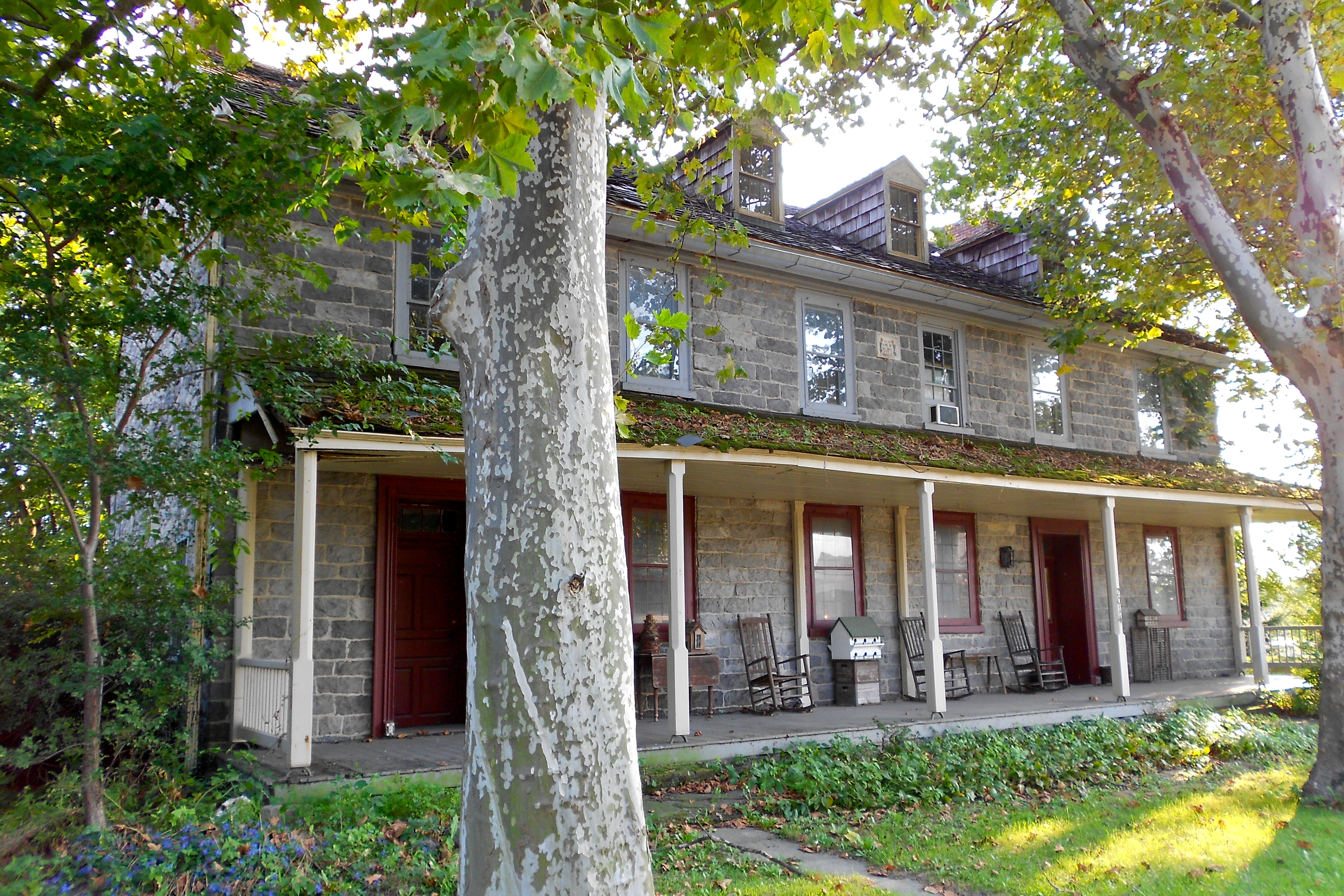
- The front of the tavern hidden by trees in 2012

- Location within Pennsylvania Location within the United States
- Location: 2014 Old Philadelphia Pike, East Lampeter Township, Pennsylvania
- Coordinates: 40°2′23″N 76°14′31″W
- Area: 1 acre (0.40 ha)
- Built: c.1725–1773
- NRHP reference No.: 78002416

Significant dates
- Added to NRHP: December 1, 1978
- Designated PHMC: September 26, 1988

Witmer's Tavern, is an historic structure that is located in East Lampeter Township, Lancaster County, Pennsylvania, just east of U.S. 30 on Old Philadelphia Pike. This building known as Witmer's Tavern should not be confused with the other Witmer's Tavern more commonly known as the Conestoga Restaurant or Conestoga Inn that is located on Route 462 at Bridgeport just east of Lancaster City.

This building was listed on the National Register of Historic Places in 1978.

== History and architectural features ==
This historic structure is a large 2 1/2-story, rectangular, blue limestone building. The original section was purportedly built circa 1725, although no conclusive evidence proves this date; it was subsequently expanded in 1773, and was renovated in 1978. It was later operated as a bed-and-breakfast.

Until 2005, the property had two barns, but they were torn down after a significant portion of the property was sold to build town houses.

The property was sold in 2007 and the remaining stone structure was used as an antique shop. In 2017, ownership of the parcel transferred an investment group based in South Carolina. As of 2018, the property was in severe disrepair and had been for sale for an extended period of time. It finally sold on January 31, 2019.

== Gallery ==
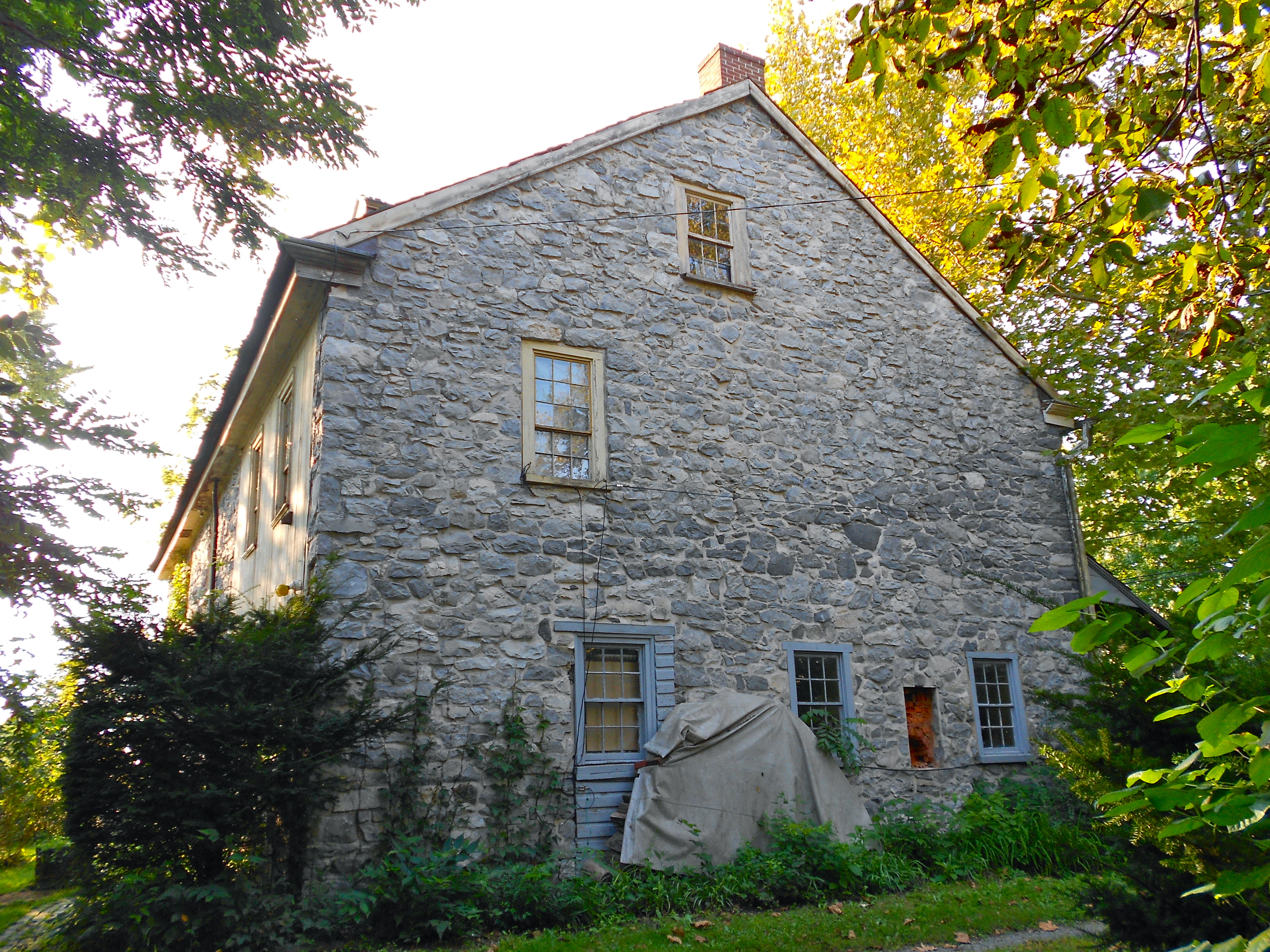
Eastern side of the tavern
