= Strasburg Historic District (Strasburg, Pennsylvania) =

Historic district in Pennsylvania, United States

- U.S. National Register of Historic Places
- U.S. Historic district
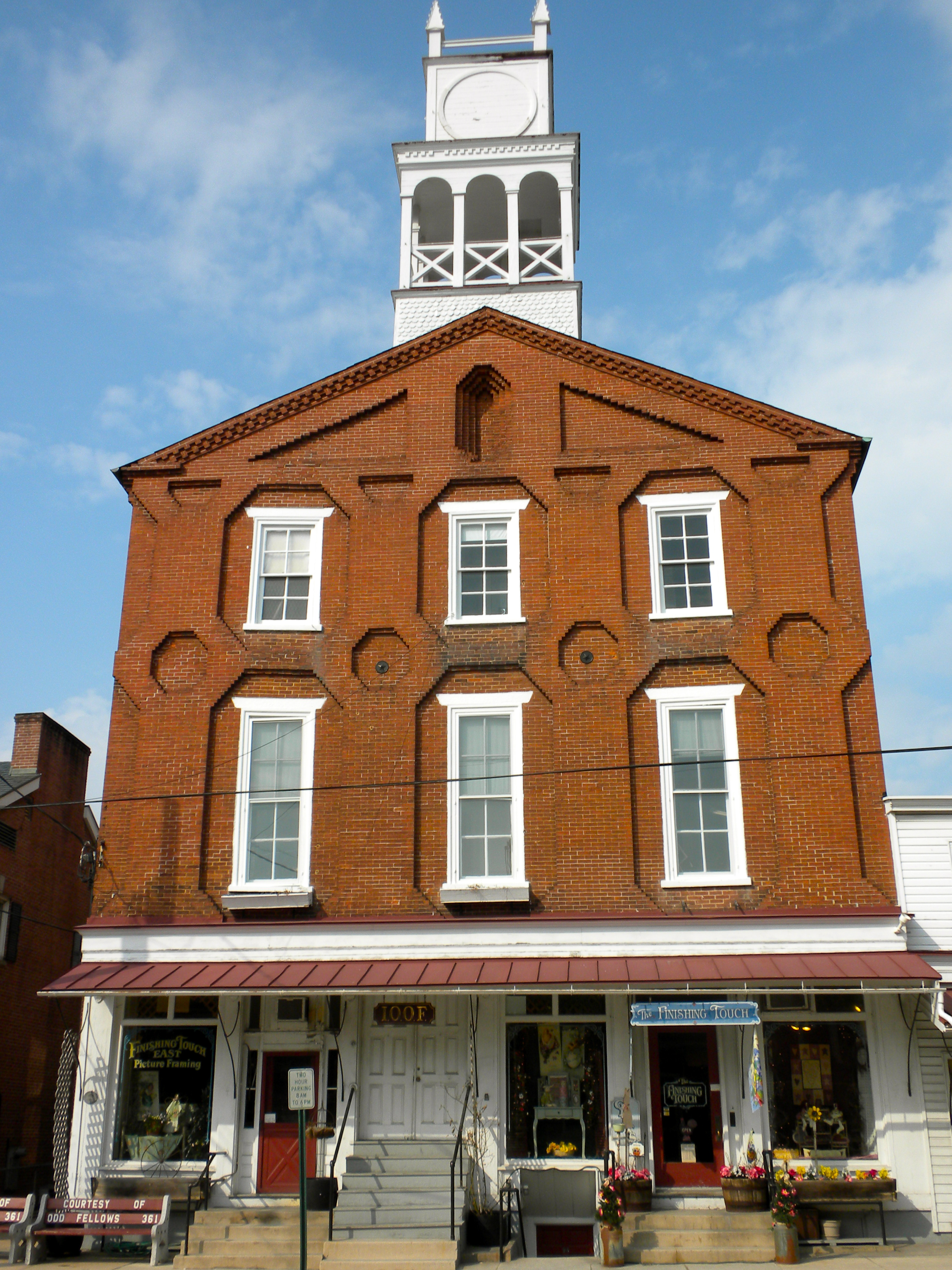
- Strasburg Odd Fellows Hall, March 2010

- Location within Pennsylvania Location within the United States
- Location: E. and W. Main, W. Miller, S. Decatur Sts., Strasburg, Pennsylvania
- Coordinates: 39°58′51″N 76°11′15″W
- Area: 68 acres (28 ha)
- Architectural style: Georgian, Federal, German vernacular
- NRHP reference No.: 83002258
- Added to NRHP: March 3, 1983

The Strasburg Historic District is a national historic district that is located in Strasburg, Lancaster County, Pennsylvania.

It was listed on the National Register of Historic Places in 1983.

== History and architectural features ==
This district includes 206 contributing buildings and one contributing site that are located in the central business district and surrounding residential areas of Strasburg, including notable examples of German, vernacular, Georgian and Federal architectural styles that were built using log, brick, limestone, and sandstone. Some of these structures date to before 1815.

The building at 33 East Main Street, now known as the Limestone Inn, was built in 1786. It was the home of Strasburg's first chief burgess (mayor) and served as the first post office beginning in 1805. As many as fifty students from the Strasburg Academy boarded in the house from 1839 to 1860.

== Gallery ==
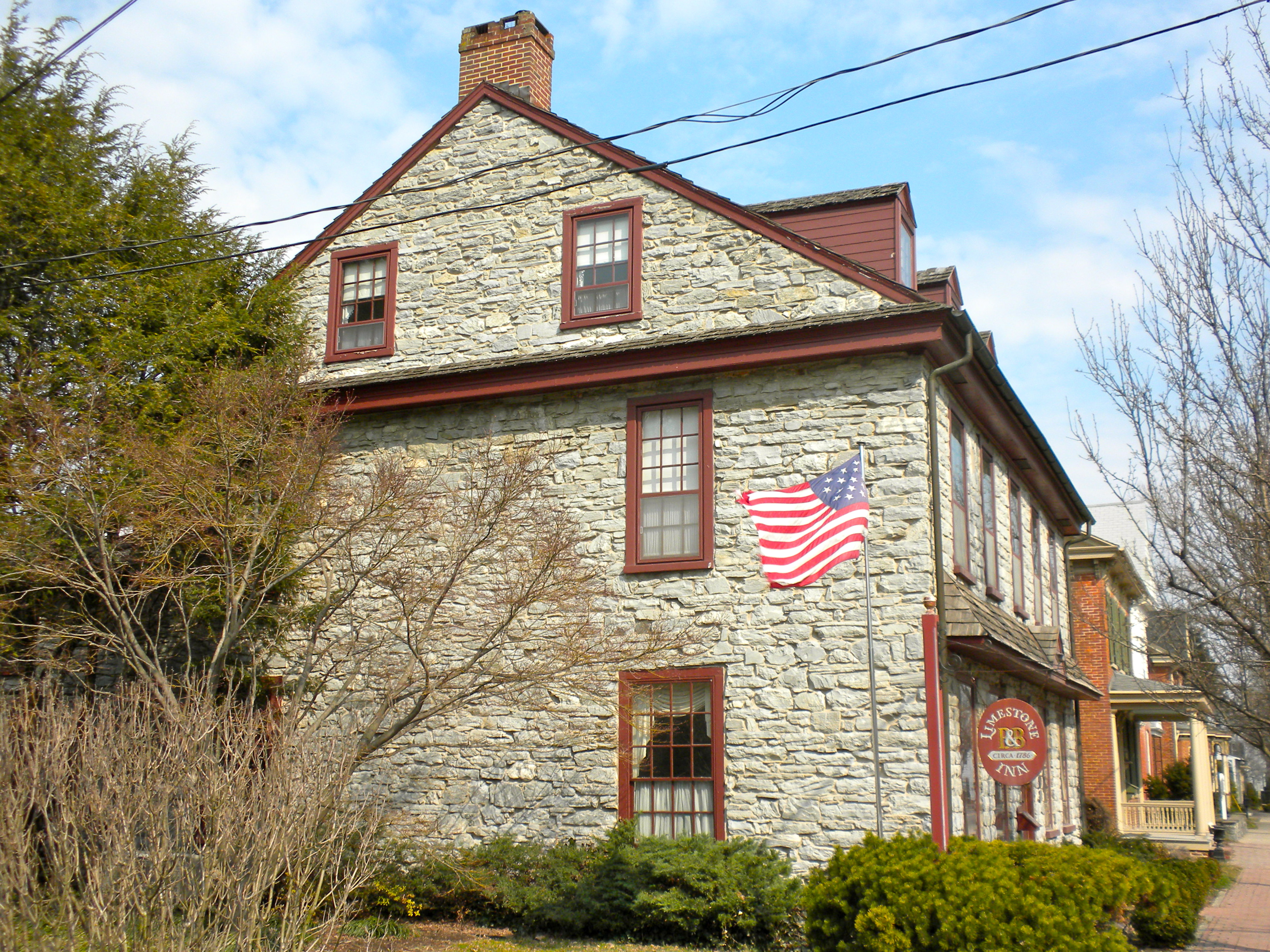
Strasburg's first post office, now the Limestone Inn

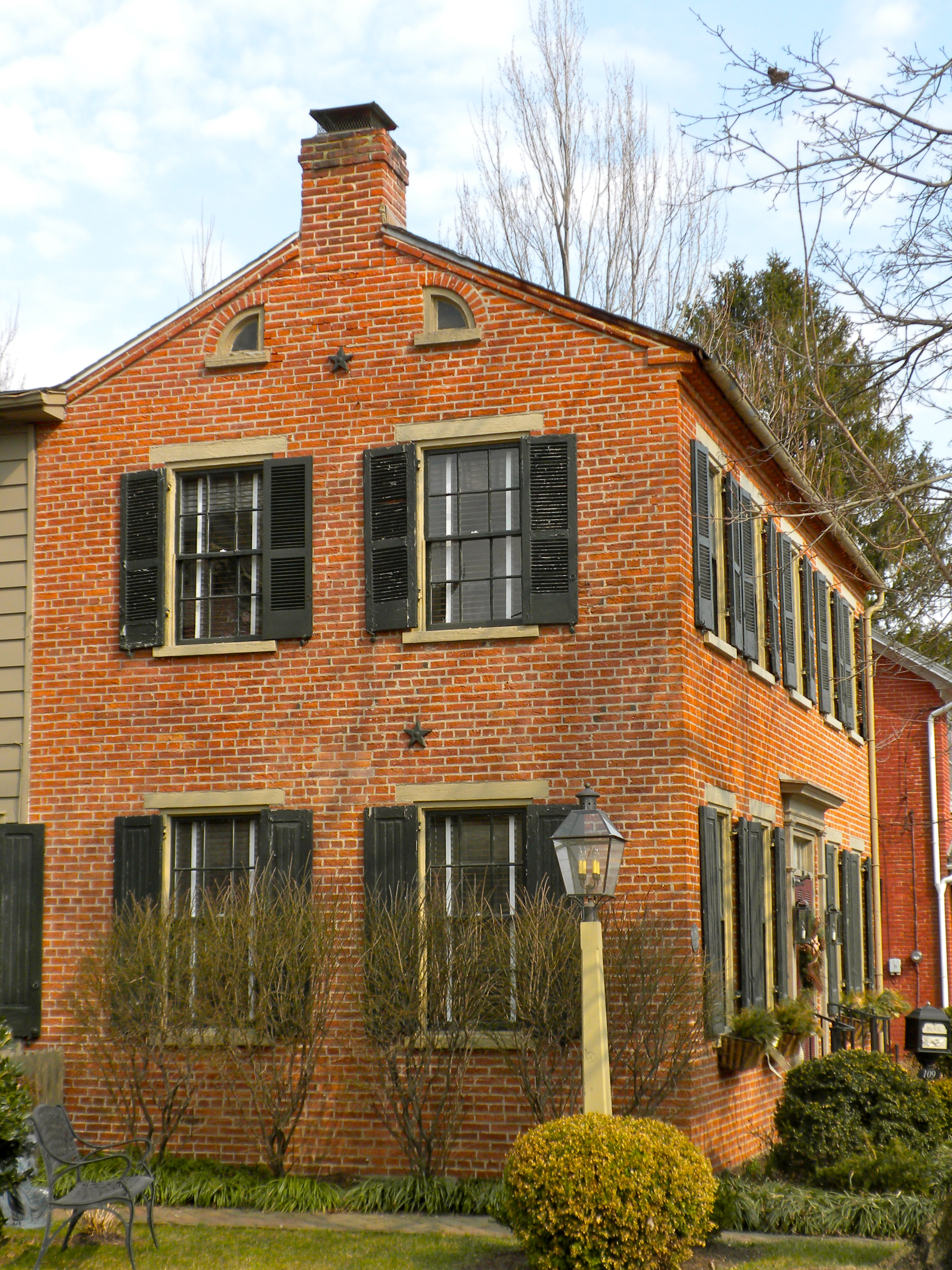
109 E. Main

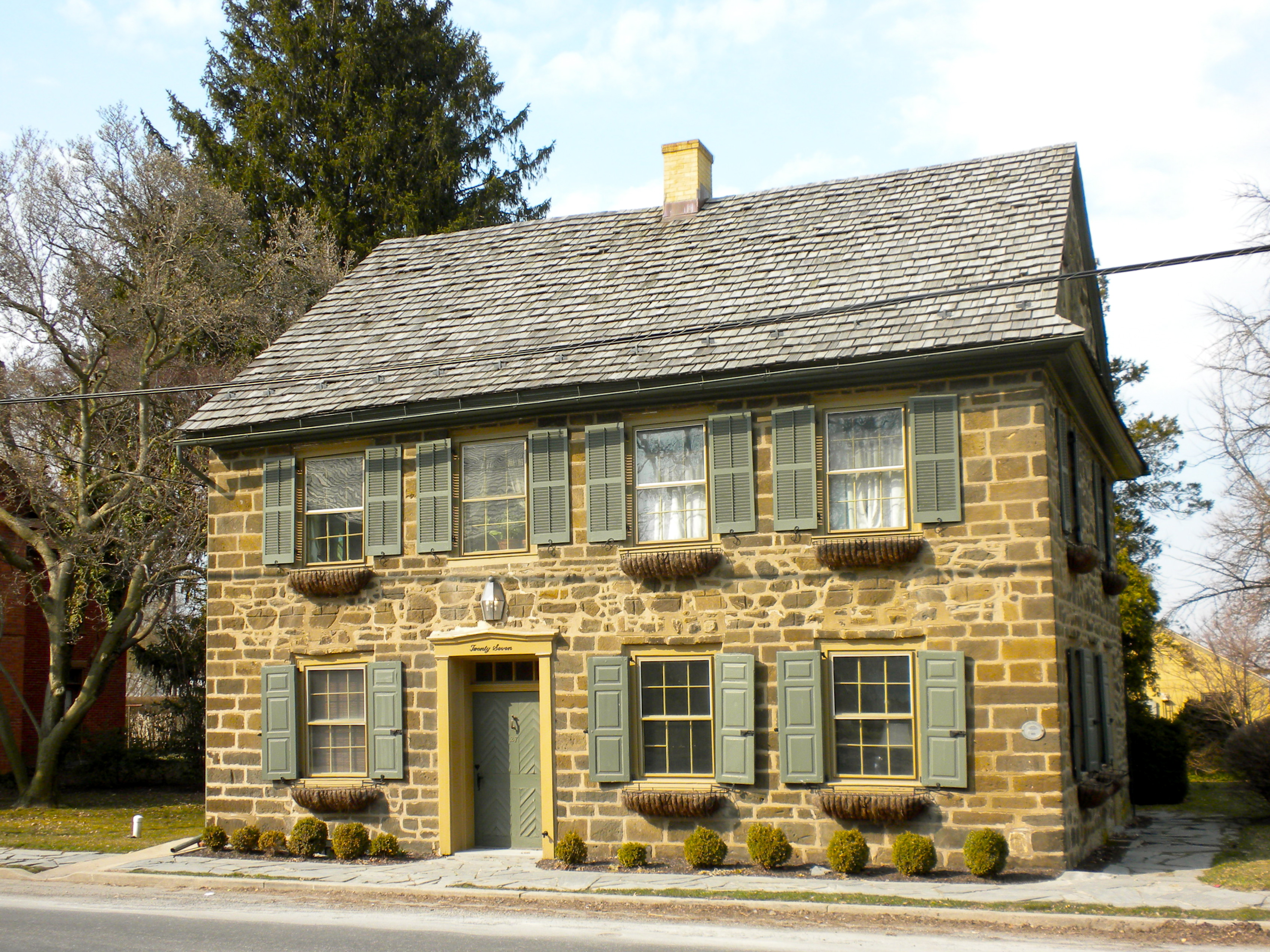
27 E. Main St., built c. 1754

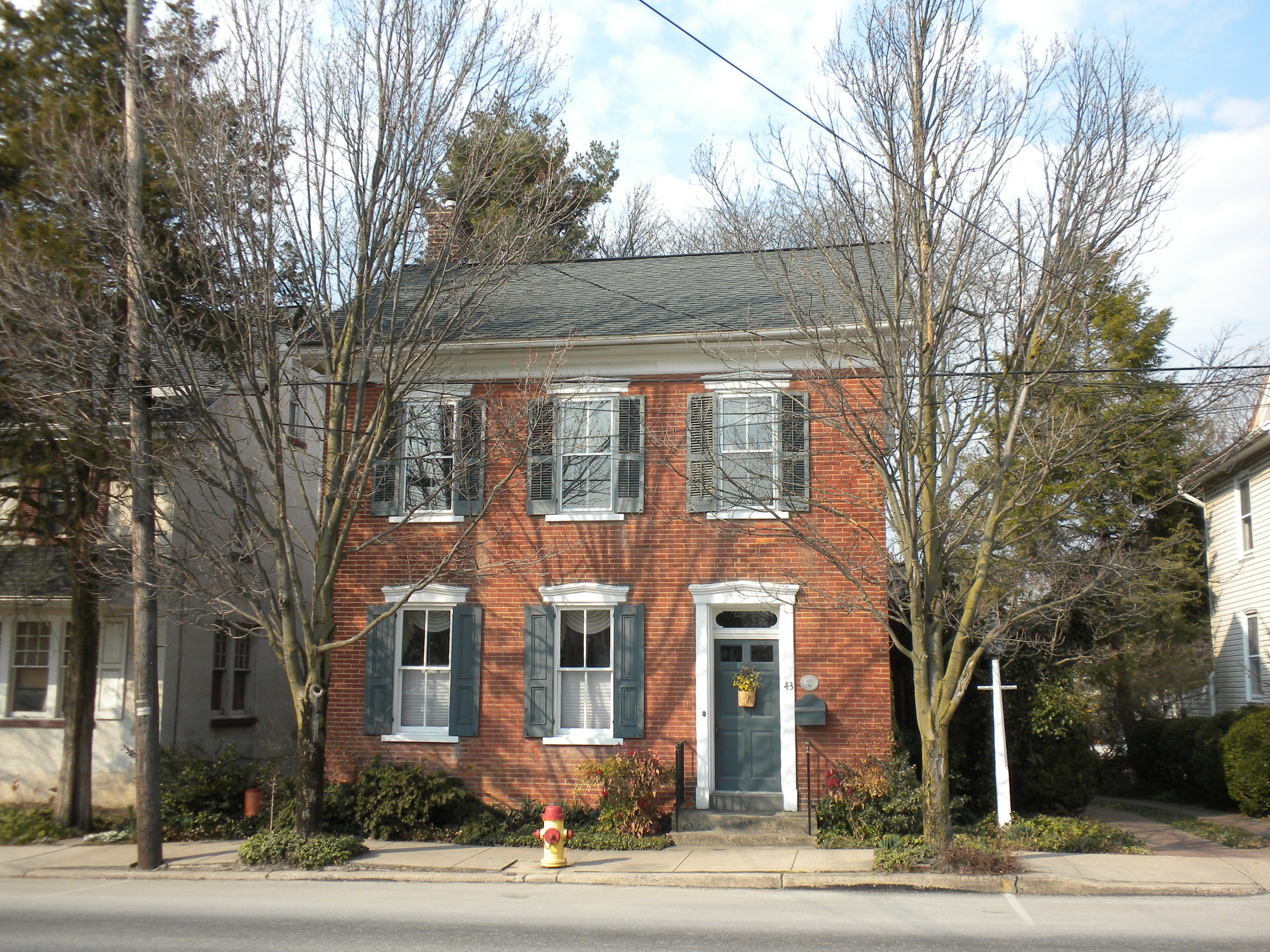
43 W. Main St.

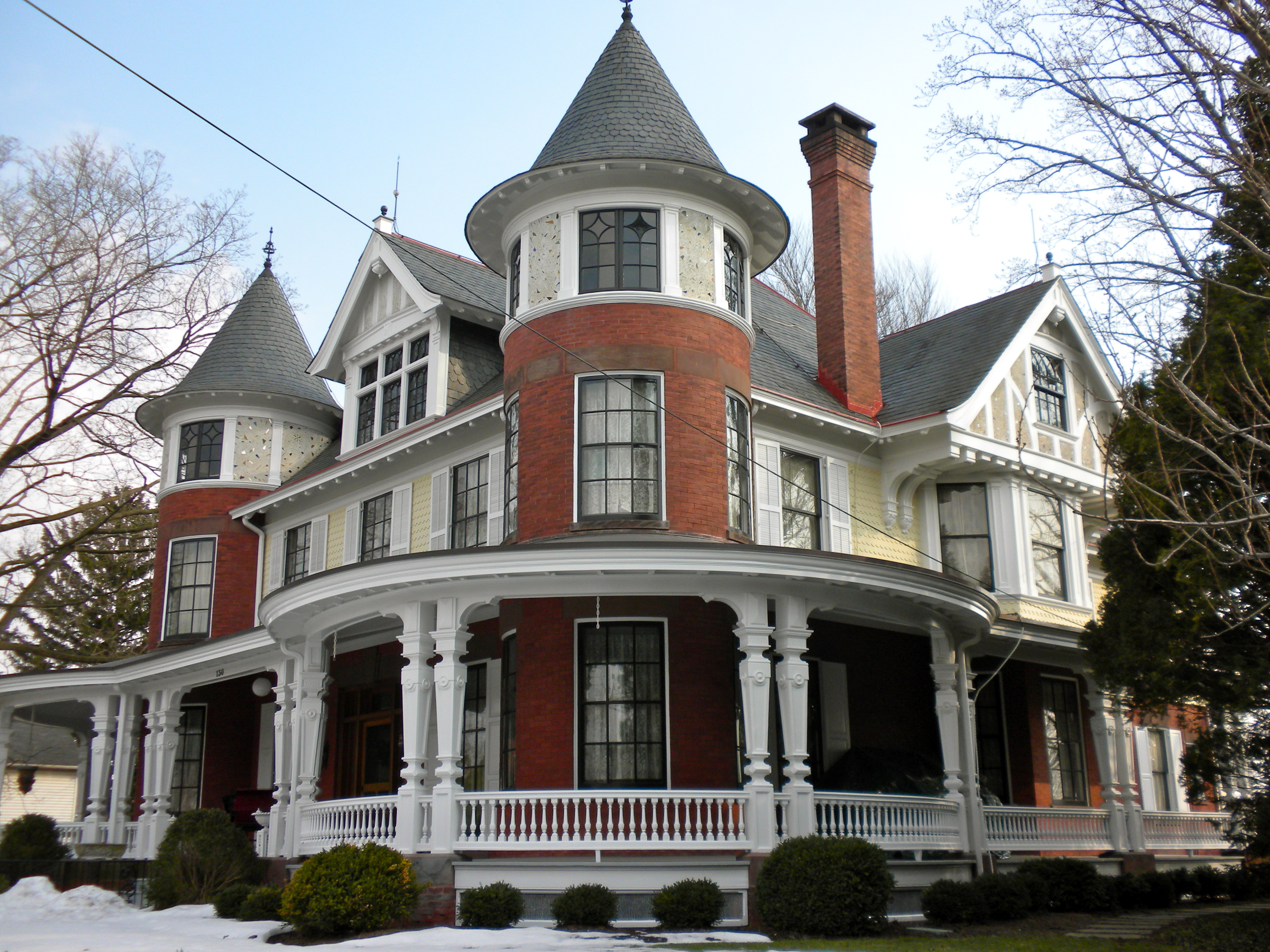
130 W. Main St

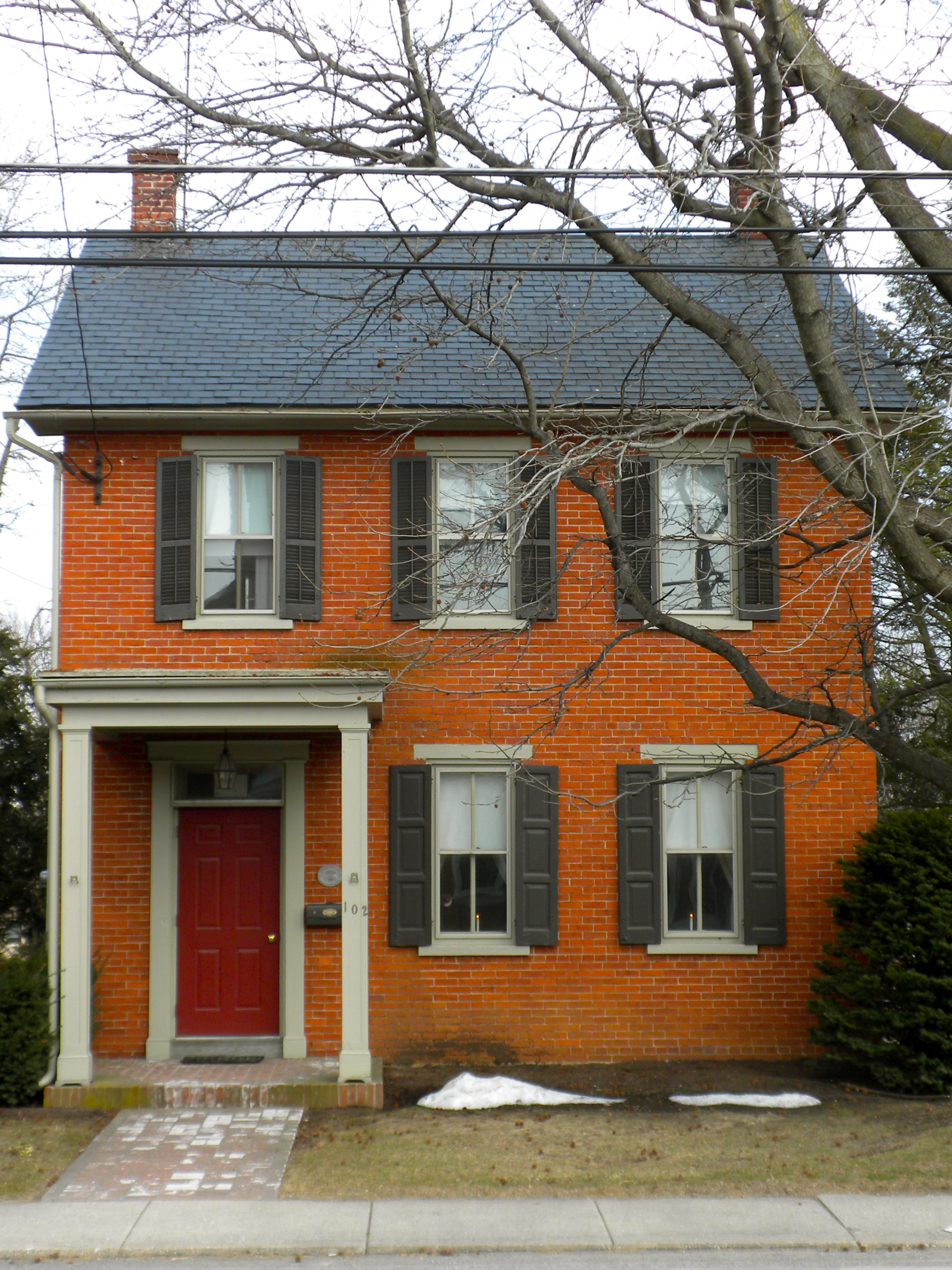
102 S. Decatur St.
