= Lancaster Township, Lancaster County, Pennsylvania =

Township in Pennsylvania, US

Coordinates: 40°01′00″N 76°19′59″W

- Township
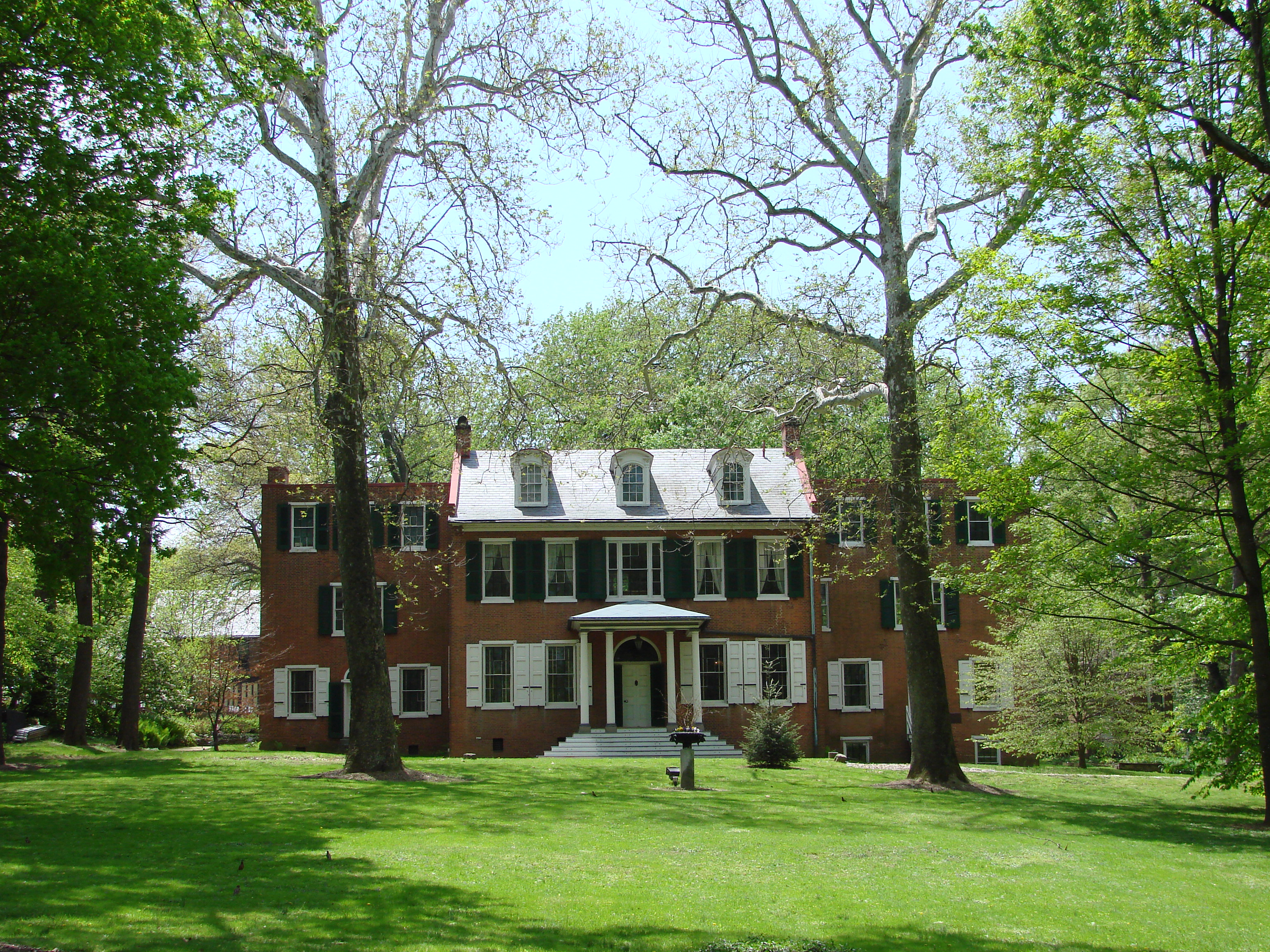
- Wheatland (1828); James Buchanan House; National Register of Historic Places

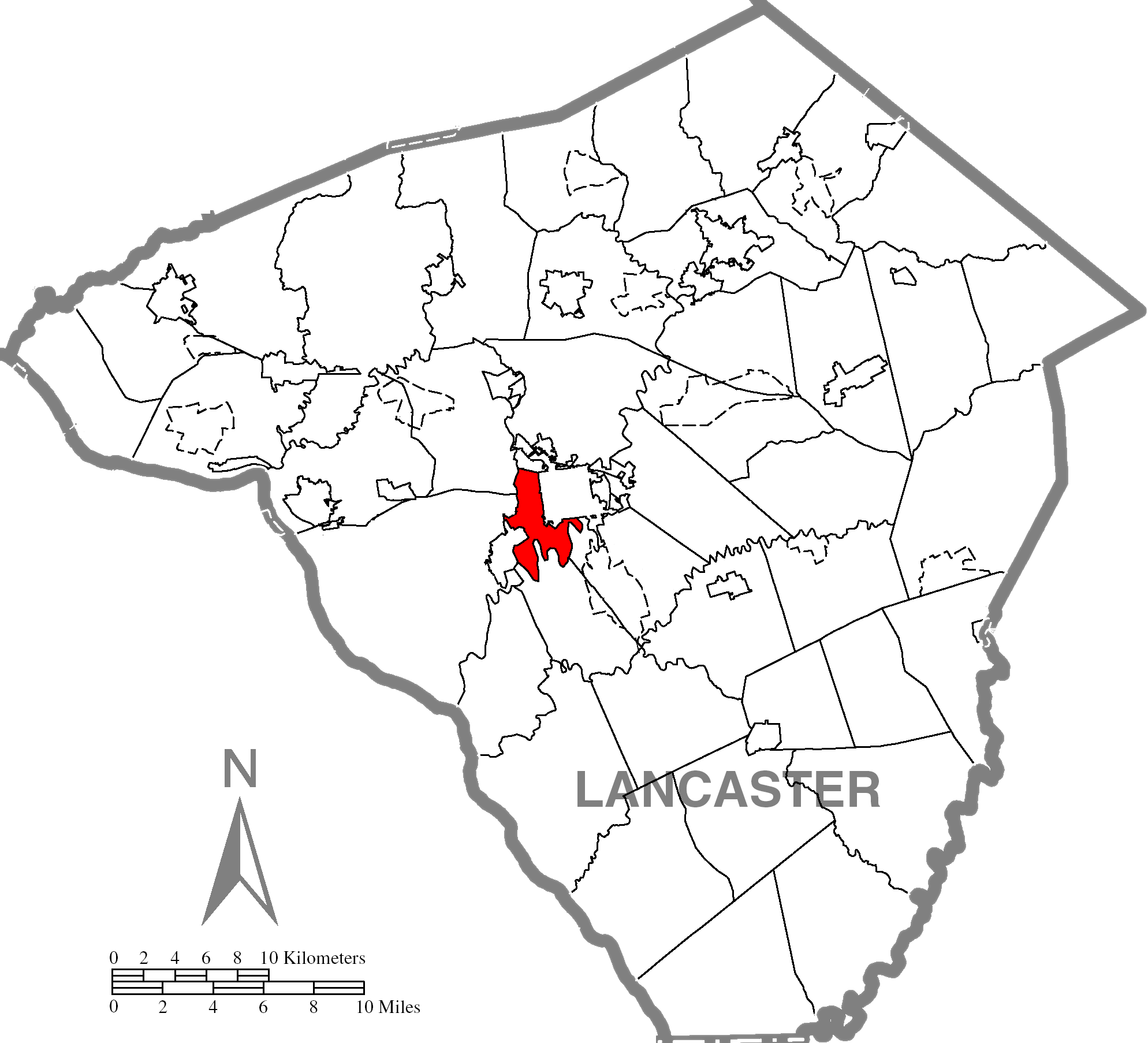
- Map of Lancaster County highlighting Lancaster Township
- Country: United States
- State: Pennsylvania
- County: Lancaster
- Settled: 1717
- Incorporated: 1729

Government
  - Type: Board of Supervisors

Area
  - Total: 6.06 sq mi (15.69 km^{2})
  - Land: 5.86 sq mi (15.17 km^{2})
  - Water: 0.20 sq mi (0.52 km^{2})

Population (2020)
  - Total: 18,591 ▲
  - Estimate (2021): 18,496
  - Density: 2,915.4/sq mi (1,125.65/km^{2})
- Time zone: UTC-5 (Eastern (EST))
  - Summer (DST): UTC-4 (EDT)
- Area code: 717
- FIPS code: 42-071-41224
- Website: www.twp.lancaster.pa.us

Lancaster Township is a civil township of Lancaster County, Pennsylvania, United States. It is in the central area of the county, and it immediately surrounds the city of Lancaster. As of the 2020 census, the township population was 18,591.

Lancaster Township is one of the six immediate suburbs of the city of Lancaster, all sharing the same official designation as "Lancaster, Pennsylvania", by the United States Postal Service.

== History ==
Lancaster Township was established in 1729 as one of seventeen original townships in Lancaster County. It was the smallest of the townships, with its boundaries being defined by the Conestoga River, Manor Township, the Little Conestoga Creek, (East) Hempfield Township, and Manheim Township. A two-mile square was later cut out of the northern part of Lancaster Township to create the county seat of Lancaster City.

The creation of the county caused an influx of people to come to Lancaster City, and Lancaster Township, its closest suburb, received many people too, with many people living here and working in the city. As Lancaster became larger and more prominent, larger roads and railroads needed to extend out to its suburbs, including Lancaster Township. The town even had its own canal, the Conestoga Navigation Canal on the Conestoga River.

Lancaster Township's growth was slow but steady, with about 150 people joining the community each decade prior to 1900. Since then, as the Industrial Revolution came to a close, Lancaster Township has been transformed into a mostly residential municipality.

== Geography ==
According to the United States Census Bureau, the township has a total area of 6.0 square miles (16 km^{2}), all land. It is bounded by the Conestoga River to the south and east and its tributary, Little Conestoga Creek, to the west.

Most of the township lies to the west and south of the city of Lancaster, but smaller exclaves of the township lie to the east and southeast of the city. Its neighboring municipalities are Manheim Township, the city of Lancaster, East Lampeter Township, Pequea Township, the borough of Millersville, Manor Township, and East Hempfield Township.

The township contains the village of Bausman, an unincorporated community that has its own post office and ZIP code (17504), while the rest of the township is covered by 17603 and 17602. Other named locations in the township are School Lane Hills, Woodlawn, Hamilton Park, Colonial Manor, Wabank, Engleside, and Conestoga Woods.

The township is home to President James Buchanan's summer residence, Wheatland, located at 1120 Marietta Avenue. The 1828 Federal-style mansion is a National Historic Landmark and has been restored to reflect the period of Buchanan's occupancy in the mid-19th century. Wheatland is featured within the township's seal.

== Government and politics ==
Lancaster Township is governed by a three-member Board of Supervisors, who serve staggered six-year terms. The current supervisors are Benjamin Bamford, Steven Elliott, and Iber Guerrero Lopez. Their terms expire at the end of 2027, 2029, and 2025, respectively.

In the municipal election on November 3, 2009, Tony Allen was defeated in his bid for a fourth term as supervisor by Democrat Benjamin Bamford in a very close race. Initial results gave Bamford an 11-vote margin of victory, or less than one-half of one percent of votes cast. Unofficial results had 1,188 votes for Bamford to 1,177 votes for Allen. After 27 registered voters petitioned the elections board, a later manual recount increased Bamford's margin to 13 votes out of 2,371 votes cast, with 1,192 votes for Bamford to Allen's 1,179 (50.2% to 49.8%). In a county with a strong history of voting for Republicans, Bamford's victory made history. When Bamford took office, Lancaster Township became the first township in the county to be governed by a board that was majority Democratic.

== Demographics ==
Historical population
Census	Pop.	Note	%±
2000	13,944		—
2010	16,149		15.8%
2020	18,591		15.1%
2021 (est.)	17,496		−5.9%
U.S. Decennial Census

As of the census of 2000, there were 13,944 people, 5,892 households, and 3,694 families residing in the township. The population density was 2,314.9 inhabitants per square mile (893.8/km^{2}). There were 6,094 housing units at an average density of 1,011.7 per square mile (390.6/km^{2}). The racial makeup of the township was 84.08% White, 6.45% African American, 0.09% Native American, 2.09% Asian, 0.01% Pacific Islander, 5.24% from other races, and 2.03% from two or more races. Hispanic or Latino of any race were 9.65% of the population.

There were 5,892 households, out of which 25.5% had children under the age of 18 living with them, 49.8% were married couples living together, 9.7% had a female householder with no husband present, and 37.3% were non-families. 28.7% of all households were made up of individuals, and 11.0% had someone living alone who was 65 years of age or older. The average household size was 2.29 and the average family size was 2.82.

In the township, the population was spread out, with 20.7% under the age of 18, 9.3% from 18 to 24, 28.3% from 25 to 44, 22.3% from 45 to 64, and 19.4% who were 65 years of age or older. The median age was 39 years. For every 100 females, there were 85.9 males. For every 100 females age 18 and over, there were 82.4 males.

The median income for a household in the township was $44,459, and the median income for a family was $52,961. Males had a median income of $37,522 versus $26,286 for females. The per capita income for the township was $25,555. About 7.0% of families and 9.9% of the population were below the poverty line, including 18.3% of those under age 18 and 5.4% of those age 65 or over.

== Education ==
Lancaster Township, as well as Lancaster City proper, are served by the School District of Lancaster. The school district has 13 elementary schools, four middle schools, and one high school. Of these, three elementary schools (Rita Smith Wade-El, Thomas H. Burrowes, and Elizabeth R. Martin) and one middle school (Wheatland) are located in the township.
