= List of Native American archaeological sites on the National Register of Historic Places in Pennsylvania =

This is a list of Native American archaeological sites on the National Register of Historic Places in Pennsylvania.

Historic sites in the United States qualify to be listed on the National Register of Historic Places by passing one or more of four different criteria; Criterion D permits the inclusion of proven and potential archaeological sites. Approximately one hundred different sites in Pennsylvania are listed under this criterion, including both Native American and European sites. This list includes all properties in Pennsylvania that qualify under Criterion D due to the presence of Native American artifacts.

== Sites ==
	Landmark name	Image	Location	County	Culture	Comments
1	Archeological Site 36 LY 37		Loyalsock Township: coextensive with Canfield Island; 41°14′32″N 76°57′11″W	Lycoming	Multiple: Late Archaic through Susquehannock	
2	Big and Little Indian Rock Petroglyphs		Conestoga Township: in the Susquehanna River, south of Safe Harbor; 39°55′15″N 76°23′5″W	Lancaster	Unknown	
3	Book Site (36 Jul)		Beale Township: off Legislative Route 3019; 40°28′44.5″N 77°30′2.4″W	Juniata	Clemson Island	
4	Calver Island		Swatara Township: in the Susquehanna River, southeast of Harrisburg; 40°12′20″N 76°48′24″W	Dauphin	Multiple: Late Archaic through Early Woodland	
5	Carbaugh Run Rhyolite Quarry Site (36AD30)		Franklin Township: atop Snaggy Ridge, west of Carbaugh Run; 39°53′2.4″N 77°27′26.4″W	Adams	Multiple: Late Archaic through Early Woodland	
6	Clemson Island Prehistoric District		Halifax Township: southern portion of Clemson Island in the Susquehanna River; 40°26′59″N 76°56′41.5″W	Dauphin	Multiple: Early Archaic through Late Woodland	Type site for the Clemson Island culture
7	Conestoga Town		Manor Township: junction of Safe Harbor and Indian Marker Rds., near Letort; 39°57′35.4″N 76°24′1.4″W	Lancaster	Susquehannock	
8	Deffenbaugh Site (36FA57)		Nicholson Township: on a saddle between two hills, along Old Frame Rd. 39°48′7.2″N 79°51′36″W	Fayette	Monongahela	
9	Duncan Island (36LA60,61)		Martic Township: in the Susquehanna River above Holtwood; 39°51′41″N 76°21′49″W	Lancaster	Archaic	
10	Dykeman's Spring		Shippensburg: Dykeman Rd., 0.25 miles (0.40 km) east of Pennsylvania Route 696; 40°2′33″N 77°30′57″W	Cumberland	Multiple: Early Archaic through Woodland	
11	Fisher Farm Site		Unionville: along U.S. Route 220, straddling a rail line 40°54′15.6″N 77°52′40″W	Centre	Late Woodland	
12	Fisher Site (36GR21)		Richhill Township: off Camp Resort Rd. along the Enlow Fork; 39°57′36″N 80°28′0″W	Greene	Monongahela	
13	Richard T. Foley Site (36GR52)		Jackson Township: along Job Creek; 39°49′50.7″N 80°22′54″W	Greene	Monongahela	
14	Francis Farm Petroglyphs Site (36FA35)		Jefferson Township: off Perry Road, 1 mile (1.6 km) west of the junction of Pennsylvania Routes 51 and 201; 40°3′0″N 79°47′30″W	Fayette	Unknown	
15	Frey-Haverstick Site (36LA6)		Manor Township: eastern side of the Susquehanna River at Washington Boro, north of Staman's Run; 39°59′42″N 76°28′13.8″W	Lancaster	Multiple: Late Archaic through Susquehannock	
16	Household No. 1 Site (36WM61)		Rostraver Township: off Timms Ln. 40°10′27.7″N 79°46′44.4″W	Westmoreland	Monongahela	
17	Houserville Site (36CE65)		College Township: 1300 block of E. College Ave., east of State College; 40°48′42″N 77°50′4″W	Centre	Early and Middle Archaic	
18	Indian God Rock Petroglyphs Site (36VE26)		Rockland Township: on the eastern bank of the Allegheny River above Brandon; 41°19′48″N 79°49′27″W	Venango	Unknown	
19	Byrd Leibhart Site (36YO170)		Lower Windsor Township: Native Lands County Park; 39°58′41.4″N 76°29′54″W	York	Susquehannock	
20	Oscar Leibhart Site (36YO9)		Lower Windsor Township: along the Susquehanna River, north of Klines Run; 39°59′20.4″N 76°30′1″W	York	Susquehannock	
21	Locus 7 Site		Washington Township: on a bluff above Downers Run north of Fayette City, 2,000 feet (610 m) east of the Monongahela River; 40°6′24″N 79°50′13″W	Fayette	Monongahela	
22	Meadowcroft Rockshelter		Independence Township: west of Avella; 40°17′11″N 80°29′30″W	Washington	Multiple: Paleoindian through Late Woodland	
23	Memorial Park Site		Lock Haven: on the southern bank of the Susquehanna River near the confluence of Bald Eagle Creek; 41°8′19.2″N 77°25′4.3″W	Clinton	Clemson Island	
24	Minisink Archeological Site		Dingman Township: in the vicinity of Minisink Island; 41°17′26.2″N 74°49′44.4″W	Pike	Multiple: Early Archaic through Shawnee	
25	Murry Site		Manor Township: 2 miles south of Washington Boro; 39°58′44.4″N 76°27′10.8″W	Lancaster	Susquehannock	
26	North Warwick Historic and Archeological District		Warwick Township: Pennsylvania Route 345 and Harmonyville, Bethesda, Hopewell, Piersol, Trythall, and Northside Rds. 40°11′18″N 75°46′8″W	Chester	Multiple: Late Archaic through Late Woodland	
27	Park Site 36La96		Lancaster: on a knoll in Central Park, midway between the Conestoga River and Mill Creek; 40°1′7″N 76°17′3.7″W	Lancaster	Susquehannock	
28	Roberts Farm Site (36LA1)		Manor Township: on a knoll above the Conestoga River, just above its confluence with the Susquehanna River, near Conestoga; 39°56′42.4″N 76°22′26.8″W	Lancaster	Multiple: Late Archaic through Susquehannock	
29	Shawnee-Minisink Site		Smithfield Township: confluence of Brodhead Creek and the Delaware River; 40°59′25″N 75°8′2.7″W	Monroe	Multiple: Paleoindian through Late Archaic	
30	Shenks Ferry Site (36LA2)		Conestoga Township: along Grubbs Creek north of Pequea, ¾ mile above the Susquehanna River; 39°54′18″N 76°21′36.7″W	Lancaster	Multiple: Shenks Ferry through Susquehannock	Type site for the Shenks Ferry culture
31	Shoop Site (36DA20)		Jackson Township: east of Enders; 40°29′14″N 76°49′12″W	Dauphin	Paleoindian	
32	Shultz-Funk Site (36LA7 and 36LA9)		Manor Township: above the Susquehanna River near Washington Boro, immediately south of Witmer's Run; 39°58′6.4″N 76°27′17.9″W	Lancaster	Late Woodland	
33	Site 36BD90		Bedford Township: on the grounds of Bedford Village; 40°2′31.2″N 78°30′38.4″W	Bedford	Monongahela	
34	Sommerheim Park Archaeological District		Millcreek Township: on bluffs above Sommerheim Dr. and Presque Isle Bay; 42°6′49″N 80°8′42″W	Erie	Multiple: Early Archaic through Middle Woodland	
35	Squirrel Hill Site		St. Clair Township: west of New Florence near the banks of the Conemaugh River; 40°22′49″N 79°5′20.3″W	Westmoreland	Monongahela	
36	Strickler Site		Manor Township: ¾ mile north of Creswell Station, and 1 mile south of Washington Boro; 39°58′48″N 76°27′40″W	Lancaster	Susquehannock	
37	Sugar Grove Petroglyph Site (36GR5)		Monongahela Township: off Pennsylvania Route 88, 0.7 miles (1.1 km) northwest of its bridge over Whiteley Creek; 39°49′36″N 79°57′40″W	Greene	Unknown	
38	Tudek Site		College Township: along Orchard Rd., northeast of State College; 40°49′1″N 77°51′3″W	Centre	Early and Middle Archaic	

== See also ==
- National Register of Historic Places listings in Pennsylvania
- List of European archaeological sites on the National Register of Historic Places in Pennsylvania (i.e. European American)
