= Leibhart Site =

Leibhart Site may refer to:

- Byrd Leibhart Site
- Oscar Leibhart Site
