= Francis Farm Petroglyphs =

- Francis Farm Petroglyphs Site (36FA35)
- U.S. National Register of Historic Places
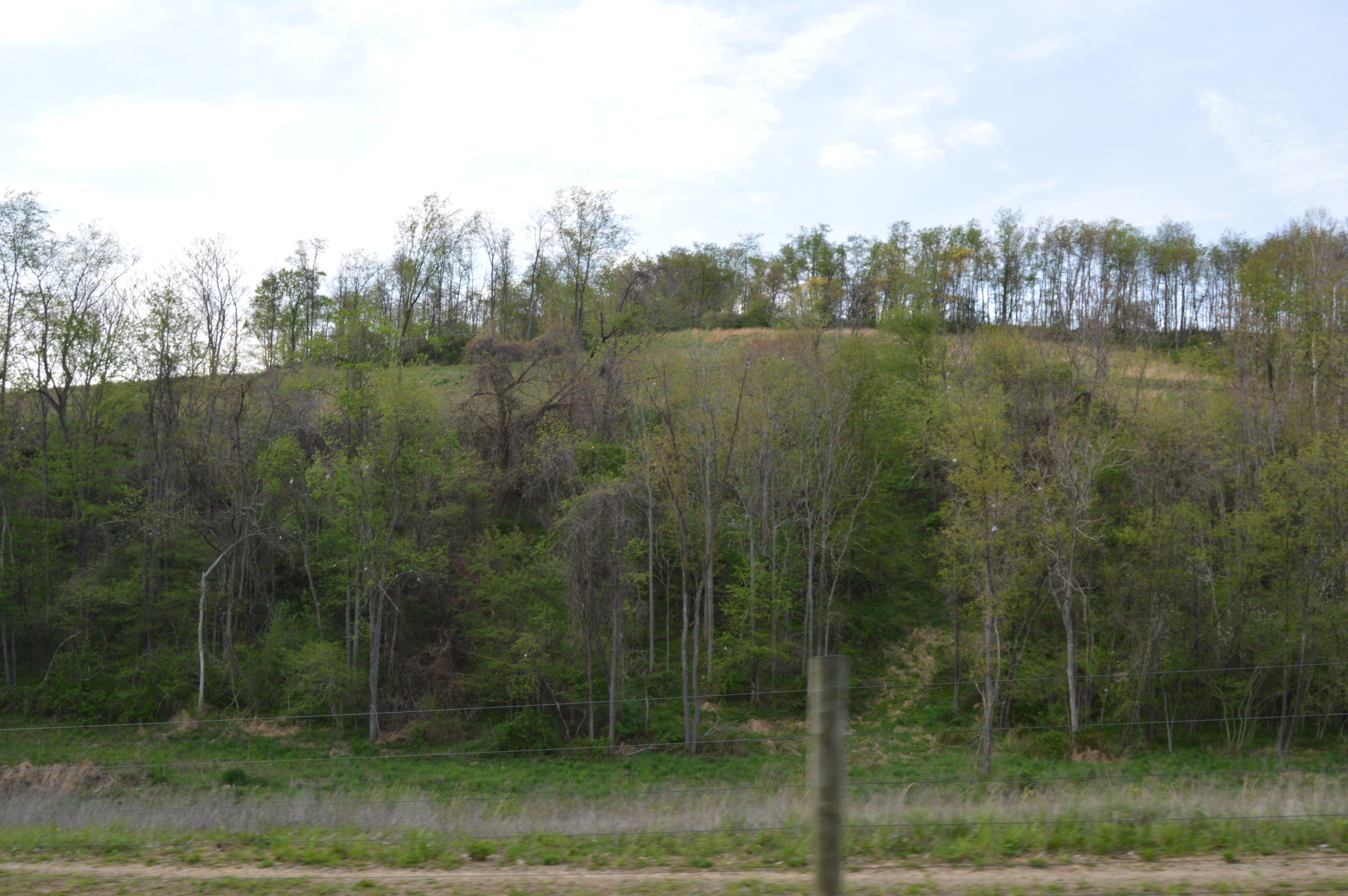
- Overview of the site

- Location within Pennsylvania Location within the United States
- Location: Off Perry Road in Jefferson Township, Fayette County, Pennsylvania, 1 mile (1.6 km) west of the junction of Pennsylvania Routes 51 and 201
- Nearest city: Perryopolis
- Coordinates: 40°3′0″N 79°47′30″W
- Area: 0.1 acres (0.040 ha)
- NRHP reference No.: 84003370
- Added to NRHP: May 10, 1984

The Francis Farm Petroglyphs are a group of petroglyphs in southwestern Pennsylvania, United States. Located on a boulder in Jefferson Township in the northwestern portion of Fayette County, the glyphs have been known to archaeologists since at least the middle of the nineteenth century. Despite damage in the 1930s, they remain an important archaeological site, and accordingly, have been designated a historic site.

== Creation ==
Although it is certain that the Francis Farm site was produced by Native Americans, a more precise identification is believed to be impossible. Archaeologists have proposed that the creators were such peoples as the Monongahela or the ancestors of the Shawnee, both of whom are known to have inhabited southwestern Pennsylvania during the latter portions of the Woodland period.

== Geology ==
The petroglyph site is located on a large outcrop in Jefferson Township, approximately 2.6 miles (4.2 km) west of Perryopolis and 5.2 miles (8.4 km) north of Brownsville; its elevation is 1,140 feet (350 m). This outcrop is a roughly rectangular piece of Dunkard-series sandstone, measuring 6.3 metres (21 ft) from north to south and 5.7 metres (19 ft) from east to west. Its upper surface, upon which the petroglyphs are carven, slants toward the ground; the western end rises 3.2 metres (10 ft) above the surface, while the eastern edge is level with the surface of the ground. Several similar boulders lie in the petroglyph's immediate vicinity, although none feature Native American petroglyphs. The site lies in the middle of woodlands; trees and brush grow up to the stone's edge.

== Petroglyphs ==
Six different outcrops on the Francis Farm have been used for the creation of petroglyphs, although only one today bears Native American carvings. One other boulder, located to the east of the primary stone, once bore similar Native American carvings, however, local residents have reported that it was destroyed in the 1930s, while the surrounding land was being quarried for the construction of a road. Incisions on the other four stones remain in fine condition; however, they are clearly modern works, for among their inscriptions are various Latin letters and depictions of firearms.

At least sixteen different carvings are present on the primary outcrop, divided into seven different categories: artifacts, geometric figures, the human body, mammals, reptiles, a shape resembling the letter "W," and various small pits. Some of the carvings include multiple parts; for example, design 13 is composed of seven small pits, also known as "nut-cracker holes". The most common subject is the human body; designs 2 and 10 depict a complete human form, while designs 1 and 15 are images of human heads. Other images include what is believed to be the mythological "spirit otter" (design 5), a four-footed animal (design 6), and a rattlesnake (design 11). What has been called the letter "W", which also has been found at other petroglyph sites, may be an abstract form; archaeologist James L. Swauger called it a "W" for the sake of simplicity. A small number of carvings, such as arrows and hook-like shapes, are believed to be the work of recent vandals.

The presence of amorphous shapes among the carvings is typical of Native American petroglyphs. Although their meanings are not known, their resemblance to shapes found at similar sites elsewhere in the upper Ohio River valley indicates that many of these sites were produced by the same, or similar cultures. Other designs common to these petroglyphs include the shapes and the footprints of birds, humans, and other mammals.

== Recognition ==
The Francis Farm Petroglyphs have been known since at least the middle of the nineteenth century. Written in 1843, Sherman Day's Historical Collections of the State of Pennsylvania makes reference to the site, as do authors from 1893, 1930, and 1934. Carnegie Museum of Natural History archaeologist James Swauger officially documented the site in late 1958. Despite this widespread documentation, the site has remained remarkably free from damage; natural processes have eroded it somewhat, and Swauger was unable to find certain elements documented by previous surveys, but these aspects are exceptions: almost all designs present in early renditions of the site remain easily distinguished today.

At the time of the European settlement of southwestern Pennsylvania, several petroglyphs were present within Fayette County's present boundaries. Among the sites that survived into modern times were ones known as the New Geneva Petroglyphs, the Petroglyphs Opposite Millsboro, and the Dunn Farm Petroglyphs. Many sites in the upper Ohio River valley, including several in Fayette County, were destroyed in the late twentieth century, making the Francis Farm site extremely valuable for future students of Native American petroglyphy. Because of their archaeological value, the Francis Farm Petroglyphs were listed on the National Register of Historic Places in 1984.

== See also ==
- List of Native American archaeological sites on the National Register of Historic Places in Pennsylvania
