= Richard T. Foley Site =

Historic place in Pennsylvania, United States

- Richard T. Foley Site (36GR52)
- U.S. National Register of Historic Places
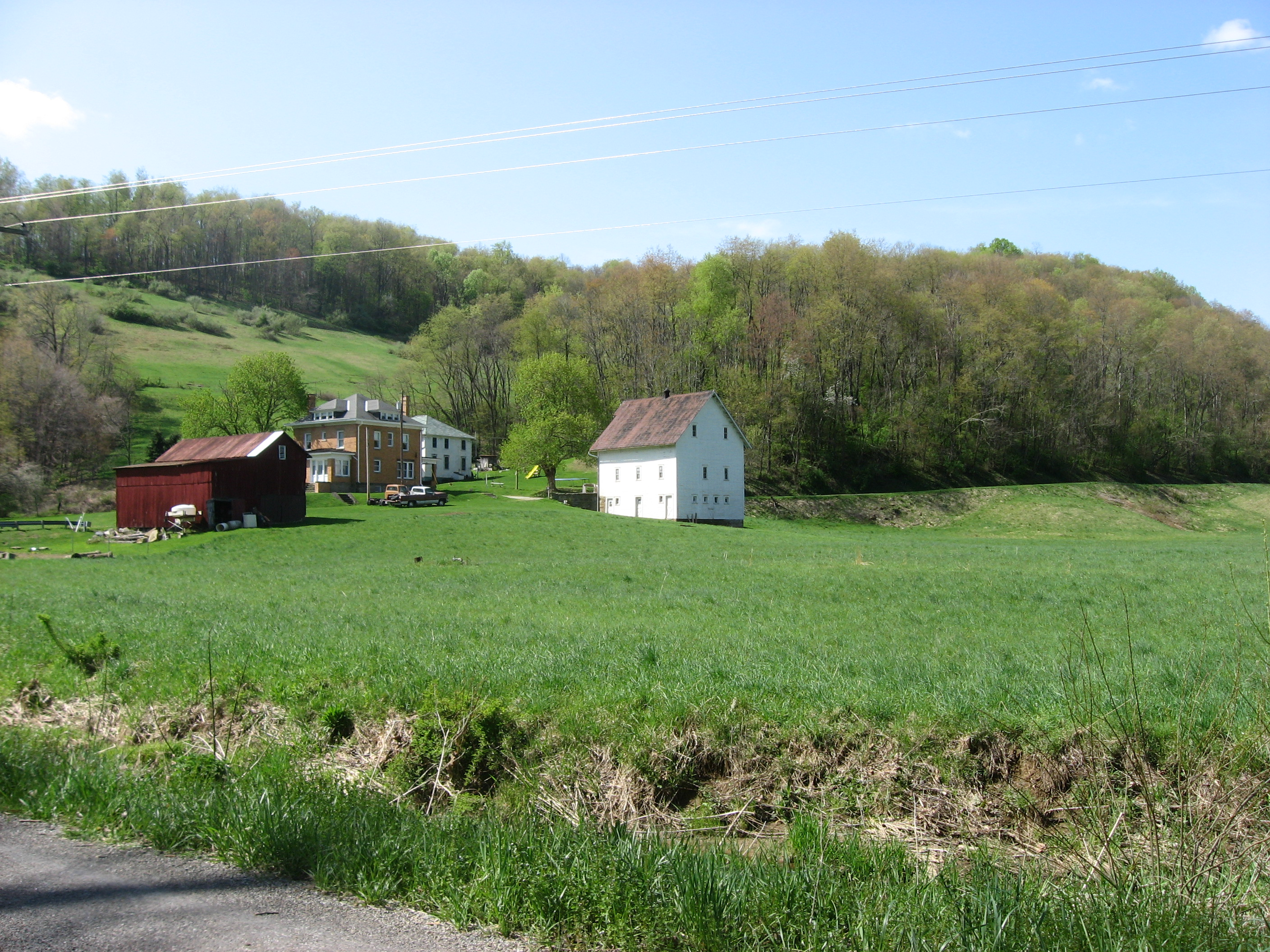
- View of the site from the east

- Location within Pennsylvania Location within the United States
- Location: Holbrook, Pennsylvania
- Coordinates: 39°49′50.7″N 80°22′53.9″W
- Area: 2.2 acres (0.89 ha)
- NRHP reference No.: 84003385
- Added to NRHP: May 10, 1984

The Richard T. Foley Site is an archaeological site in Jackson Township, Greene County, Pennsylvania, United States, in the southwestern corner of the state. Located along Job Creek, the site was known since the late 1960s to local artifact collectors as a valuable collection location. Significant artifacts were discovered by landowner Richard T. Foley in 1971, when he began to plow part of the site to expand his garden. Having found bits of flint, bone, and pottery, Foley contacted local archaeologists, who soon began a three-year excavation of the property. A larger investigation was carried out by archaeologists from the Carnegie Museum of Natural History in 1982; they discovered that the area previously excavated was only the periphery of a larger campsite. Later in 1982, work led by James T. Herbstritt discovered a village site elsewhere on the property.

Grants from the Pennsylvania Historical and Museum Commission and the R.K. Mellon Foundation enabled Herbstritt to lead another excavation in 1984, which examined the village found two years before. The excavation showed that the village had been planned in an oval but consisted of two concentric circles composed of circular houses, at least sixty in number. At the middle of the village appeared evidence of an earlier Monongahela village underlying the larger site. Although most Monongahela villages were stockaded, the village at the Foley Site clearly had no stockade. However, the site was accompanied by a large midden; along with European trade goods found elsewhere at the site, the midden has demonstrated that the site was occupied during the first third of the seventeenth century.

A large number of artifacts found in the midden at the Foley Site are animal-related, including bones of birds and a wide range of animals, as well as shells of box turtles. Also present are metal and clay objects such as beads and combs, but perhaps the most significant discovery at the site was that of European-produced objects made of brass and glass. The presence of these objects enabled archaeologists to determine that the village site was occupied during the Historic Monongahela period. Like the Foley Site, many Monongahela villages are located in river bottoms.

In 1984, the Foley Site was added to the National Register of Historic Places because of its information-yielding potential.

== See also ==
- List of Native American archaeological sites on the National Register of Historic Places in Pennsylvania
