= Bedford Village =

Bedford Village may refer to:

- Bedford Village Archeological Site
- Bedford Village Historic District
