= Household No. 1 Site =

- Household No. 1 Site (36WM61)
- U.S. National Register of Historic Places
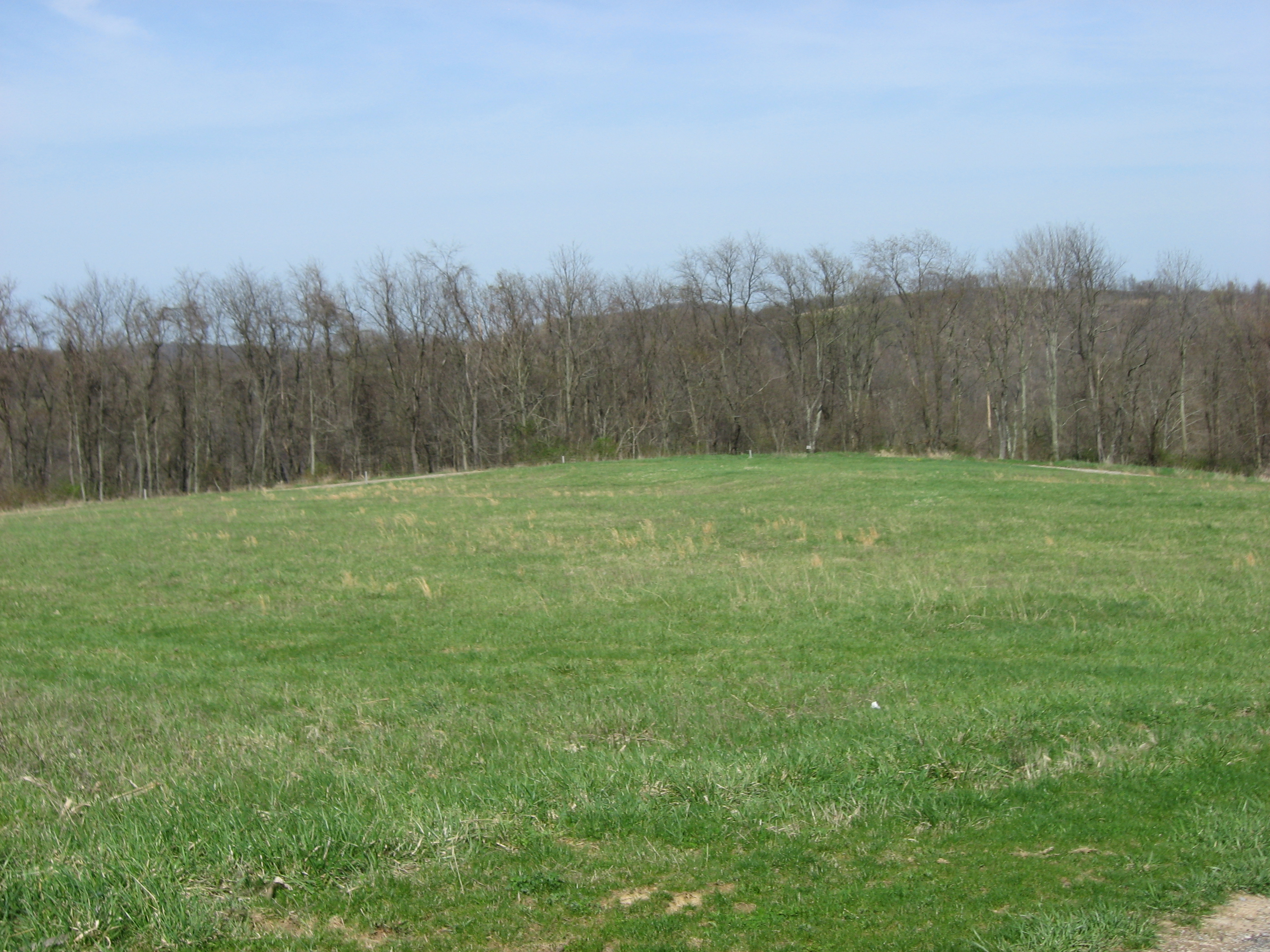
- Fields at the site

- Location within Pennsylvania Location within the United States
- Location: Off Timms Lane in Rostraver Township, Westmoreland County, Pennsylvania
- Coordinates: 40°10′27.7″N 79°46′44.4″W
- Area: 8 acres (3.2 ha)
- NRHP reference No.: 86000465
- Added to NRHP: March 20, 1986

The Household No. 1 Site is an archaeological site in Westmoreland County, Pennsylvania, United States. Located off Timms Lane in Rostraver Township, the site lies on a bluff above the Youghiogheny River.

Local archaeologists knew of the site in the early part of the twentieth century; the best records of the site are from amateur George Fisher, who studied the area from 1900 to 1950. More complete records were obtained after a 1980 investigation, which was part of the planning for the construction of baseball fields in the vicinity. Because archaeologists discovered a significant range of artifacts in the location, the fields were moved to allow for continued excavation. This investigation determined that the site was that of a Monongahela village.

Evidence of warfare dominated the findings from the Household 1 Site. Many burials were present at the site — including sixteen at the site of one house alone — and projectile points composed a much larger percentage of the total findings than did domestic tools. Furthermore, the small total number of artifacts overall shows that the site was only occupied for a short period of time, and its location on a river bluff suggests that its site was chosen for defensibility. These discoveries, like those at many other Monongahela village sites, demonstrate that the Household residents lived in a highly martial culture.

In 1986, the Household Site was added to the National Register of Historic Places for its archaeological significance.

== See also ==
- List of Native American archaeological sites on the National Register of Historic Places in Pennsylvania
