= Squirrel Hill Site =

- U.S. National Register of Historic Places
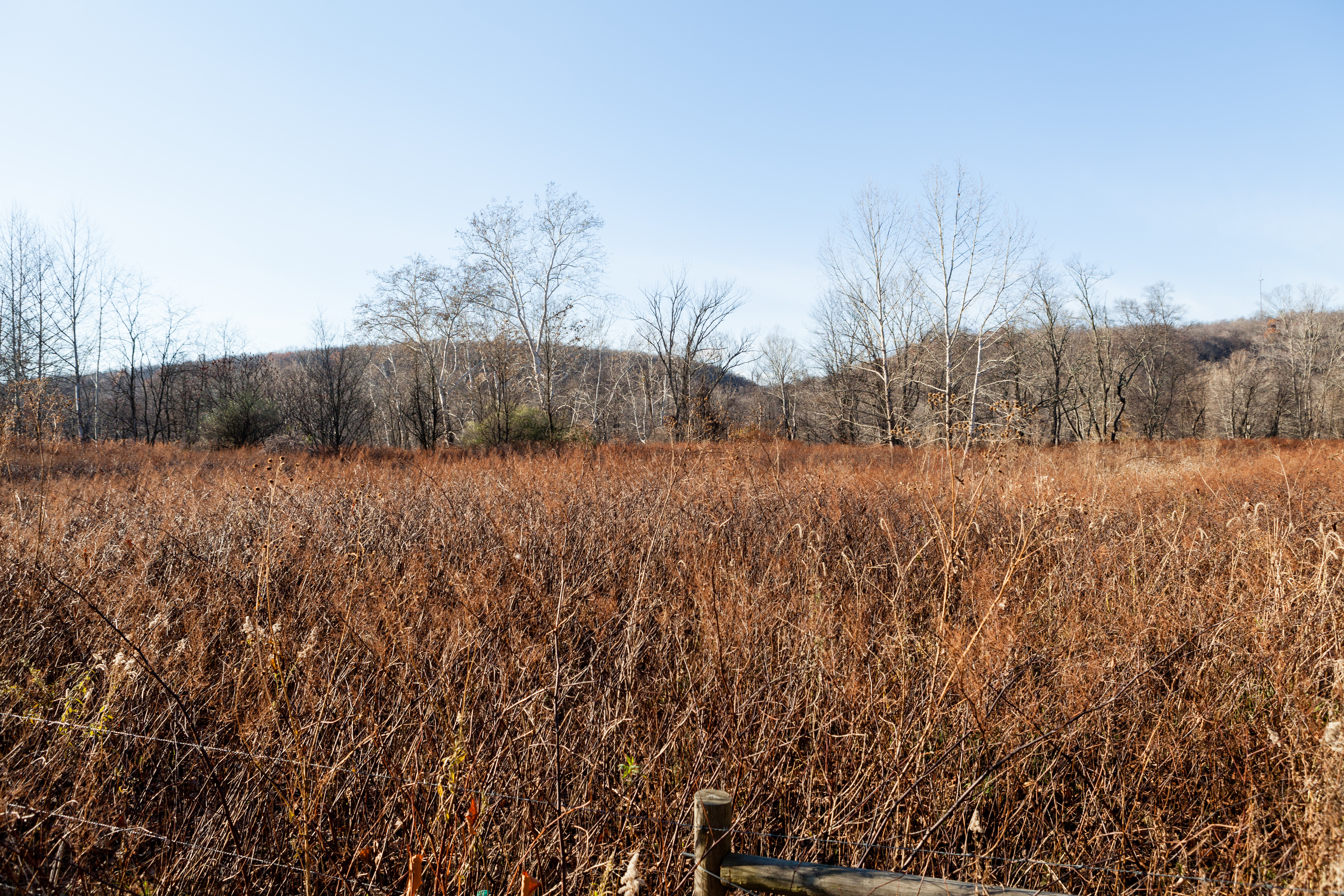
- Fields near the site

- Location within Pennsylvania Location within the United States
- Location: West of New Florence near the banks of the Conemaugh River in St. Clair Township, Westmoreland County, Pennsylvania
- Coordinates: 40°22′49.05″N 79°5′20.28″W
- Area: 1 acre (0.40 ha)
- NRHP reference No.: 80003647
- Added to NRHP: March 26, 1980

The Squirrel Hill Site is an archaeological site in northeastern Westmoreland County, Pennsylvania, United States. Located in St. Clair Township west of the borough of New Florence, it was once occupied by a large Monongahela village during the pre-contact period.

The village site lies on a bluff above the Conemaugh River northwest of Squirrel Hill, an imposing summit immediately southwest of New Florence, for which the site is named. The site has frequently been farmed since European settlement, and the disturbance resulting from plowing has brought up a large number of artifacts; consequently, locals have long been aware of the site's archaeological potential. A large area of permanently darkened soil suggests that the site was frequently the home of a dense population.

Archaeological investigation has determined that the Squirrel Hill Site is the location of one of the largest Monongahela villages in the valley of the Ohio River. Like the similar Johnston Site to the northwest, it was likely composed of a group of circular houses around a central plaza and encircled by a stockade. Objects found at the site include flint tools, pieces of pottery, and a wide range of bone fragments. The presence of human burials is expected, as the Monongahela often buried their dead within their villages.

Aside from plowing for agricultural purposes, the site has only rarely been disturbed; a dirt road crosses the property, but it is believed that the range of artifacts below the plow line has seen little damage. Few other Johnston phase Monongahela villages have been so well preserved as the Squirrel Hill Site. Accordingly, it has been seen as a prime potential site for yielding information about the poorly known late prehistoric Johnston phase.

In 1980, the Squirrel Hill Site was added to the National Register of Historic Places because of its archaeological value. One acre of the site, including land on both sides of the small dirt road, was included in the area added to the Register.

== See also ==
- List of Native American archaeological sites on the National Register of Historic Places in Pennsylvania
