= Bedford Village Archeological Site =

- Site 36BD90
- U.S. National Register of Historic Places
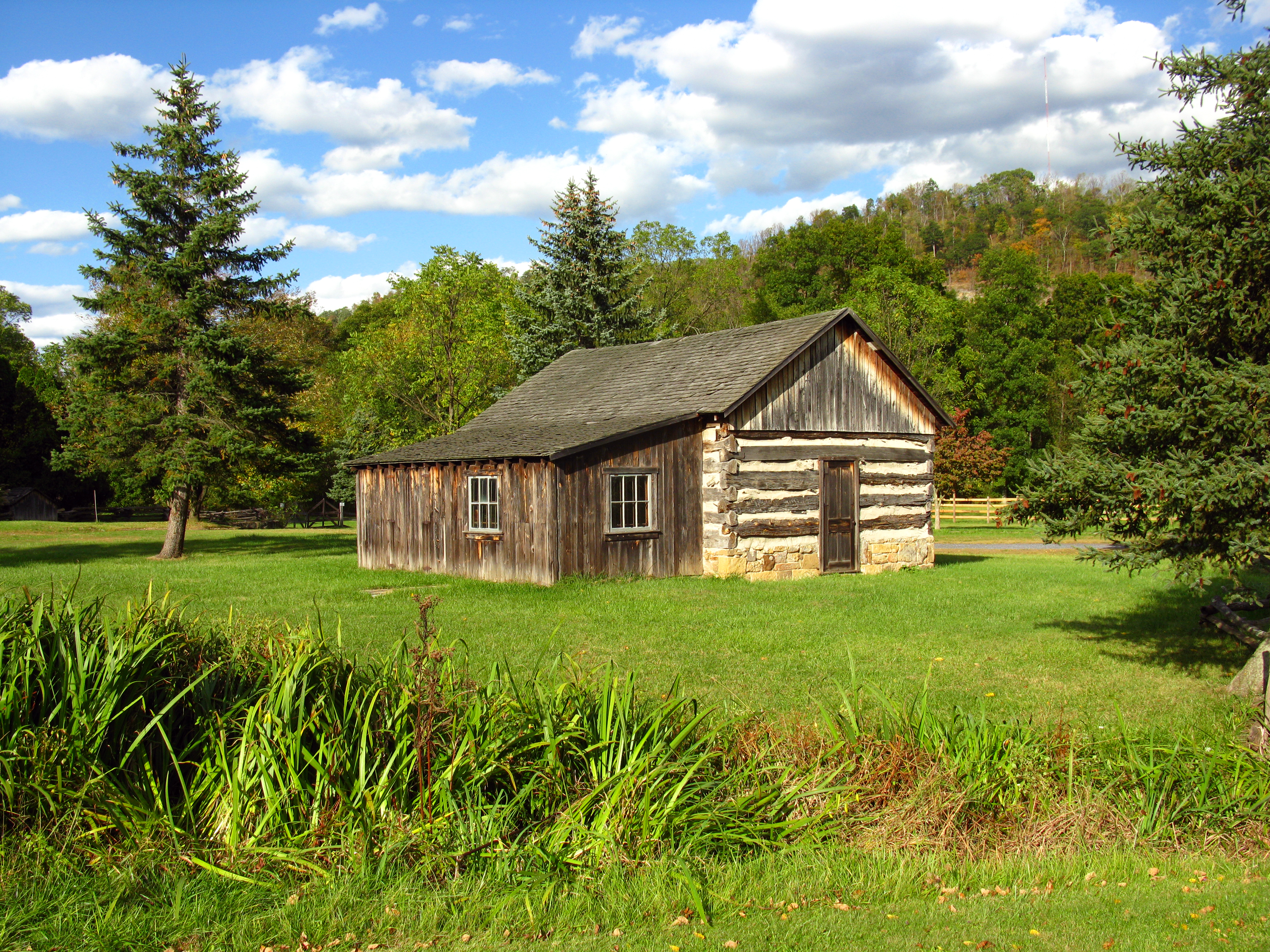
- Reconstructed Euro-American building on the site

- Location within Pennsylvania Location within the United States
- Location: On the grounds of Bedford Village in Bedford Township, Bedford County, Pennsylvania
- Coordinates: 40°2′31.2″N 78°30′38.4″W
- Area: 4.75 acres (1.92 ha)
- NRHP reference No.: 84003102
- Added to NRHP: June 4, 1984

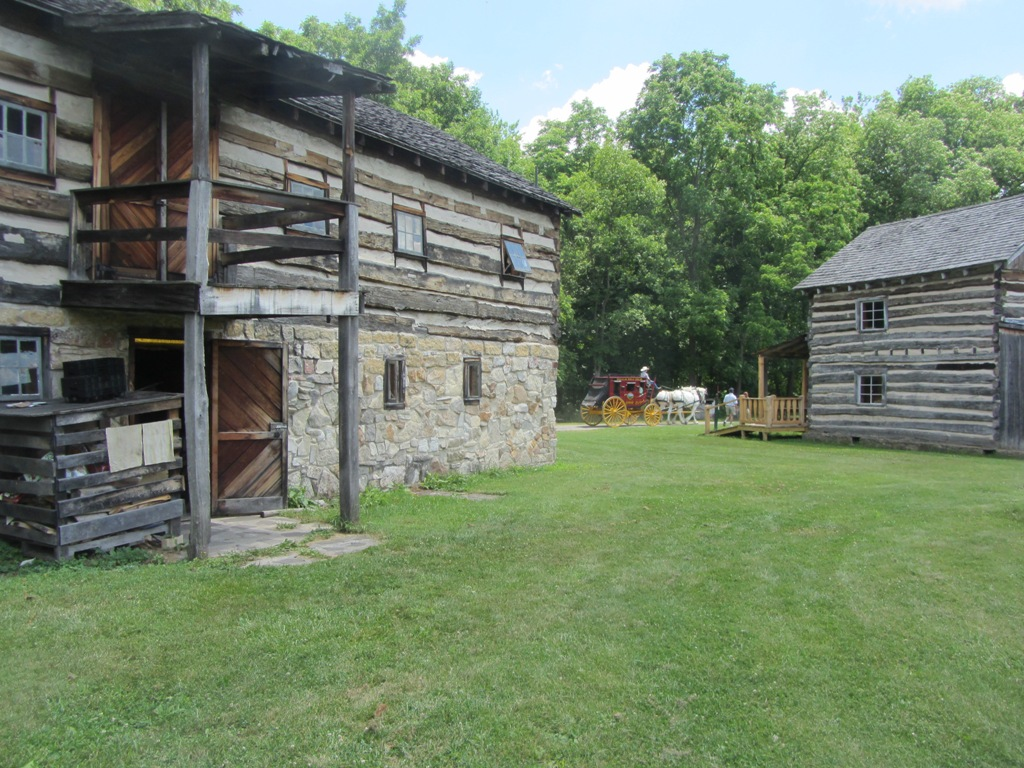
A stagecoach rides through the open-air museum.

The Bedford Village Archeological Site (36BD90) is an archaeological site in central Bedford County, Pennsylvania, United States. Located in Bedford Township north of the borough of Bedford, it was once occupied by a Monongahela culture village. Today, the site is the location of Old Bedford Village, an open-air museum, containing a variety of historic structures transported to the site from the surrounding towns of Bedford, Everett, and Rainsburg.

== Profile ==
The Monongahela village once located at the site was composed of circular houses surrounded by a stockade, an arrangement common in such villages. It was built at the highest point of a terrace along the Raystown Branch of the Juniata River, above the marshy areas of the river's floodplain. This location is atypical for the Monongahela culture, whose bearer typically settled in upland areas for defensive purposes. The villagers' houses were similar to those in other settlements; one house in the village is known to have been of a diameter of 7 metres (23 ft), like those in many other Monongahela villages. Based on archaeological evidence, it is believed that the site was occupied for a short period of time — perhaps two generations — at some point between the years 1250 and 1600.

== Historical period ==
After European settlement of the area, the hardwood forest at the site was cleared and the area was farmed for many years. Agriculture ended at the site in the mid-1970s, when the Bedford County Redevelopment Authority received a federal grant to construct a living history museum at the site. The resulting attraction, known as Old Bedford Village, was built in 1975 and 1976.

== Excavation ==
Before the creation of Old Bedford Village, the site was locally known as a source of artifacts, but no wider attention was paid to the site's archaeological potential until after the museum was established. Testing at the northern portion of the site in 1977 revealed evidence of a village from the Monongahela period and of pre-Monongahela occupation dating back to the Late Archaic period. In the summers of 1979 and 1980, Pennsylvania State University conducted much more extensive excavations at different locations in Old Bedford Village, revealing stockade trenches around much of the site.

It is believed that the site was extensively impacted by the construction of Old Bedford Village: buildings and utility lines were erected atop much of the site, and a gravel road now runs across the area. Moreover, the heavy machinery used in construction may have buried middens on the edge of the village's terrace. However, approximately three-fourths of the site remained undamaged after construction, and it is unlikely that any more areas will be affected by the museum.

== Significance ==
The Bedford Village Site represents an unusual mix of phases in Native American history in the region. As one of the most eastern Monongahela sites ever discovered, it represents the possibility of transition between the Monongahela and other peoples of central Pennsylvania. Moreover, the site's location in a floodplain has been cited as evidence for climate change in North America: it has been proposed that cooling weather around the year 1500 caused the bearer of the Monongahela culture to abandon their hilltop homes in favor of warmer weather in river valleys.

Questions of influence from other cultures are especially significant because artifacts have also been found at the site of the Shenks Ferry culture of eastern Pennsylvania. While such evidence is minimal, it suggests a short-term Shenks Ferry occupation at a date later than that of the Monongahela; among the remains of the Shenks Ferry occupation is a large midden located on top of the Monongahela stockade.

The wide range of artifacts and the high degree of preservation at the Bedford Village site led to its listing on the National Register of Historic Places in 1984.

== See also ==
- List of Native American archaeological sites on the National Register of Historic Places in Pennsylvania
