= Strickler Site =

- U.S. National Register of Historic Places
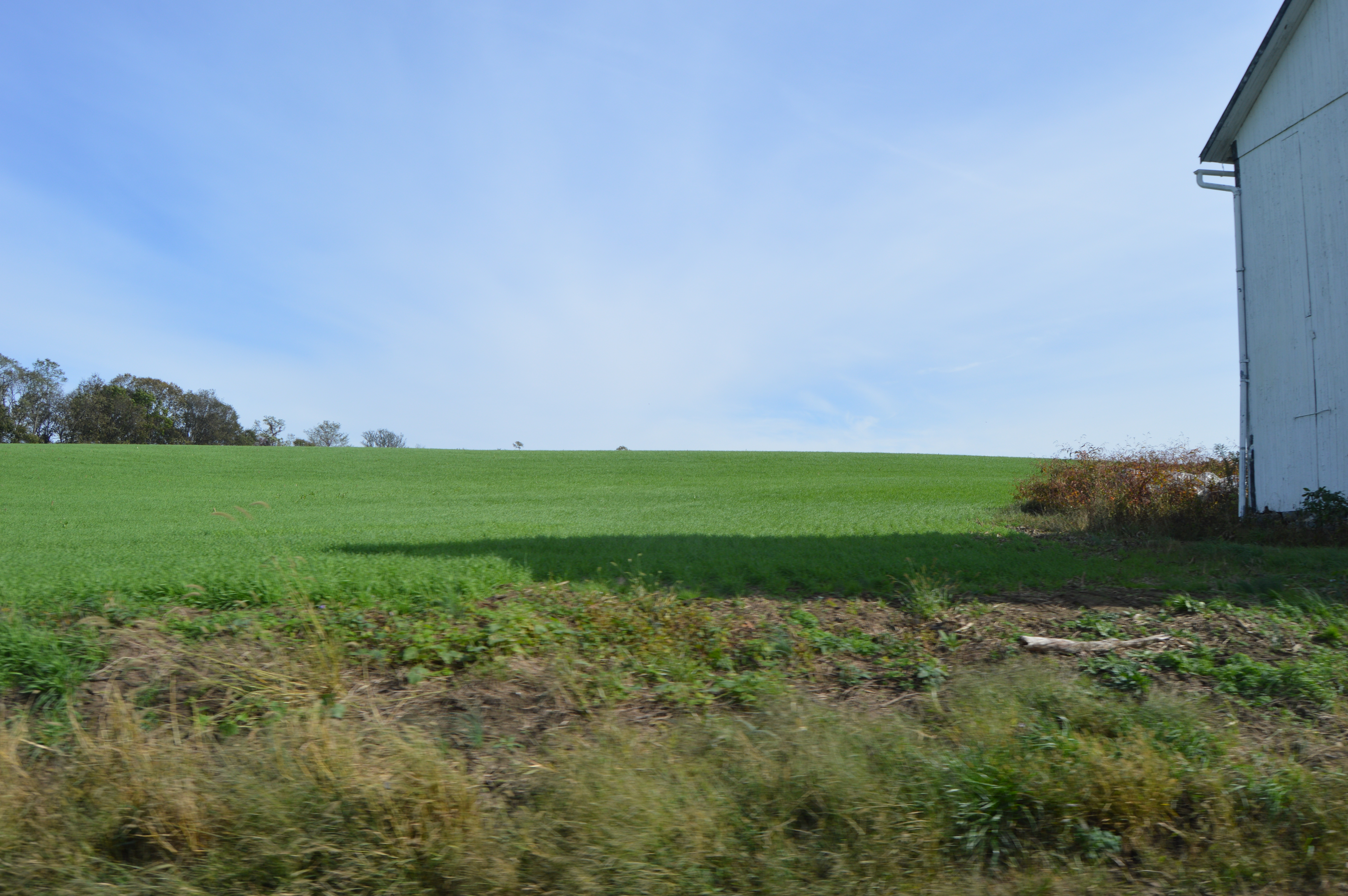
- Site overview

- Location within Pennsylvania Location within the United States
- Location: ¾ mile north of Creswell Station, and 1 mile south of Washington Boro in Manor Township, Pennsylvania
- Coordinates: 39°58′48″N 76°27′40″W
- Area: 8 acres (3.2 ha)
- NRHP reference No.: 73001638
- Added to NRHP: June 18, 1973

Strickler Site is a historic archaeological site located at Manor Township, Lancaster County, Pennsylvania. It is the site of a large, stockaded Susquehannock village dated to the 17th century. Excavations revealed nearly 13 longhouse patterns and cemeteries including hundreds of interments.

It was listed on the National Register of Historic Places in 1973.
