= Shultz-Funk Site =

- Shultz-Funk Site (36LA7 and 36LA9)
- U.S. National Register of Historic Places
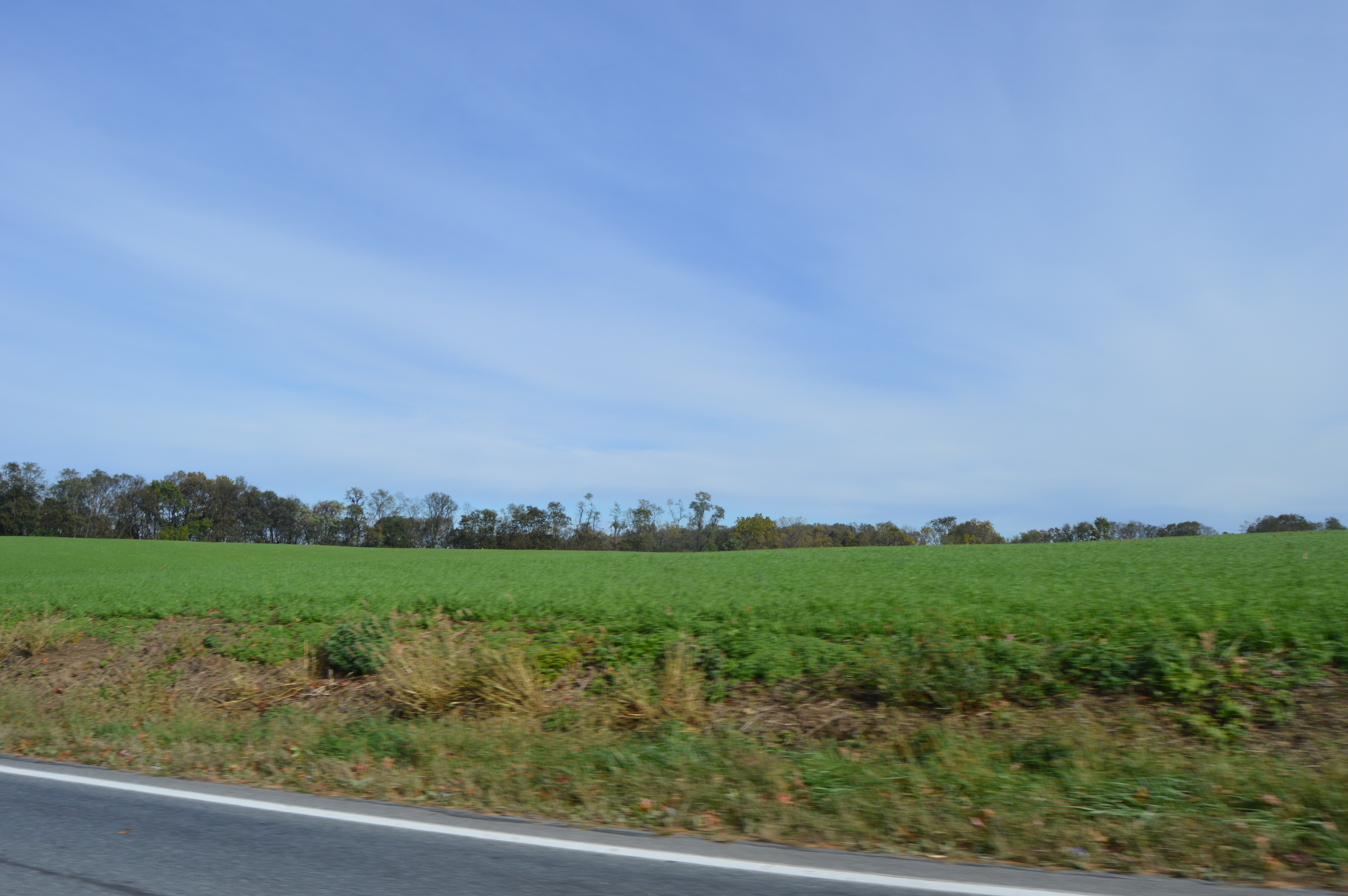
- Site overview

- Location within Pennsylvania Location within the United States
- Location: Above the Susquehanna River near Washington Borough, immediately south of Witmer's Run, Manor Township, Pennsylvania
- Coordinates: 39°58′48″N 76°27′34″W
- Area: 13 acres (5.3 ha)
- Built: 1575
- NRHP reference No.: 82003796
- Added to NRHP: March 3, 1982

The Shultz-Funk Site (36LA7 and 36LA9) is a prehistoric archaeological site that is located in Manor Township, Lancaster County, Pennsylvania.

It was listed on the National Register of Historic Places in 1982.

== History and notable features ==
This site consists of two components: the Shultz component and the Funk component. The Shultz component was first excavated in 1931 by the Pennsylvania Museum Commission. The Shultz component was the site of a large, stockaded Susquehannock period Native American village.

An extensive excavation of the Funk component in 1971, revealed three distinct Shenks Ferry villages on that site. The Shultz component is dated to 1550–1600, and the Funk component to 1500–1550.

It was listed on the National Register of Historic Places in 1982.
