= Burgholtshouse =

Historic house in Pennsylvania, United States

- U.S. National Register of Historic Places
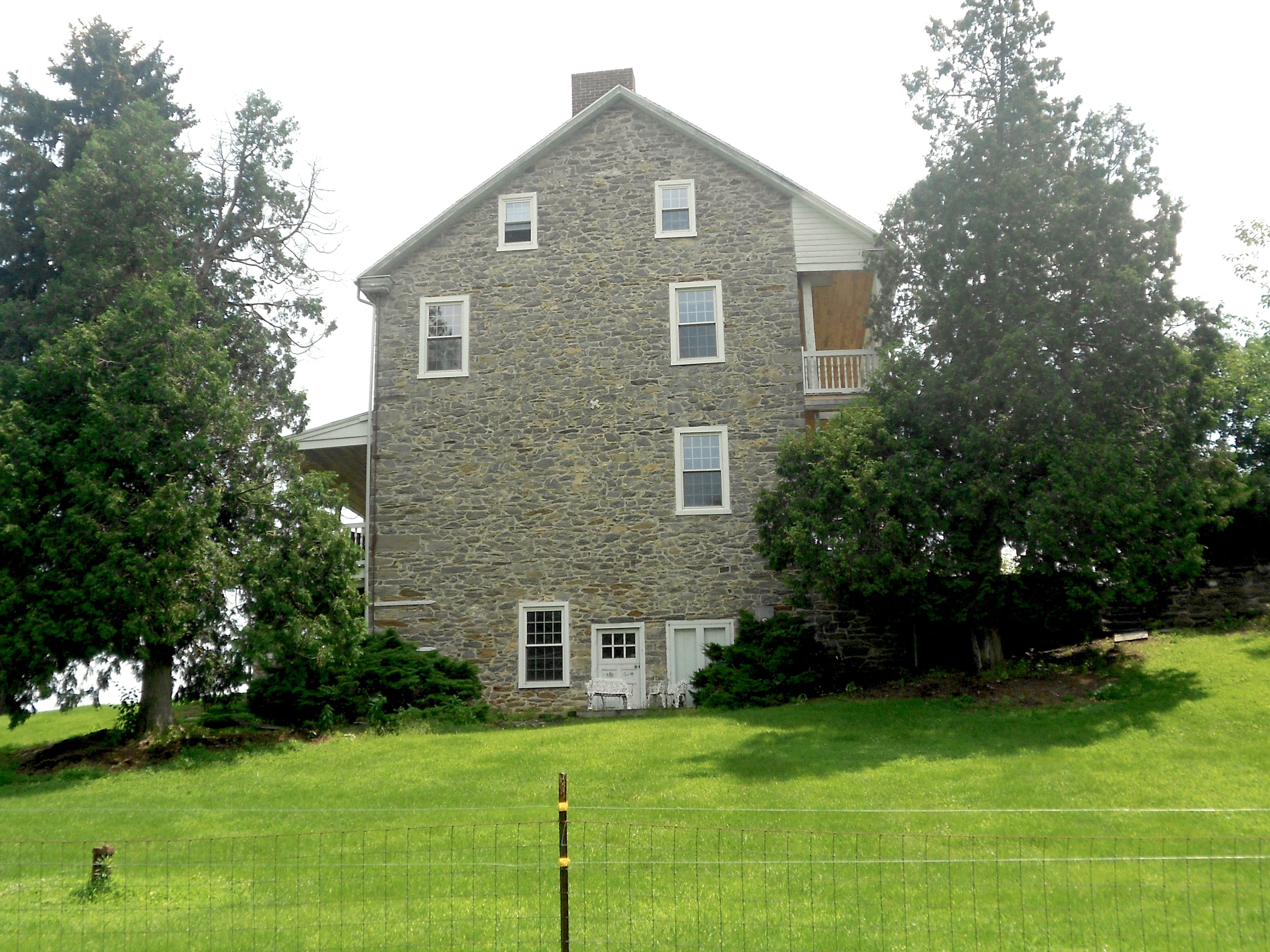
- Main house

- Location within Pennsylvania Location within the United States
- Location: South of East Prospect on Pennsylvania Route 124, Lower Windsor Township, Pennsylvania
- Coordinates: 39°57′57″N 76°30′54″W
- Area: 1 acre (0.40 ha)
- Built: c. 1820
- Architectural style: Georgian
- NRHP reference No.: 79002369
- Added to NRHP: June 22, 1979

Burgholtshouse, or Burgholts House, is a historic home located at Lower Windsor Township, York County, Pennsylvania. It was built about 1820, and is a large 2 1/2-story, Georgian-style stone dwelling. It is five bays wide and has a gable roof. It features a second story front porch.

It was added to the National Register of Historic Places in 1979.

== Gallery ==
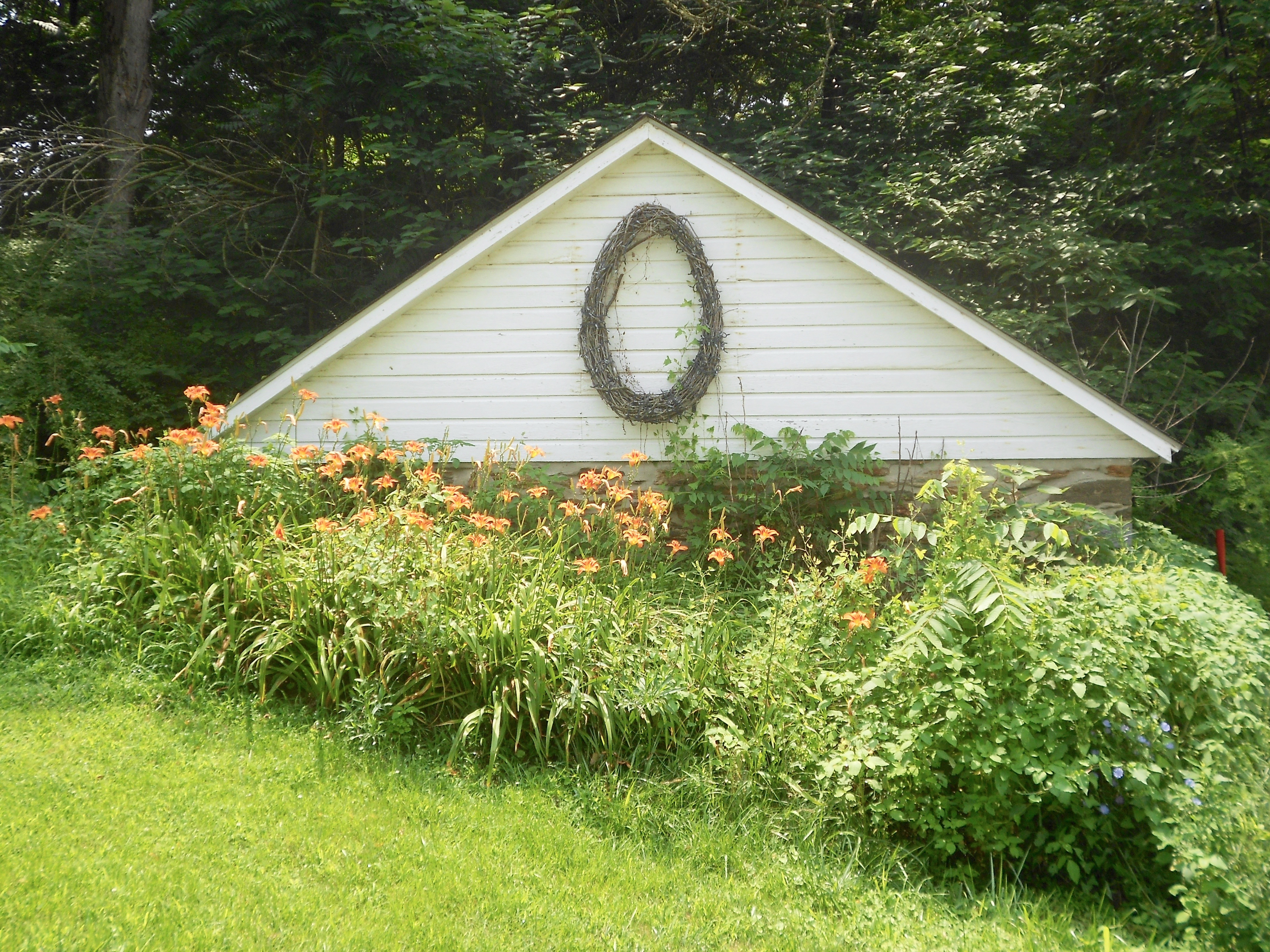
Springhouse
