= Canfield Island Site =

- Archeological Site 36 LY 37
- U.S. National Register of Historic Places
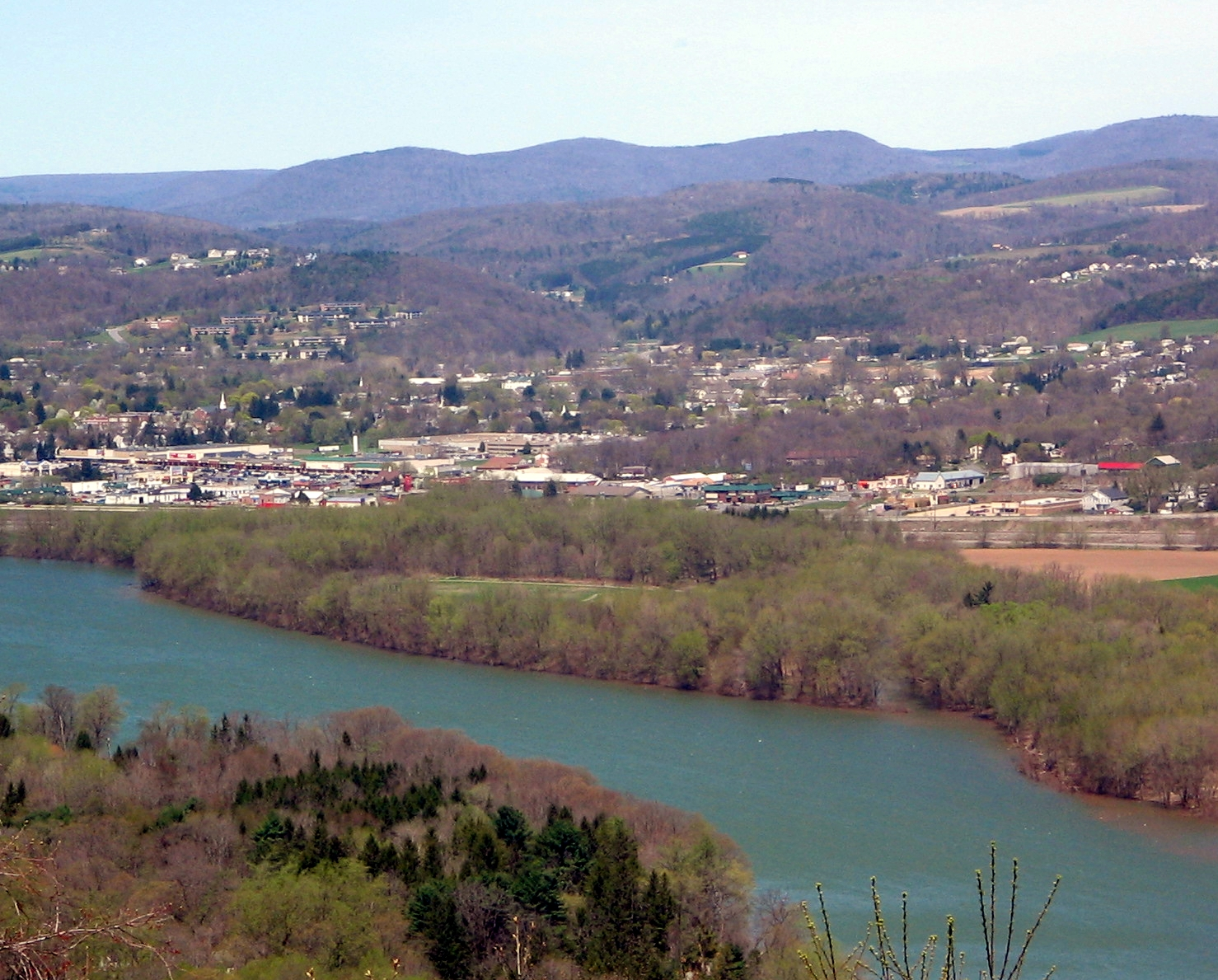
- Canfield Island and the West Branch Susquehanna River, as seen from Bald Eagle Mountain

- Location within Pennsylvania Location within the United States
- Location: Canfield Island in the West Branch Susquehanna River, near Williamsport, Pennsylvania
- Coordinates: 41°14′32″N 76°57′11″W
- Area: 21 acres (8.5 ha)
- NRHP reference No.: 82003799
- Added to NRHP: April 14, 1982

The Canfield Island Site, also known as Archeological Site 36LY37, is an archaeological site in Lycoming County, Pennsylvania, United States. Located on Canfield Island in the West Branch Susquehanna River, the site lies east of the city of Williamsport in Loyalsock Township. It is believed to have been inhabited by prehistoric Native Americans for thousands of years, with the oldest discoveries dating back to more than one millennium before Christ.

== Geology ==
Canfield Island is an artificial island formed by the digging of a canal near the side of the West Branch Susquehanna in the early twentieth century; today, this canal forms the northern half of the island's shoreline, and the West Branch forms the southern half. Much of the island has been cultivated during the historical period, but forests today cover a significant portion of the island. It has frequently received deposits from the West Branch. The island has a total area of 21 acres (8.5 ha).

== Archaeological investigation ==
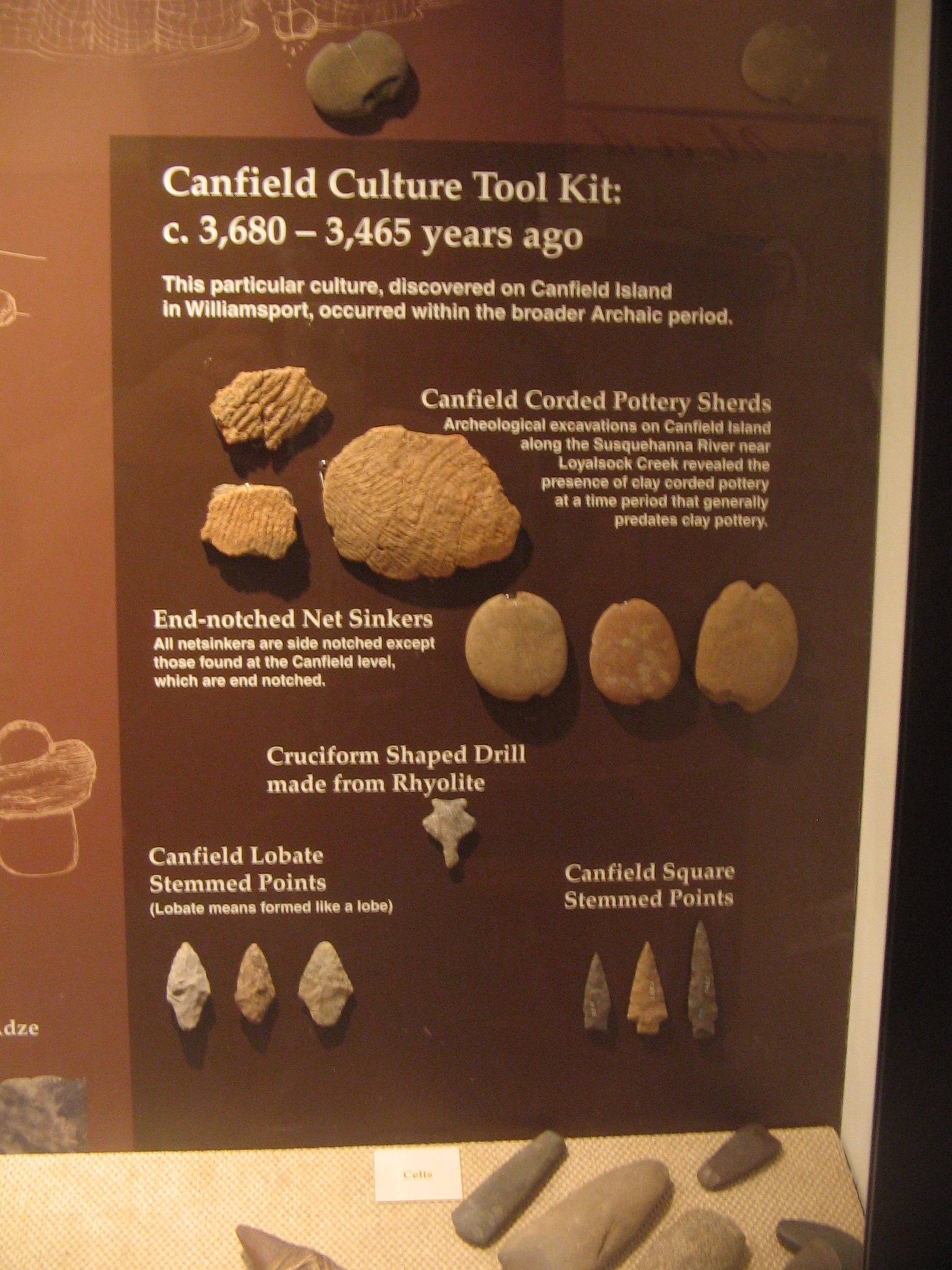
Artifacts found at the site

The island was first revealed to be a potential archaeological site as a result of a preliminary investigation performed by an exploratory group of members of the Society for Pennsylvania Archaeology who first visited the island in 1958. Beginning in 1960 and continuing periodically through 1980, a series of excavations yielded artifacts to a depth of 15 metres (49 ft) below the surface, and surface artifacts were extant throughout the island. Since 1980, occasional investigations have continued at the site; a team from Lycoming College in Williamsport carried out an excavation on the island in 2003.

Excavations yielded discoveries from a set of phases that was more complete than could be found at most comparable Pennsylvania sites. While ceramics are rare at the site, the presence of charcoal from a wide range of phases has provided a basis for dating charcoal found at many other sites in the state. Another significant discovery was a set of massive hearths amid large numbers of fishing nets, which has led to the proposal that Canfield Island was a major fishery.

== Conclusions ==
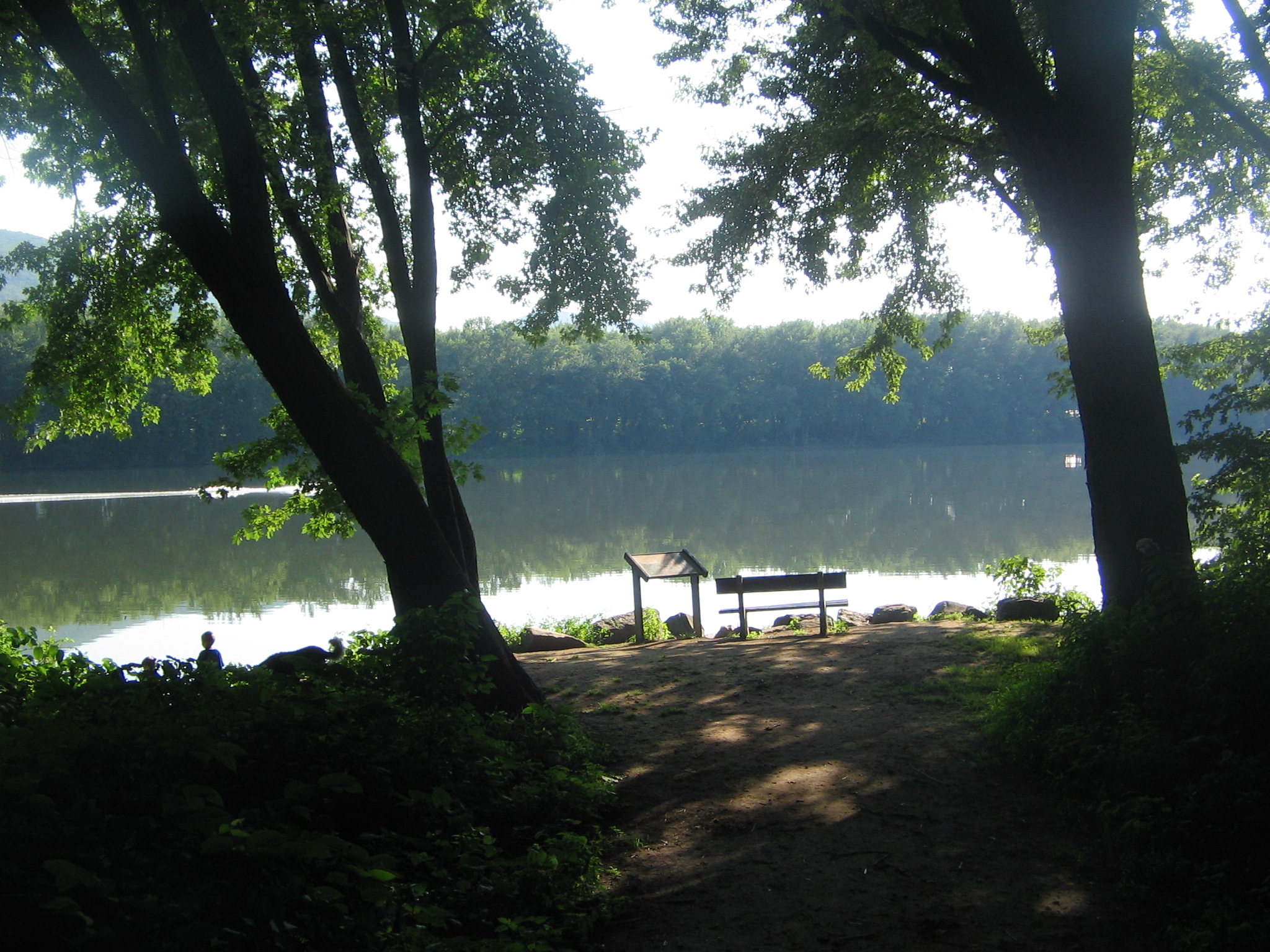
Interpretive sign and park bench along the West Branch Susquehanna River in the park

Archaeological investigations have concluded that Canfield Island was inhabited during the Late Archaic period (approximately 3,000 years BP) and a fragment found at the lowest point of investigation, while it cannot be dated conclusively, may have originated in the Early Archaic period. Various phases of the Woodland period appear at the site, and evidence exists of occupation by the Susquehannock, who still inhabited eastern Pennsylvania after the arrival of Europeans in the region.

== Recognition ==
In 1982, Canfield Island was listed on the National Register of Historic Places in recognition of the amount of information it had yielded and because of its potential to yield even more information. The site is today part of Riverfront Park, a Loyalsock Township park that includes an archaeology-themed trail on the island. Since 2003, local Native Americans have held an annual pow-wow on the island.

== See also ==
- List of Native American archaeological sites on the National Register of Historic Places in Pennsylvania
