= Roberts Farm Site (36LA1) =

- U.S. National Register of Historic Places
- Location within Pennsylvania Location within the United States
- Location: On a knoll above the Conestoga River, just before its confluence with the Susquehanna River, Manor Township, Pennsylvania
- Coordinates: 39°56′42.36″N 76°22′26.861″W
- Area: 7.5 acres (3.0 ha)
- NRHP reference No.: 86000830
- Added to NRHP: April 3, 1986

The Roberts Farm Site (36LA1) is a historic, American archaeological site that is located above the Conestoga River in Manor Township in Lancaster County, Pennsylvania.

It was listed on the National Register of Historic Places in 1986.

== History and architectural features ==
This archaeological site underwent excavation between 1931 and 1932 and again in 1971 by the Pennsylvania Historical and Museum Commission. The excavations identified the presence of a substantial, fortified Susquehannock Indian village and cemetery from the Late Woodland/Protohistoric period. Settlement of the area occurred from the Late Archaic period through roughly 1650.

This site was listed on the National Register of Historic Places in 1986.
