= Dritt Mansion =

Historic house in Pennsylvania, United States

- U.S. National Register of Historic Places
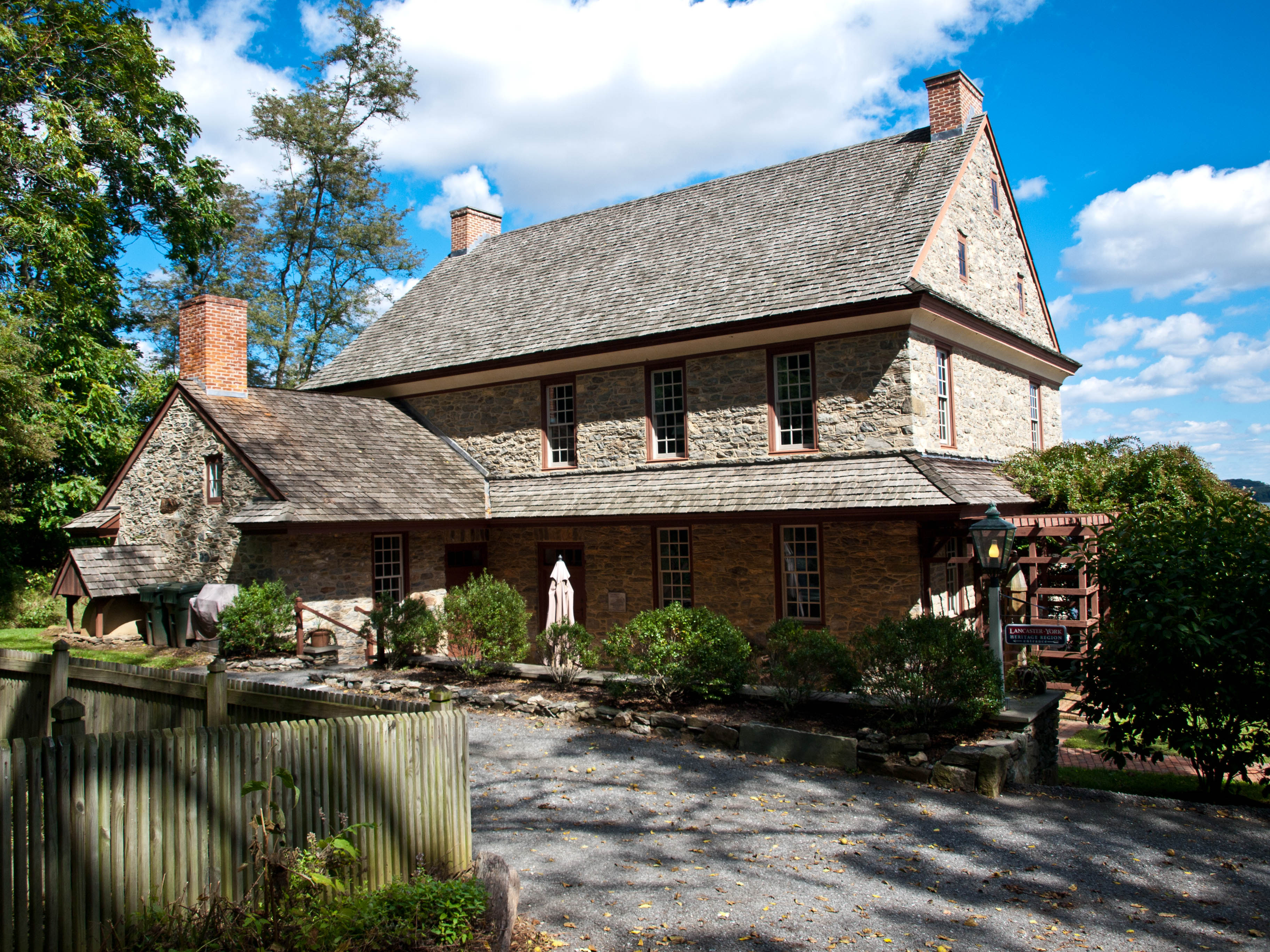

- Location within Pennsylvania Location within the United States
- Location: 3.5 miles (5.6 km) south of Wrightsville on Pennsylvania Route 624, Lower Windsor Township, Pennsylvania
- Coordinates: 39°58′39″N 76°29′48″W
- Area: 0.4 acres (0.16 ha)
- Built: c. 1758
- Architectural style: Colonial
- NRHP reference No.: 77001206
- Added to NRHP: August 16, 1977

Dritt Mansion, named after its longest occupants, and also called Pleasant Garden, and current home to the Zimmerman Center for Heritage, is a historic home located at Lower Windsor Township, York County, Pennsylvania. It was built about 1758, and is a 2 1/2-story, fieldstone dwelling. It measures 50 feet (15.2 m) long and 40 (12.2 m) feet wide, with a cedar-shingled gable roof. The house has remained virtually unchanged since its construction. The land the house is on was first granted by Lord Baltimore to Thomas Cresap in 1729, who operated a ferry here and claimed the area for Maryland. Cresap was arrested in 1736 and driven away after skirmishes known as "Cresap's War"—a dispute finally resolved in 1784 when the Mason–Dixon line was established. Today the home plays host to Heritage Area offices and programs and the Visions of the Susquehanna River Art Collection.

It was added to the National Register of Historic Places in 1977.
