= Murry Site =

- U.S. National Register of Historic Places
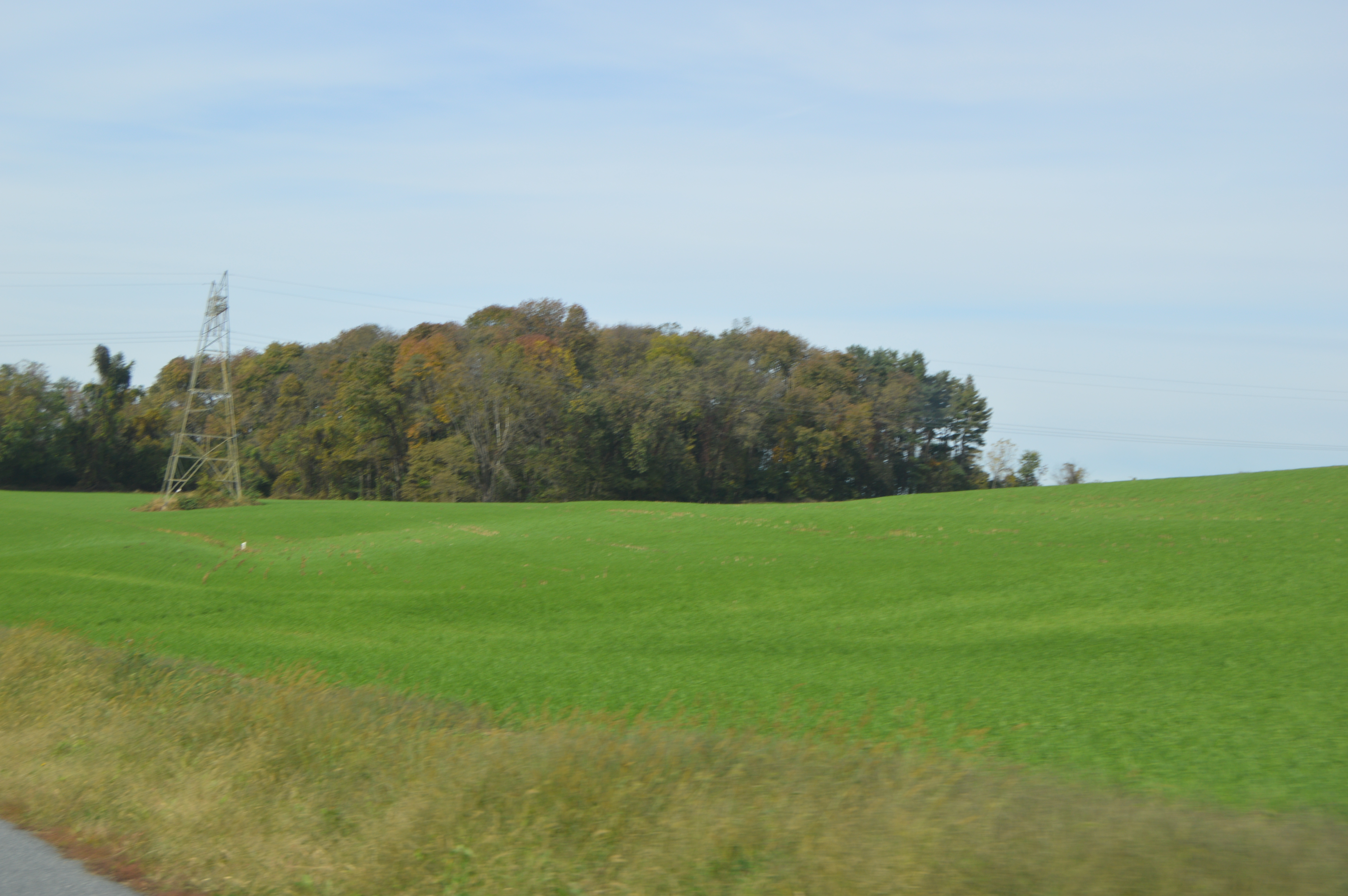
- Fields at the site

- Location within Pennsylvania Location within the United States
- Location: 2 miles (3.2 km) south of Washington Boro in Manor Township, Pennsylvania
- Coordinates: 39°58′44.4″N 76°27′10.8″W
- Area: 4.5 acres (1.8 ha)
- Built: 1550
- NRHP reference No.: 80003540
- Added to NRHP: December 10, 1980

The Murry Site is a prehistoric archaeological site located in Manor Township, Lancaster County, Pennsylvania. It is the site of a large, stockaded Shenks Ferry village. It was excavated in 1967, and identified as having been inhabited for 10 years, sometime between 1450 and 1550. They identified 46 burials.

It was listed on the National Register of Historic Places in 1980.
