= Central Manor, Pennsylvania =

Unincorporated community in Pennsylvania, US

- Unincorporated community
- Location within Pennsylvania Location within the United States
- Coordinates: 39°59′57″N 76°25′34″W
- Country: United States
- State: Pennsylvania
- County: Lancaster
- Township: Manor
- Elevation: 358 ft (109 m)
- Time zone: UTC-5 (Eastern (EST))
  - Summer (DST): UTC-4 (EDT)
- Area code: 717
- GNIS feature ID: 1171490

Central Manor is an unincorporated community in Manor Township in Lancaster County, Pennsylvania, United States. Central Manor is located at the intersection of Pennsylvania Route 999 and Central Manor Road.
