= Frey-Haverstick Site =

- Frey-Haverstick Site (36LA6)
- U.S. National Register of Historic Places
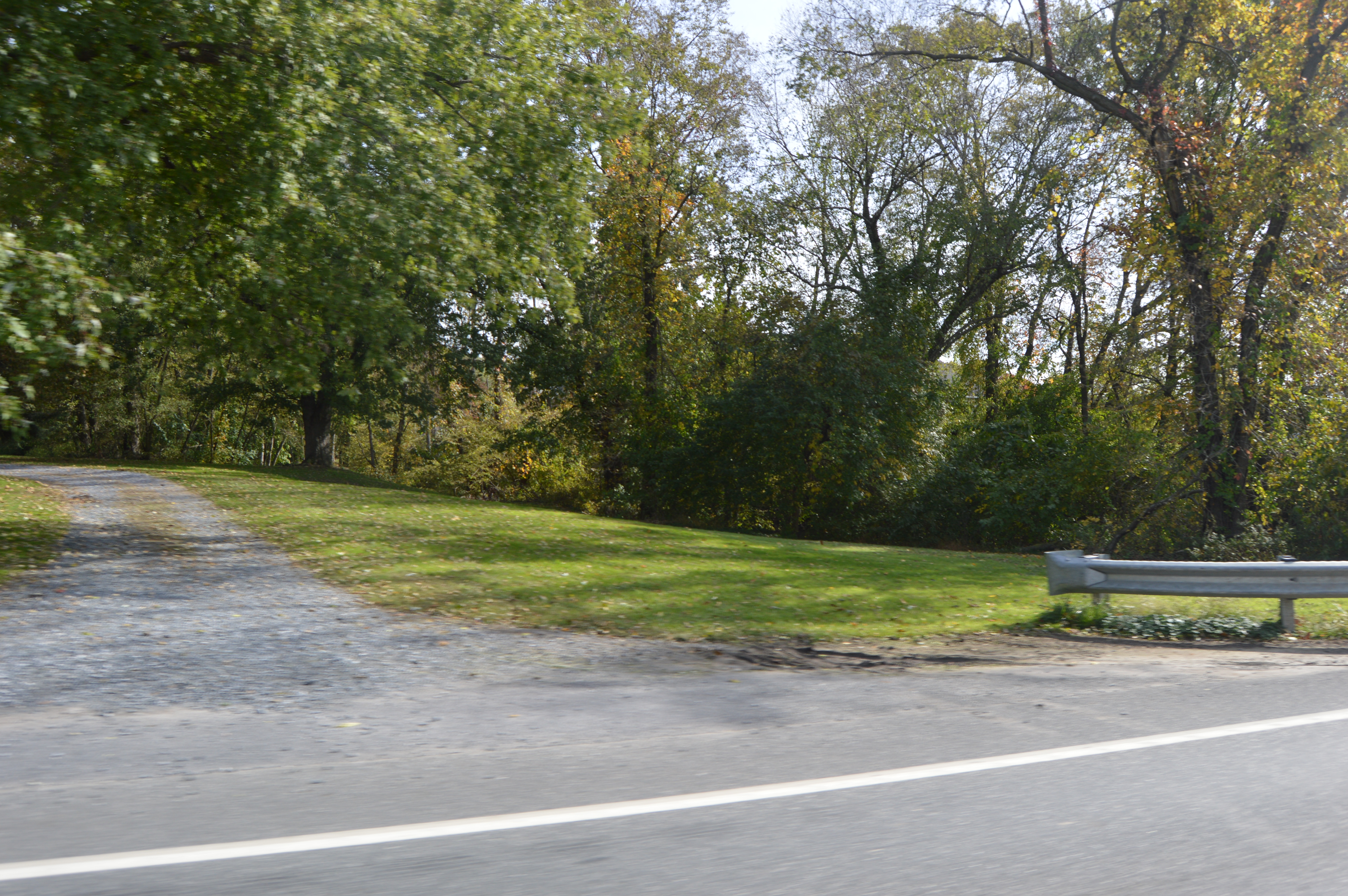
- Land along the stream

- Location within Pennsylvania Location within the United States
- Location: Eastern side of the Susquehanna River, north of Staman's Run, Washington Boro, Manor Township, Pennsylvania
- Coordinates: 39°59′42″N 76°28′13.8″W
- Area: 10.3 acres (4.2 ha)
- NRHP reference No.: 86000819
- Added to NRHP: January 15, 1986

The Frey-Haverstick Site (36LA6) is a prehistoric and historic archaeological site located in Manor Township, Lancaster County, Pennsylvania. The site was excavated in 1931, 1971, and 1975 by the Pennsylvania Historical and Museum Commission. Artifacts on the site were discovered as early as 1873, and included a helmet of Swedish origin dated to the reign of King Gustavus II Adolphus (1611–1632). The site features a Susquehannock cemetery, a Middle Woodland habitation site, and a Shenks Ferry village. Various artifact date activities on the site between 3500 BC. and 1650 AD.

It was listed on the National Register of Historic Places in 1986.
