= Lower Windsor Township, Pennsylvania =

Township in Pennsylvania, US

Coordinates: 39°57′00″N 76°29′58″W

- Township
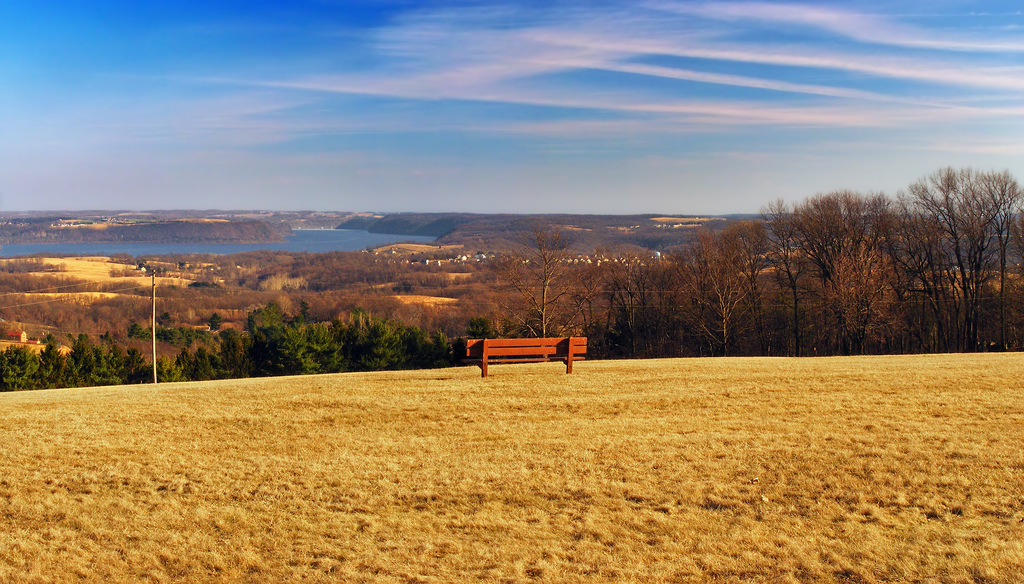
- Samuel S. Lewis State Park

- Location in York County and the state of Pennsylvania.
- Country: United States
- State: Pennsylvania
- County: York
- Settled: 1722
- Incorporated: 1838

Government
  - Type: Board of Supervisors

Area
  - Total: 25.02 sq mi (64.79 km^{2})
  - Land: 25.02 sq mi (64.79 km^{2})
  - Water: 0 sq mi (0.00 km^{2})

Population (2020)
  - Total: 7,519 ▲
  - Estimate (2023): 7,577
  - Density: 299.1/sq mi (115.49/km^{2})
- Time zone: UTC-5 (Eastern (EST))
  - Summer (DST): UTC-4 (EDT)
- Area code: 717
- FIPS code: 42-133-45152
- Website: https://www.lowerwindsor.com/

Historical population
Census	Pop.	Note	%±
1850	1,923		—
1860	2,162		12.4%
1870	2,429		12.3%
1880	2,538		4.5%
1890	2,764		8.9%
1900	2,649		−4.2%
1910	2,607		−1.6%
1920	2,053		−21.3%
1930	2,209		7.6%
1940	2,724		23.3%
1950	2,934		7.7%
1960	3,424		16.7%
1970	3,879		13.3%
1980	5,977		54.1%
1990	7,051		18.0%
2000	7,405		5.0%
2010	7,382		−0.3%
2020	7,519		1.9%
2023 (est.)	7,577		0.8%
U.S. Decennial Census

Lower Windsor Township is a township in York County, Pennsylvania, United States. The population was 7,519 at the 2020 census. Samuel S. Lewis State Park overlooks the Susquehanna River in the eastern part of the township.

== History ==
The Oscar Leibhart Site (36YO9), Byrd Leibhart Site (36YO170), Dritt Mansion, and Burgholtshouse are listed on the National Register of Historic Places.

== Geography ==
According to the United States Census Bureau, the township has a total area of 25.1 square miles (64.9 km^{2}), all land. The township surrounds the boroughs of Yorkana and East Prospect.

== Demographics ==
As of the census of 2000, there were 7,405 people, 2,791 households, and 2,121 families living in the township. The population density was 295.4 inhabitants per square mile (114.1/km^{2}). There were 3,057 housing units at an average density of 121.9 per square mile (47.1/km^{2}). The racial makeup of the township was 98.58% White, 0.15% African American, 0.11% Native American, 0.12% Asian, 0.39% from other races, and 0.65% from two or more races. Hispanic or Latino of any race were 1.13% of the population.

There were 2,791 households, out of which 35.9% had children under the age of 18 living with them, 63.6% were married couples living together, 6.8% had a female householder with no husband present, and 24.0% were non-families. 18.6% of all households were made up of individuals, and 6.6% had someone living alone who was 65 years of age or older. The average household size was 2.65 and the average family size was 3.00.

In the township the population was spread out, with 26.0% under the age of 18, 6.8% from 18 to 24, 32.6% from 25 to 44, 24.6% from 45 to 64, and 10.0% who were 65 years of age or older. The median age was 37 years. For every 100 females, there were 100.3 males. For every 100 females age 18 and over, there were 99.2 males.

The median income for a household in the township was $45,413, and the median income for a family was $48,430. Males had a median income of $35,779 versus $23,801 for females. The per capita income for the township was $18,602. About 6.0% of families and 7.3% of the population were below the poverty line, including 7.0% of those under age 18 and 8.6% of those age 65 or over.

== Education ==
Lower Windsor Township is served by the Eastern York School District.
