= Conestoga Town =

- U.S. National Register of Historic Places
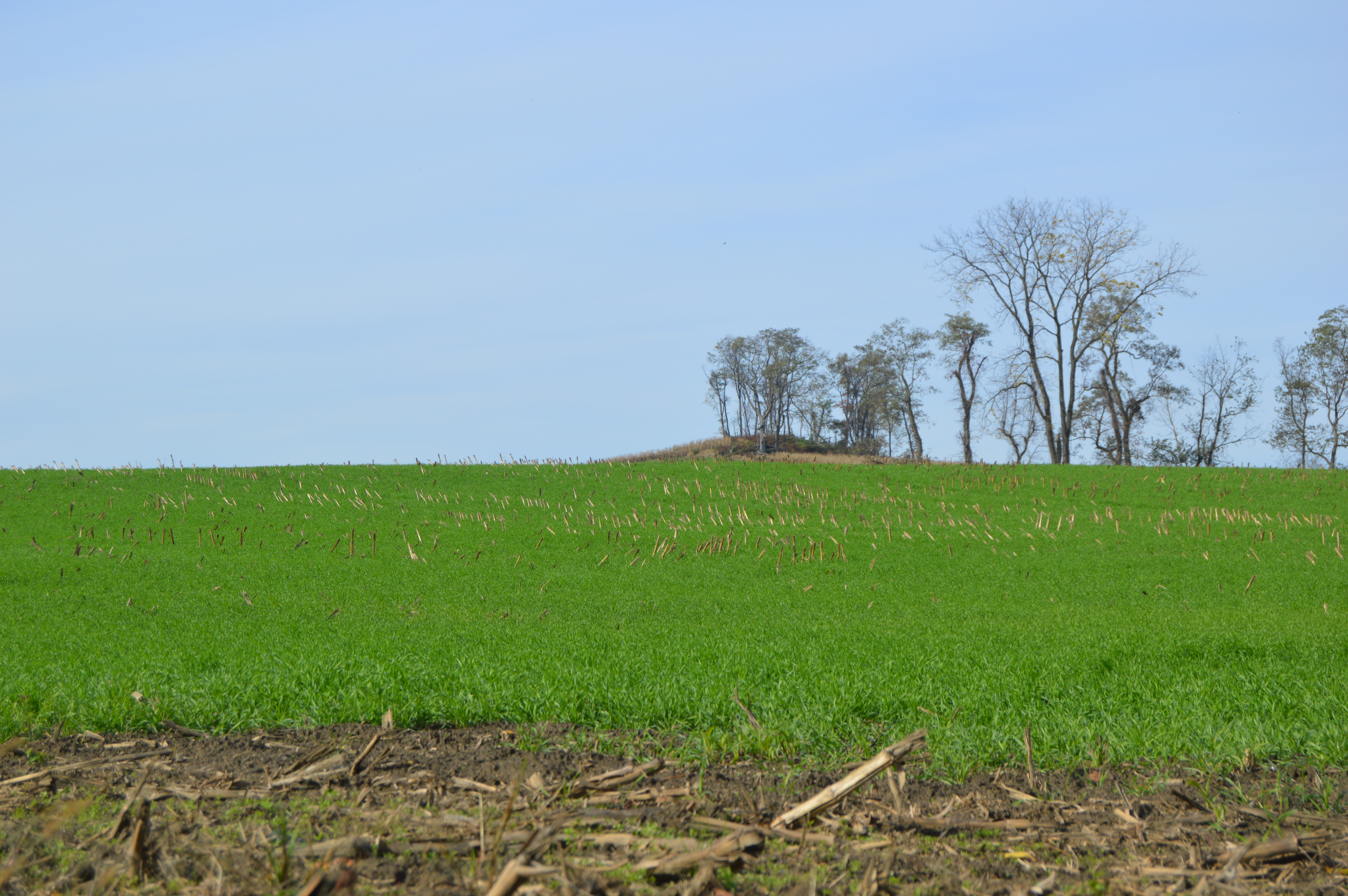
- Overview from Safe Harbor Road

- Location within Pennsylvania Location within the United States
- Location: Junction of Safe Harbor and Indian Marker Roads, Manor Township, Pennsylvania
- Coordinates: 39°57′35.424″N 76°24′1.44″W
- Area: 5 acres (2.0 ha)
- Built: c. 1690
- NRHP reference No.: 73001636
- Added to NRHP: June 18, 1973

Conestoga Town is an historic archaeological site memorializing the Native American tribal village which stood on the site from the late 17th into the mid-18th-century; it is located at what is now Manor Township in Lancaster County, Pennsylvania. The town is a settlement at the southern end of the once vast range of the Susquehannock nation or Conestoga Indian nation, which once extended from the northern reaches of Maryland to the along the southern width of southern New York State and southern Catskills where a related people, the Five Nations of the Iroquois Confederacy held western settlement in check for 200 years. Their territory encompassed the entire drainage basin of the Susquehanna River which shares the tribe's root name and extended to the drainage divides of the flanking mountains both to the East to the Delaware nation and to the West to Shawnee lands. The town is the earliest established known surviving settlement of the tribe, and it is known that William Penn himself visited to negotiate with the tribal leaders. The site is also one known to be among the last occupied of the Susquehannock town sites in Pennsylvania as they faded into obscurity.

Throughout the majority of the seventeenth century, the Susquehannock-Conestoga were a strong fierce Indian people who also came to be known locally as the Conestogas (meaning "Buried Pole Place" or "town," much like "Can-ah Da" means "Buried Pole Place" or "town" in other Iroquois languages). Excavations revealed log-cabin like structures and cemeteries. The village was occupied from the 1690s to about 1725—well after the collapse of the Susquehannock nation in the 1670s, after which the village moved to different sites within a 414-acre tract. It was an important meeting place between various Native American tribes and Pennsylvania government officials, including William Penn.

Of the early neighbors of Conestoga we find that thirty eight of them were signers of the petition in 1728 to create the county of Lancaster, out of 188 signers from the entire county. The Jones the Hendrickes, Postlethwaites, Gales, Swifts, Linvills, Worleys, Pattersons, McCurrys, Bakers, Middletons, and Wilkinses, Hughs, Willises, Mitchells, Brians, Powells, and Ludford representing the English. Stoneman, Steh, man, Ferr, Barr, Punk, Lemon, Hans, packer, Miller and others representing the German-Swiss. All signed it.

The Court records in Chester county as to Conestoga township in those days show that both the English and the Swiss took part in public affairs.

The beginning of the little group of houses called Conestoga town started in 1715 by James Hendricks, who in that year secured the right to 1,166 acres of land, reaching from Rock Hill up the Conestoga River, eight miles— almost to Wabank and east along and south of "Stehman's run," nearly to New Danville Old Mennonite Church. This settlement differed from the Pequea settlement to the east. While the Pequea colony, at Willow Street, were all Swiss Mennonites, the settlement along the Conestoga consisted of a Scotch-Irish and English core, bordering on both sides of that river, surrounded by scores of German-Swiss on all sides.

In 1763, the Paxton Boys raided a later Conestoga Town village.

It was listed on the National Register of Historic Places in 1973.

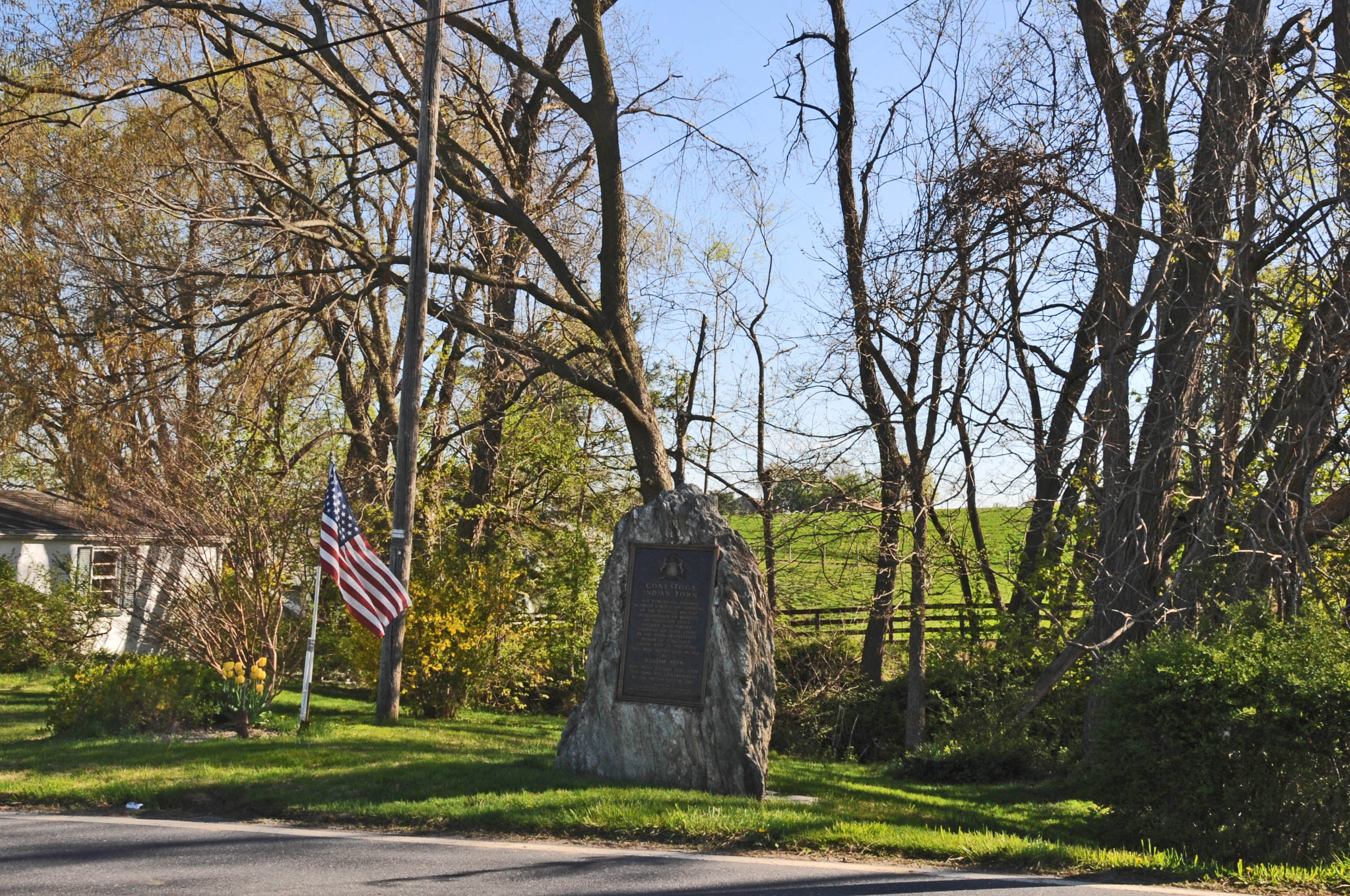
Marker on the roadside

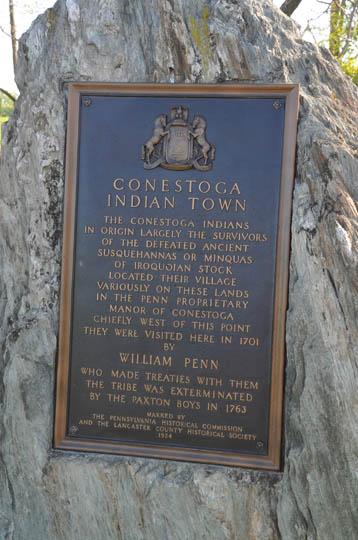
Plaque

== See also ==
Conestoga, Pennsylvania
