= Byrd Leibhart Site =

- Byrd Leibhart Site (36YO170)
- U.S. National Register of Historic Places
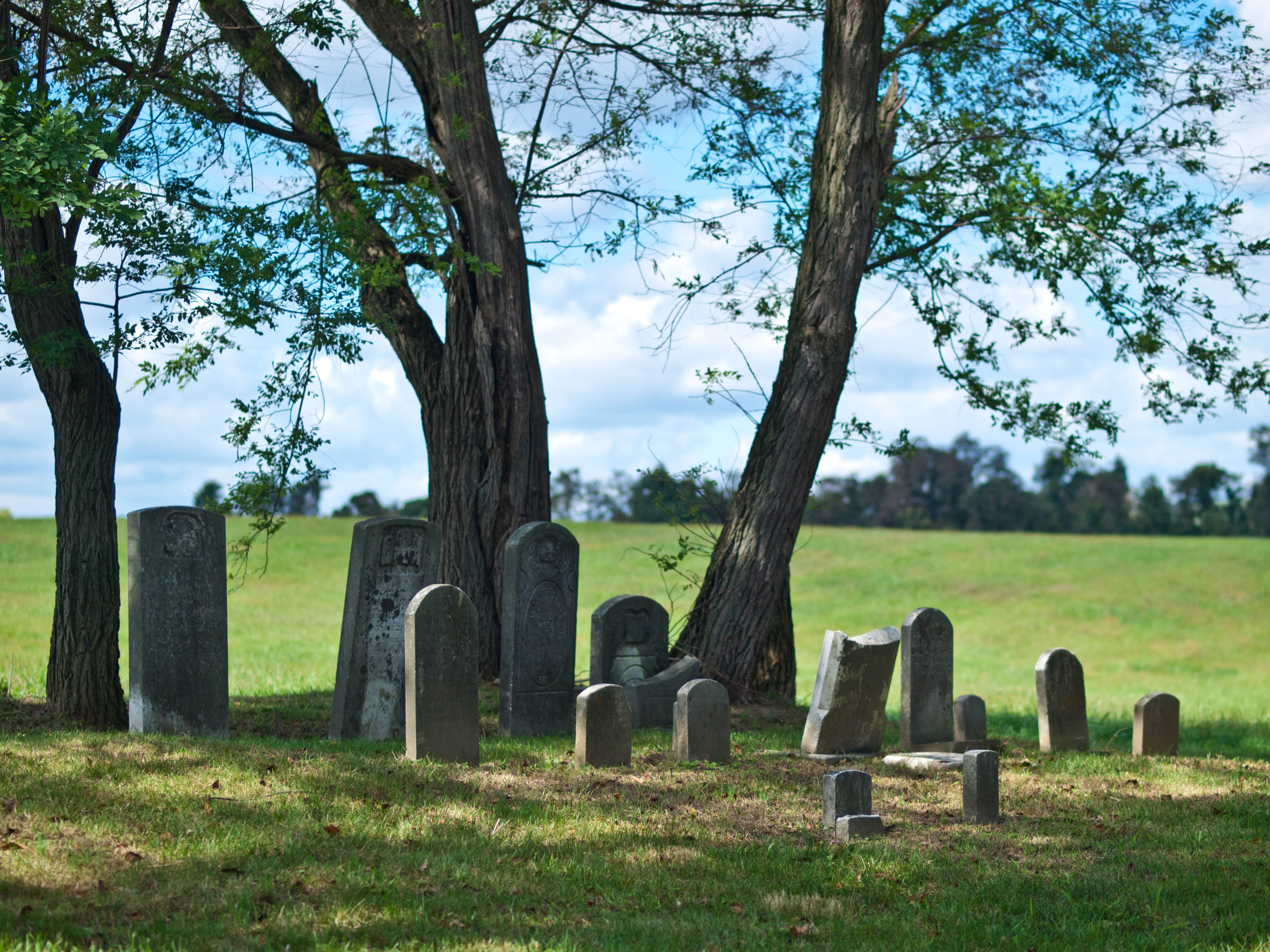
- Gravestones at Byrd Leibhart

- Location within Pennsylvania Location within the United States
- Location: Native Lands County Park, Lower Windsor Township, York County, Pennsylvania
- Coordinates: 39°58′41.4″N 76°29′54″W
- Area: 11 acres (4.5 ha)
- NRHP reference No.: 84003955
- Added to NRHP: January 14, 2009

The Byrd Leibhart Site, designated 36 YO 170 is a historic archaeological site located in Native Lands County Park at Lower Windsor Township, York County, Pennsylvania. It was the site of a late 17th-century fortified settlement. Artifacts were first discovered in 1929, and an excavation undertaken by the Pennsylvania Historical and Museum Commission took place in July–August 1970. The excavation identified three cemeteries, a village component, stockade, and a longhouse. The excavations uncovered a range of Native and European trade goods dating to the late 17th century.

It was added to the National Register of Historic Places in 2009.
