= Oscar Leibhart Site =

- Oscar Leibhart Site (36YO9)
- U.S. National Register of Historic Places
- Location within Pennsylvania Location within the United States
- Location: Along the Susquehanna River, south of Trinity Church Road and west of Long Level Road, Lower Windsor Township, York County, Pennsylvania
- Coordinates: 39°59′20.4″N 76°30′1″W
- Area: 18 acres (7.3 ha)
- NRHP reference No.: 84003597
- Added to NRHP: May 24, 1984

The Oscar Leibhart Site, designated (36YO9) is an archaeological site located in Lower Windsor Township, York County, Pennsylvania. It was the site of both prehistoric and protohistoric occupation. Digging by landowner Oscar Leibhart began by 1910 with extensive amateur excavations of burials occurring between 1925 and 1936. The Pennsylvania State Museum undertook the excavation of a longhouse in 1956. Additional excavation by Pennsylvania State Archaeologist Barry Kent took place in August 1975. Artifacts uncovered from the site date to the Early Woodland Period (1000 B.C.–200 B.C.) and to the mid-17th century.

A Susquehannock village that was home to roughly 1,200 people was located here from c. 1665 to 1675. The pallisaded village was located on a hilltop 900 feet (270 m) west of the river and 100 feet (30 m) above it. The palisaded village appears on Augustin Herrman's 1670 map of Virginia and Maryland. Three indigenous cemeteries associated with the village have been identified.

The site was added to the National Register of Historic Places in 1984, and was purchased from the Leibhart family in 2008 by the Archaeological Conservancy.
