= Manor Township, Lancaster County, Pennsylvania =

Township in Pennsylvania, US

Coordinates: 39°58′00″N 76°24′59″W

- Township
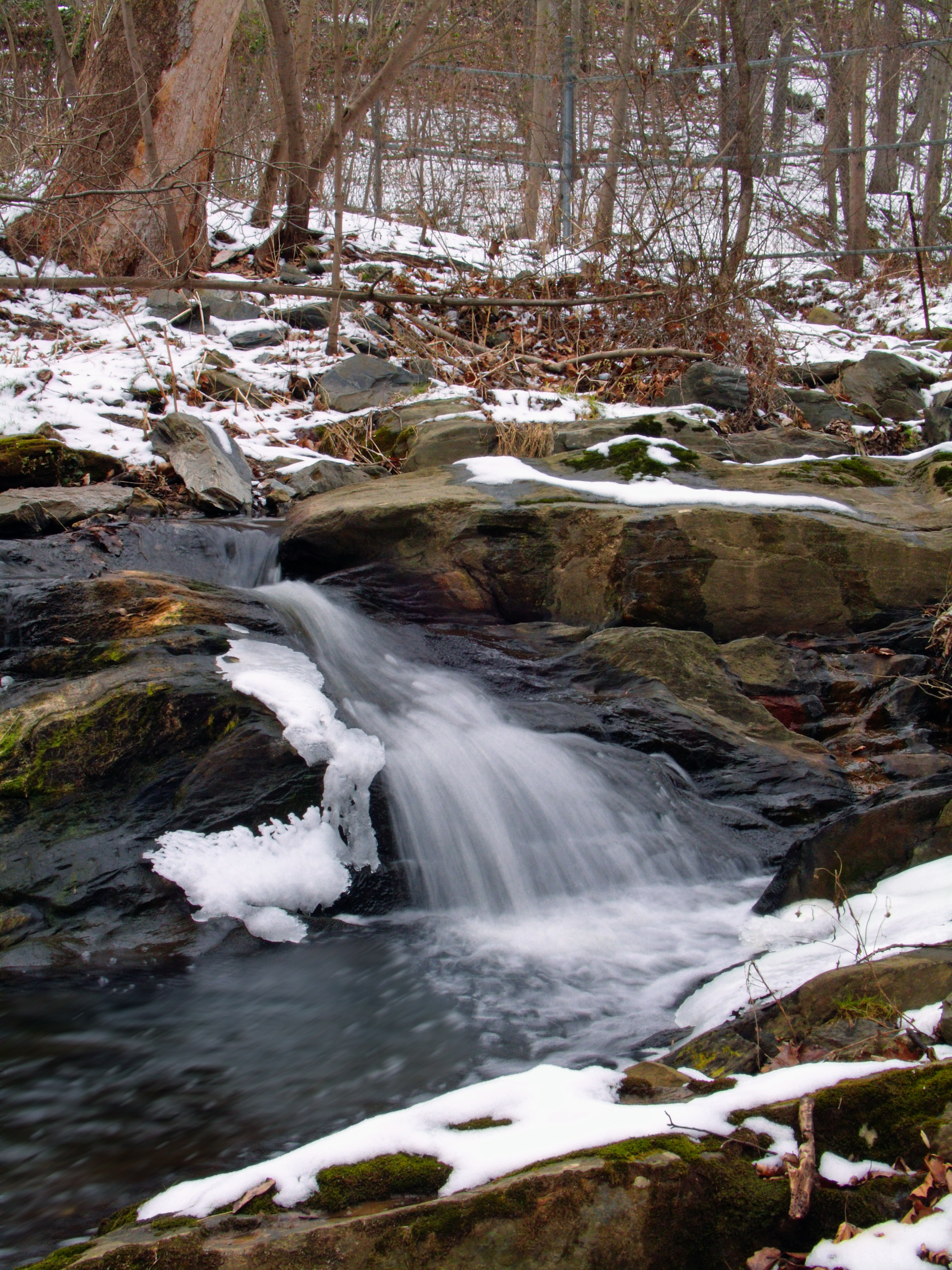
- Mann's Creek

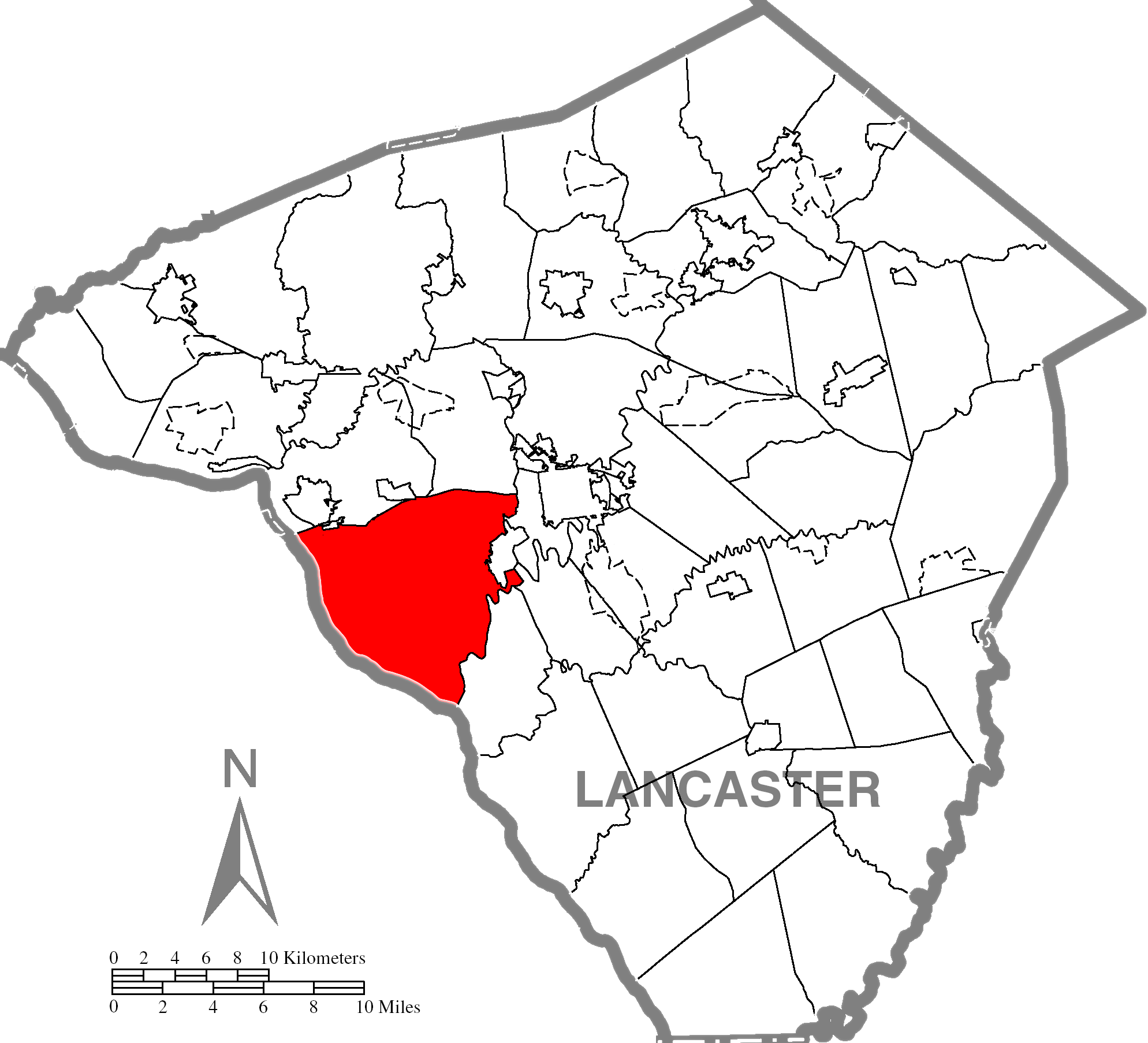
- Map of Lancaster County highlighting Manor Township
- Country: United States
- State: Pennsylvania
- County: Lancaster
- Settled: 1719
- Incorporated: 1730

Government
  - Type: Board of Supervisors

Area
  - Total: 48.62 sq mi (125.92 km^{2})
  - Land: 38.33 sq mi (99.28 km^{2})
  - Water: 10.28 sq mi (26.63 km^{2})

Population (2020)
  - Total: 21,920 ▲
  - Estimate (2021): 21,954
  - Density: 541.5/sq mi (209.06/km^{2})
- Time zone: UTC-5 (Eastern (EST))
  - Summer (DST): UTC-4 (EDT)
- Area code: 717
- FIPS code: 42-071-46992
- Website: www.manortwp.org

Manor Township is a second-class township in west-central Lancaster County, Pennsylvania, United States. As of the 2020 census, it had a population of 21,920.

== History to 1763 ==
Manor Township takes its name from the Manor of Conestoga, which was originally surveyed and reserved for William Penn in 1719, although there is evidence that William Penn visited this area prior to 1690. At this time, the area was Susquehannock territory, and the Susquehannock tribe themselves were the largest tribe in the Susquehanna Valley and had their center of the community within the Turkey Hill part of this territory. The Quaker government thus had surveyors lay off a large area bounded by the Little Conestoga Creek near what is now Millersville to the Susquehanna River and the Conestoga Creek.

When the land was ceded by William Penn to their ancestors in the 1690s, the Susquehannock tribe had lived on the land for quite some time. Their ancestors were Conestoga Native Americans, many of whom were Christian and had lived peacefully with their European neighbors for decades by bartering handicrafts, hunting, and receiving subsistence food given them by the Pennsylvania government. The area was called the Manor of Conestoga and may have been (as some historians speculate that it was) set aside by William Penn as a domain in which the Susquehannock tribe could live and hunt. The Manor contained 16,000 acres east of the Susquehanna River, thus being mostly well-watered flat land that contained rich and fertile soil.

Until the French and Indian War, however, the frontier of Pennsylvania remained largely unsettled. In the aftermath of the war, a new wave of Scots-Irish immigrants who are now known locally as "The Paxton Boys" encroached on the Penn-ceded land in the back country, often doing so in blatant violation of previously-signed treaties. Reverend John Elder, who was the parson at Paxtang, became a leader of these settlers, was known as the "Fighting Parson", and kept his rifle in the pulpit while he delivered his sermons. Elder then helped organize the settlers into a mounted militia and was named Captain of the group, whom called themselves the "Pextony boys" and claimed that the Natives often raided their homes and killed men, women and children.

Although there had been neither Susquehannock nor Conestoga attacks in the area, the Pextony Boys claimed that the Conestoga secretly provided aid and intelligence to their enemies. At daybreak on December 14, 1763, the vigilante group of the Scots-Irish frontiersmen attacked Conestoga homes at Conestoga Town (near present-day Millersville) and scalped and otherwise mutilated the males, raped and murdered the women and children, and burned their cabins, massacring all but 16 of the Natives. The colonial government then held an inquest, and the new governor, John Penn, offered a reward for capture of the Pextony Boys. Penn placed the remaining sixteen Conestoga in protective custody in Lancaster, though the Pextony Boys broke in on December 27, 1763, and murdered as well as dismembered six adults and eight children. The government of Pennsylvania offered a new reward after this second attack, this time $600, for the capture of anyone involved, but the attackers were never identified.

Manor Township therefore still memorializes the murdered Natives by using as its official logo a Native American Chief in full headdress with the date 1763 below it.

== 1763 to 1863 ==
For the next 100 years, the township was subdivided as the large plantations in were cut into smaller tracts to accommodate growing families. In 1846, the 83rd year, the iron industry came to the Township in 1846 when the Iron Works factory was built in the village of Safe Harbor. The Iron Works factory provided jobs for heads of the households as well as the T-shaped rail that was the principal product of the mill.

When the Civil War came close to Manor Township in 1863, the 100th year, Governor Curtin called every able-bodied man to enroll for the defense of the entire State of Pennsylvania. Citizens of Manor Township and Millersville assembled at the headquarters at Safe Harbor, although the invasion threat to Lancaster County ended as the Columbia-Wrightsville Bridge was burned and Lee's army was defeated at the Battle of Gettysburg.

== 1863 and thereafter ==
By 1880, the population of Manor Township was approximately 4,000 people. From the late 1800s through the mid 1900s, the township was known for producing fine tobacco crops, and its farmers produced more tobacco than any township in Lancaster County. Churches and schools were built as the area continued to grow, and the railroad along the western boundary of the township enabled the development of more factories, including a woolen factory near Safe Harbor, match factory in Safe Harbor, and an implement factory near Millersville. In April 1930, construction began on the dam for the Safe Harbor Water Power Corporation and was completed twenty months later.

In 1973, Washington Boro officially merged into Manor Township, and most of Manor Township has remained rural and agricultural in use. The land is considered by soil scientists to be as fertile as any in the United States, and the vast majority of development has occurred in the north eastern section of the Township.

== Geography ==
According to the United States Census Bureau, the township has a total area of 48.6 square miles (125.9 km^{2}), of which 38.5 square miles (99.8 km^{2}) are land and 10.1 square miles (26.1 km^{2}), or 20.70%, are water. Unincorporated communities and neighborhoods in the township include Manor Ridge, West Lancaster, West Ridge, Windom, Washington Boro, Central Manor, Letort, Indian Town, Creswell, Highville, Pittsburg Valley, and part of Donerville.

== Demographics ==
Historical population
Census	Pop.	Note	%±
2000	16,498		—
2010	19,612		18.9%
2020	21,920		11.8%
2021 (est.)	21,954		0.2%
U.S. Decennial Census

As of the census of 2000, there were 16,498 people, 6,464 households, and 4,699 families residing in the township. The population density was 427.9 inhabitants per square mile (165.2/km^{2}). There were 6,710 housing units at an average density of 174.0 per square mile (67.2/km^{2}). The racial makeup of the township was 95.64% White, 1.35% African American, 0.10% Native American, 1.26% Asian, 0.01% Pacific Islander, 0.78% from other races, and 0.86% from two or more races. Hispanic or Latino of any race were 2.28% of the population.

There were 6,464 households, out of which 31.4% had children under the age of 18 living with them, 62.3% were married couples living together, 7.5% had a female householder with no husband present, and 27.3% were non-families. 22.5% of all households were made up of individuals, and 8.9% had someone living alone who was 65 years of age or older. The average household size was 2.53 and the average family size was 2.99.

In the township, the population was spread out, with 24.0% under the age of 18, 7.3% from 18 to 24, 28.6% from 25 to 44, 24.6% from 45 to 64, and 15.4% whom were 65 years of age or older. The median age was 39 years. For every 100 females, there were 95.9 males. For every 100 females age 18 and over, there were 91.2 males.

The median income for a household in the township was $47,806, and the median income for a family was $54,958. Males had a median income of $37,932 versus $27,398 for females. The per capita income for the township was $22,243. About 2.4% of families and 3.8% of the population were below the poverty line, including 3.4% of those under age 18 and 6.2% of those age 65 or over.

The population increased to 19,612 by the time of the 2010 census., and the town continues to maintain its present (160-year-old) form (as of 2019).
