= Monongahela culture =

Archaeological culture in the US

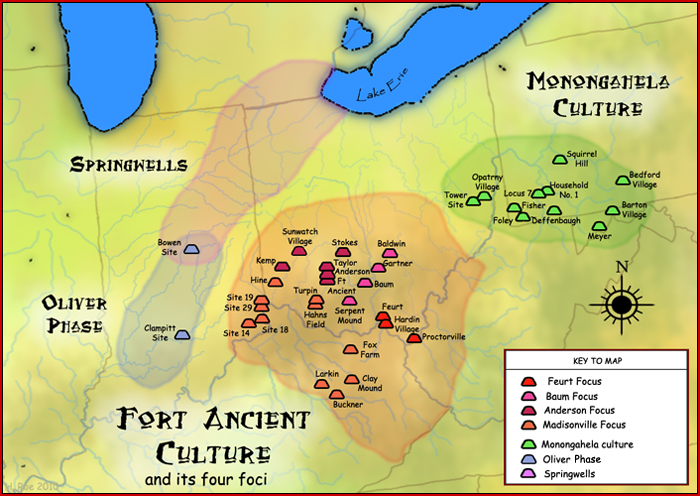
The Monongahela cultural region with some of its major sites and neighbors as of 1050~1635 AD

The Monongahela culture were a Native American cultural manifestation of Late Woodland peoples from AD 1050 to 1635 in present-day Western Pennsylvania, western Maryland, eastern Ohio, and West Virginia. The culture was named by Mary Butler in 1939 for the Monongahela River, whose valley contains the majority of this culture's sites.

The Monongahela practiced maize agriculture, and lived in well laid out villages, some of which consisted of as many as 50-100 structures. They traded with other Indian groups who in turn traded with Europeans. The Monongahela seem to have disappeared some time during the 1620s or 1630s before having significant direct contact with Europeans.

Many scholars believe this to be the result of the spread of European infectious diseases. Others believe that most of the Monongahela were killed by or assimilated into either the Haudenosaunee or the Algonquian-speaking Lenape tribes during warfare, as the more powerful tribes competed to control area hunting grounds for the fur trade. Still others claim that two severe droughts, one from 1587 to 1589 and another from 1607 to 1612, drove habitable area.

== Interculture chronology ==
An internal temporal subdivision of the Monongahela culture, based on ceramic decorative attributes.

Subdivisions	Dates	Ceramic markers
Late Monongahela	AD 1580–1635	Characterized by plain pottery with decoration on lips and inside of the rim, also marks the appearance of ceramic traits that indicate contacts with the Haudenosaunee
Middle Monongahela	AD 1250–1580	Pottery surfaces usually undecorated, with some decoration on the lip of the pot including notching, incising, or stamping with a cord-wrapped paddle
Early Monongahela	AD 1050–1250	Characterized by pottery decorated with rectangular incising, horizontal punctuated bands, or both

== Location ==
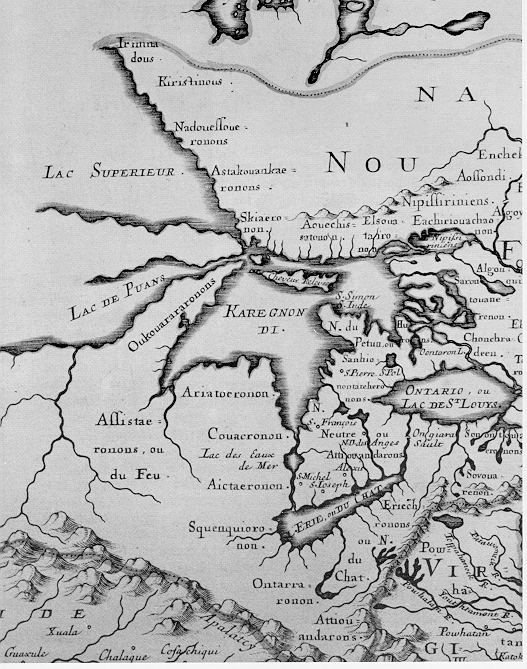
Clip of 1656 (3) LE CANADA OU NOUVELLE FRANCE &C. by Nicolas Sanson. In the Wendat (Huron) Iroquoian language, Akounake means "people of a strange language", and Attiouandron means "people of a similar language" (see lower part of map). Various "Smith Maps" by Captain John Smith, note the Virginia Indians refer to those to the west of the Allegheny Mountains as Messawomeck. Riviere de la Ronceverte (Greenbrier River) scholars assert the early French Jesuits did not see the main Ohio River during these decades.

The Monongahela culture extended in the area of the upper Ohio River system that includes the Monongahela, Youghiogheny and Casselman tributary rivers. Their region was of western Pennsylvania and the adjoining areas of eastern Ohio, West Virginia, and western Maryland. Nearly four hundred archaeological sites have been recorded. The culture was contemporaneous to the bordering Fort Ancient culture in the Ohio Valley.

The Monongahela is a Late Woodland horizon that coincides with the Massawomeck people, and after the end of the Monongahela culture coincides with homeland of the Haudenosaunee League migrants to Ohio termed Mingo. Monongahela villages originated on flood plains, but by 1250, the people had migrated to the watershed highlands and often lived on gaps between ridges. Archaeologists speculate that the move to these areas, and construction of larger, fortified villages at this time was a symptom of intergroup warfare.

The Fort Hill Site (46MG12) in Morgantown, West Virginia is a nearly 5-acre (20,000 m^{2}) archaeological site that includes what appears to be a Monongahela village. The site has good preservation. A human burial, animal bones, bone beads, a marginella-shell bead, shell-tempered pottery and triangular arrow points have been recovered during excavations at the site. In 2002 the site was endangered with destruction by commercial development.

The majority of the 18 known sites within the Osage USGS Quadrangle and the Blacksville USGS Quadrangle on the environs of the Pennsylvania and West Virginia border are of the Monongahela Culture. The Worley village Complex (46Mg23) dates to about AD 900. It is located within the Blacksville USGS Quadrangle, as is the recently found Wana village site, which was revealed by infrared photography. A field test at the Wana site confirmed pottery, shell, and flint present. It has not yet been studied.

The LaPoe (46Mg21) village complex in Monongalia County, West Virginia is a circular village occupied during the 16th and 17th centuries, with trade items recovered. Nearby LaPoe, 46Mg18 is a stone burial mound. Also located at LaPoe is the village site 46Mg20. Pyle Farm, 46Mg15, is a late prehistoric village site that is located in the Osage USGS Quadrangle. In addition, hundreds of undocumented archaeological sites exist in the Dunkard Creek Watershed of Greene County, Pennsylvania and Monongalia County, West Virginia.

== Material culture ==
=== Ceramics ===
Monongahela pottery was constructed using the coil method, tempered using crushed igneous rock (e.g., granite) or quartz temper, and usually decorated with cordmarking. (Mayer-Oakes’ 1955) To quote the Maryland Archaeological Conservation Lab, "Monongahela ceramics are a complex series that begin with an early grit or limestone tempered group and end with a very anomalous collection of types found in southwestern Pennsylvania during the post-Contact period."

According to the collaborative research of 2009 of William C. Johnson (Society for Pennsylvania Archaeology) and D. Scott Speedy (Grave Creek Mound Archaeology Complex Research Facility in West Virginia), Monongahela tradition women favored the production of final Z-twist cordage production. On the upper Ohio River drainage basin subareas, some pottery apparently represents the incorporation of local Late Woodland groups with their own distinctive cordage-manufacturing traditions. As Johnson and Speedy say in their abstract, "In the absence of elaborately decorated ceramics, variations in the relative frequency of the predominant cordage twist direction peculiar to some subareas also suggest that twist direction may function as a group signature, thus permitting identification of individual or related village removals that may be synonymous with tribes."

=== Village construction ===
Monongahela houses were small oval to round shaped and were built within palisaded villages with a central plaza. These villages' entry point often had a maze-like structure that overlapped the stockaded outer walls. Differing from Fort Ancient methods, some entrances were covered. Some of the villages had elevated observation platforms.

Charnel houses have been found in the larger villages. Black bear masks have been found in some graves, showing a possible indication of a rank. Of the average adult burials, it is not clearly understood where they might have been buried. To distinguish the characteristics between Fort Ancient and interior Monongahelan of West Virginia, Dr. McMichael writes, "A reflection of the Monongahela's greater Woodland heritage was the continued use of small stone mounds in the Monongahela drainage area, well into the Late Prehistoric." Child burials were sometimes inside the village and sometimes under the house. This contrasted with Andaste (Susquehannock) burials from 1450/1550, which were outside the palisaded village, as found east of the Allegheny Mountains.

By 1450, petal-shaped attachments to their houses became common. These were used for storage or perhaps a smokehouse. Monongahela pottery and tools were well crafted and included decorated clay pipes for smoking. Glass trade beads have been found at some villages, although there is no record of European contact.

=== Agriculture and food ===
Like its sister culture the Fort Ancient, the Monongahela made a leap in agriculture by adopting seed crops from Mesoamerica, which had been obtained through their ancestral trade network. The women cultivated varieties of crops such as maize, beans, squash, and sunflower, collecting their seeds to use in subsequent years. They also collected wild plant foods, such as nuts and berries, to complete their diets. As with many contemporary groups to the west and south, they depended on maize as the major staple of their diet. The Monongahela men hunted animals including deer and turtles, and caught fish and shell fish.

They made advances in the cultivation of tobacco and hemp braid crops, and traded these with the East Coast agriculturists. In 1599 - 1600 the English geographer and propagandist Richard Hakluyt reported on Native American foods of the mid-Atlantic coastal people with whom they also traded. As evidence of that trade, sea shells from the mid-Atlantic have been found in some Monongahela sites.

== Disappearance ==
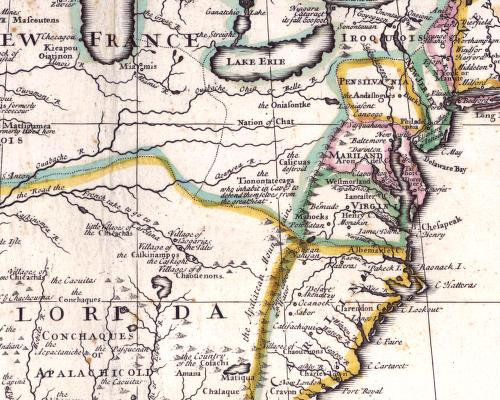
Clip from John Senex map ca 1710, showing the peoples Captain Vielle passed by in 1692 to reach Chaouenon country, as the French Jesuit called the Shawnee.

This late prehistoric culture peaked about AD 1300. The colder weather of the Little Ice Age may have caused inter-group battling over food and farmland, according to some scholars. The crops did not prosper as well during this colder period, causing food shortages for populations that had grown after their introduction. Some studies show that the culture began failing due to poor health conditions.

In addition, some scholars believe that two severe droughts, one from 1587 to 1589 and another from 1607 to 1612, drove the bearer of the Monongahela culture from the region in search of a more habitable area. Because of trade with other groups, the Monongahela could have contracted infectious diseases from coastal peoples, who were directly exposed by their contact with Europeans. As the Native Americans did not have immunity, the new diseases resulted in high fatalities in widespread areas.

The Monongahela culture was progressively disappearing before the time the Haudenosaunee League invaded the Allegheny Plateau through to the Lake Erie region in an effort to control new hunting grounds for the lucrative fur trade. The powerful Haudenosaunee likely conquered or drove out the Monongahela.

Around 1635, it appears that a group of refugees from the Monongahela culture resettled in south-central Virginia at Halifax County. They were likely absorbed by a Siouan-speaking tribe of the area, but historians do not know for sure. There were also Algonquian and Iroquoian-speaking tribes nearby.

== See also ==
- Prehistory of West Virginia
- Protohistory of West Virginia
