= Mount Joy, Pennsylvania =

Borough in Pennsylvania, US

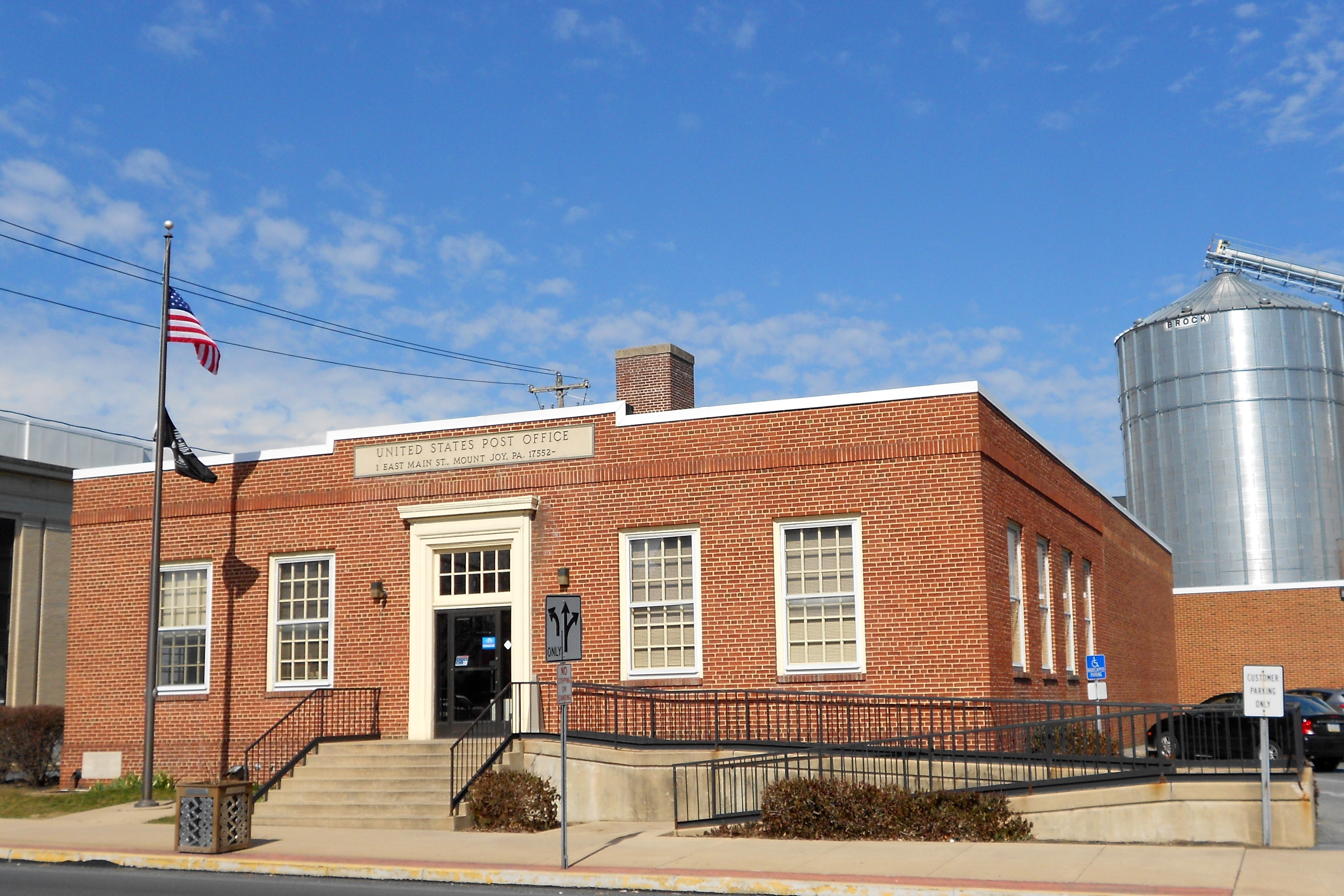
- Mount Joy post office

- Location in Lancaster County, Pennsylvania

- Location in Pennsylvania Location in the United States
- Coordinates: 40°06′36″N 76°30′40″W
- Country: United States
- State: Pennsylvania
- County: Lancaster

Government
  - Mayor: Timothy D. Bradley Jr. (R)

Area
  - Total: 2.42 sq mi (6.28 km^{2})
  - Land: 2.41 sq mi (6.24 km^{2})
  - Water: 0.015 sq mi (0.04 km^{2})
- Elevation: 371 ft (113 m)

Population (2020)
  - Total: 8,325
  - Density: 3,453.0/sq mi (1,333.22/km^{2})
- Time zone: UTC-5 (EST)
  - Summer (DST): UTC-4 (EDT)
- ZIP code: 17552
- Area codes: 717 and 223
- FIPS code: 42-51656
- Website: www.mountjoyborough.com

Mount Joy is a borough in Lancaster County, Pennsylvania, United States. The population was 8,346 at the 2020 census, and an estimated 8,323 in 2021.

== Name and origin ==
The name is often shortened to "Mt Joy", as in Mencken (1963). However, citizens of the town often point out that this abbreviation is not proper because the town is not named for a mountain but is named after the "Good Ship" Mountjoy which famously broke a Catholic siege during the Siege of Derry. Due to the early settlement of the Protestant Scots-Irish in this region of Pennsylvania, many of the municipalities in the area were given names common to the North of Ireland, such as Derry Township, Londonderry Township, South Londonderry Township, Mount Joy Township, East Donegal Township, West Donegal Township, and Rapho Township.

Mount Joy is often named in lists of "delightfully-named towns" in Pennsylvania Dutch Country, along with Intercourse, Blue Ball, Lititz, Bareville, Bird-in-Hand and Paradise.

== General information ==
- ZIP code: 17552
- Area code: 717
- Local phone codes: 492, 653, 928

== Geography ==
Mount Joy is located in northwestern Lancaster County at 40°6′36″N 76°30′40″W (40.109895, -76.510977). Pennsylvania Route 230 passes through the center of town as Main Street, leading southeast 12 miles (19 km) to Lancaster, the county seat, and northwest 6 miles (10 km) to Elizabethtown. Harrisburg, the state capital, is 25 miles (40 km) to the northwest via PA-230. PA-772 crosses PA-230 west of the borough center and leads northeast 7 miles (11 km) to Manheim and southwest 5 miles (8 km) to Marietta on the Susquehanna River.

According to the United States Census Bureau, the borough has a total area of 2.4 square miles (6.3 km^{2}), of which 0.02 square miles (0.04 km^{2}), or 0.64%, are water. Little Chiques Creek, a south-flowing tributary of Chiques Creek and part of the Susquehanna River watershed, crosses the eastern side of the borough.

In the 1970s, Mount Joy was chosen as the site of one of ten Decision Information Distribution System radio stations, designed to alert the public of an enemy attack. The system was never implemented and the station was not built.

== Demographics ==
Historical population
| Census | Pop. | Note | %± |
|---|---|---|---|
| 1860 | 1,729 | | — |
| 1870 | 1,896 | | 9.7% |
| 1880 | 2,058 | | 8.5% |
| 1890 | 1,848 | | −10.2% |
| 1900 | 2,018 | | 9.2% |
| 1910 | 2,166 | | 7.3% |
| 1920 | 2,192 | | 1.2% |
| 1930 | 2,716 | | 23.9% |
| 1940 | 2,855 | | 5.1% |
| 1950 | 3,006 | | 5.3% |
| 1960 | 3,292 | | 9.5% |
| 1970 | 5,041 | | 53.1% |
| 1980 | 5,680 | | 12.7% |
| 1990 | 6,398 | | 12.6% |
| 2000 | 6,765 | | 5.7% |
| 2010 | 7,410 | | 9.5% |
| 2020 | 8,325 | | 12.3% |
| 2021 (est.) | 8,323 | ▼ | 0.0% |

The 2010 United States census reports the following demographics for Mount Joy Borough:

- Total population: 7,410
- Male: 3,624
- Female: 3,786
- Hispanic or Latino: 549
- White: 6,809
- African American: 187
- Asian: 58
- American Indian and Alaska Native: 20
- Identified by two or more: 170

== Museums and historic sites ==
- Central Hotel
- Donegal Mills Plantation
- George Brown's Sons Cotton and Woolen Mill
- Nissly Swiss Chocolate Company

== Notable people ==
- Kaufman Thuma "K.T." Keller, president and CEO, Chrysler Corporation
- Joseph F. Knipe, brigadier general, 46th PA Infantry, during the American Civil War
- Donald Kraybill, researcher and author on Anabaptist groups
- Clarence Charles Newcomer (1923–2005), United States federal judge
- Winfred Trexler Root, historian
- Mike Sarbaugh, coach, New York Mets
- Bruce Sutter, Major League Baseball pitcher and National Baseball Hall of Fame and Museum inductee
