= Chickies Historic District =

Historic district in Pennsylvania, United States

- U.S. National Register of Historic Places
- U.S. Historic district
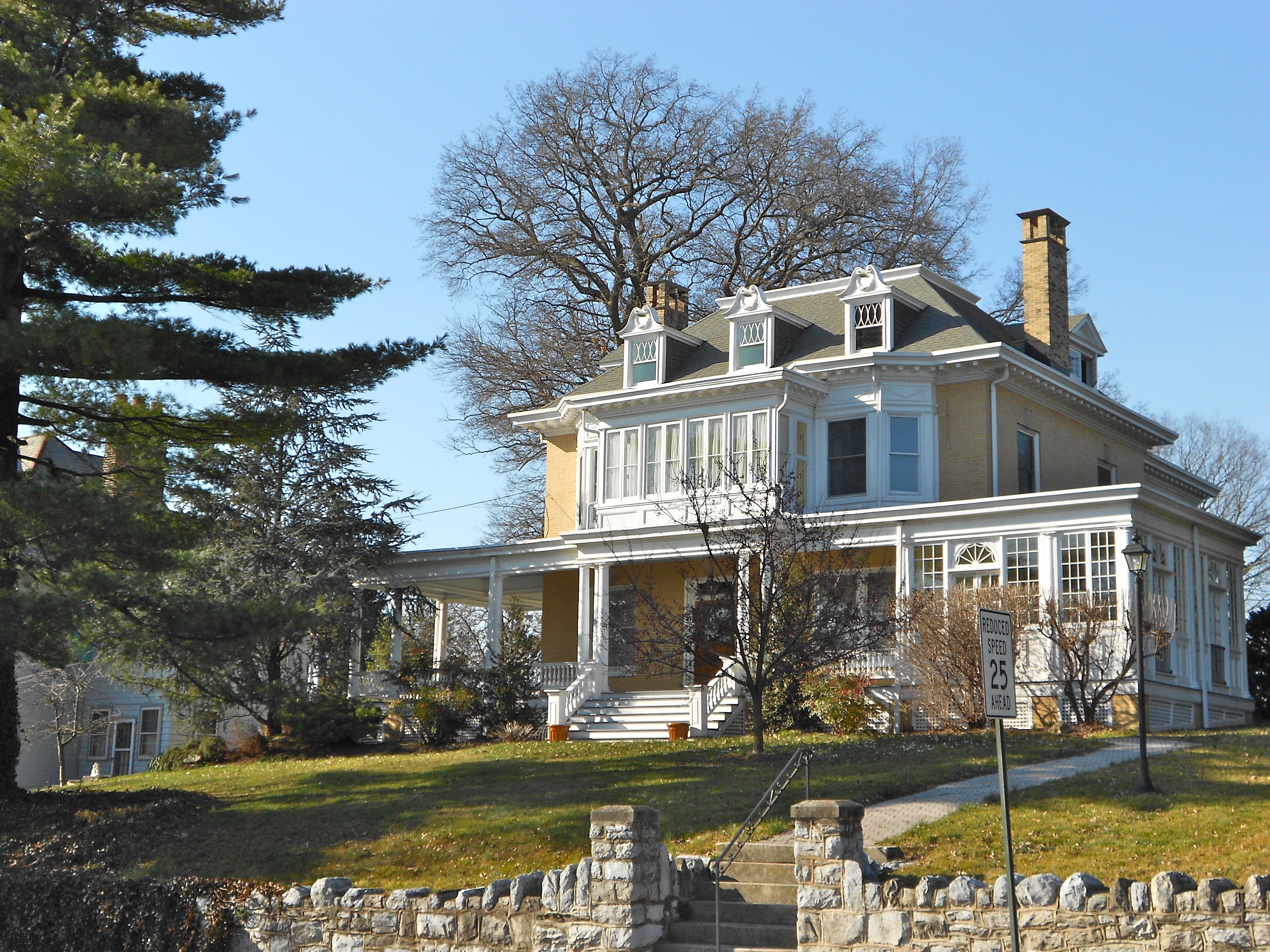
- House in Chickies Historic District, February 2012

- Location within Pennsylvania Location within the United States
- Location: Roughly bounded by the Susquehanna R, Chickies Creek, Bank St. and Long Lane., East Donegal Township, West Hempfield Township, and Marietta, Pennsylvania
- Coordinates: 40°03′27″N 76°33′28″W
- Area: 589 acres (238 ha)
- Architectural style: Early Republic, Late Victorian
- NRHP reference No.: 05001488
- Added to NRHP: December 28, 2005

Chickies Historic District is a national historic district located at East Donegal Township, West Hempfield Township, and Marietta, Lancaster County, Pennsylvania, United States. The district includes 32 contributing buildings, 16 contributing sites, and four contributing structures in three areas. They are: 1) floodplain along the Susquehanna River containing archaeological remains of iron furnaces; 2) the "Ironmasters' Hill" area of Marietta with five residences associated with ironmasters (c. 1848–1876); and 3) the Donegal Creek area with farmland, iron pits, and limestone quarries owned by the ironmasters.

It was listed on the National Register of Historic Places in 2005.
