= Mary Ellen Graydon Sharpe =

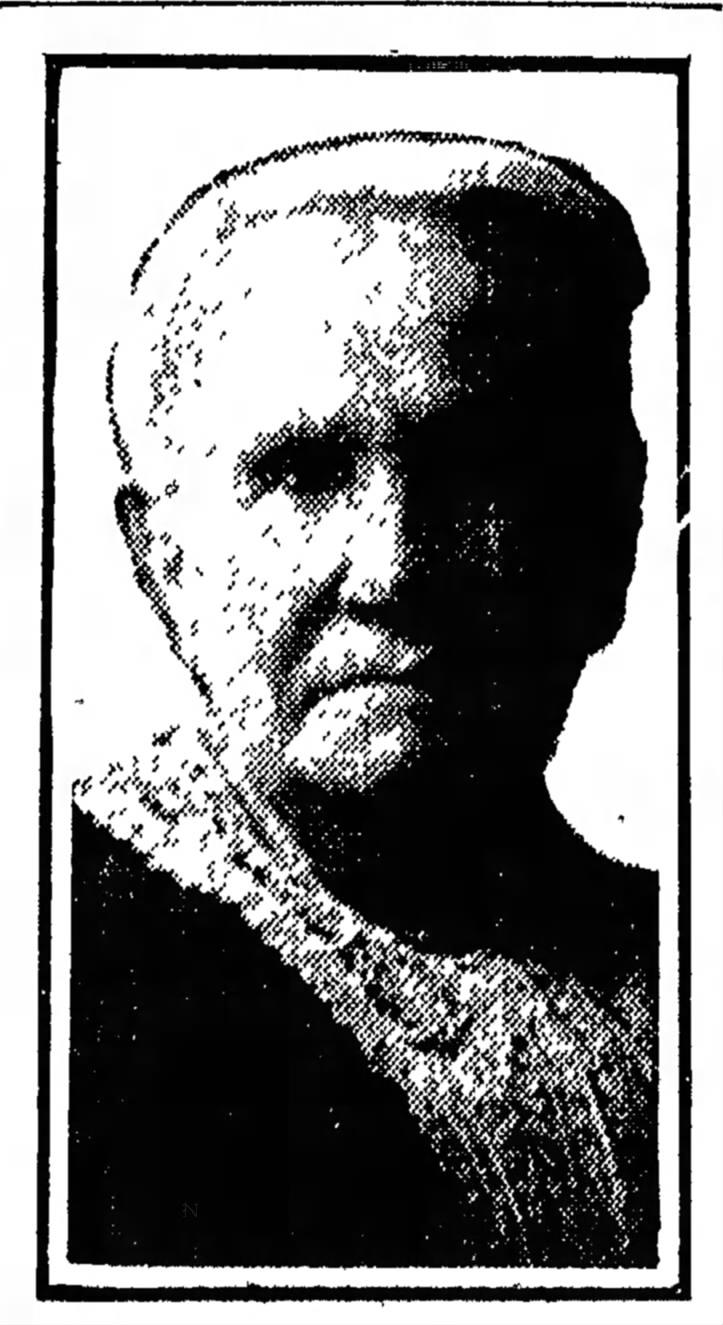
- Born: January 6, 1823; Harrisburg
- Died: May 14, 1914 (aged 91); Indianapolis
- Occupation: Writer
- Children: Joseph Kinne Sharpe, Julia Graydon Sharpe
- Parent(s): Alexander Graydon, III; Jane Chambers McKinney Graydon

Mary Ellen Graydon Sharpe (January 6, 1823 – May 14, 1914) was an American writer.

Mary Ellen Graydon Sharpe was born in Harrisburg, Pennsylvania to Alexander Graydon III, an iron manufacturer and Underground Railroad conductor, and Jane Chambers (McKinney) Graydon, an abolitionist and Civil War nurse. She was educated at the Cedar Hill Seminary in Mount Joy, Pennsylvania. In 1843 she moved to Indianapolis, Indiana with her parents. In 1847, she married Joseph Kinne Sharpe, a businessman, in a ceremony presided over by the Rev. Henry Ward Beecher. They had nine children, including artist Julia Graydon Sharpe and inventor Joseph Kinne Sharpe Jr.

Sharpe's work was published in the Atlantic Monthly, The Century, Independent, Interior, Current, St. Nicholas, and The Youth's Companion. She published two books, As The Years Go By (1913), a volume of poetry, and A Family Retrospect (1909), a short family history.

Mary Ellen Graydon Sharpe died on 14 May 1914 in Indianapolis. She is buried in Crown Hill Cemetery and Arboretum in Section 3, Lot 16 (39.8178581°N 86.1728787°W) in Indianapolis, Indiana.

== Bibliography ==
- A Family Retrospect. Indianapolis, 1909.
- As The Years Go By. Indianapolis, 1913.
