= Cameron Estate =

Historic house in Pennsylvania, United States

- U.S. National Register of Historic Places
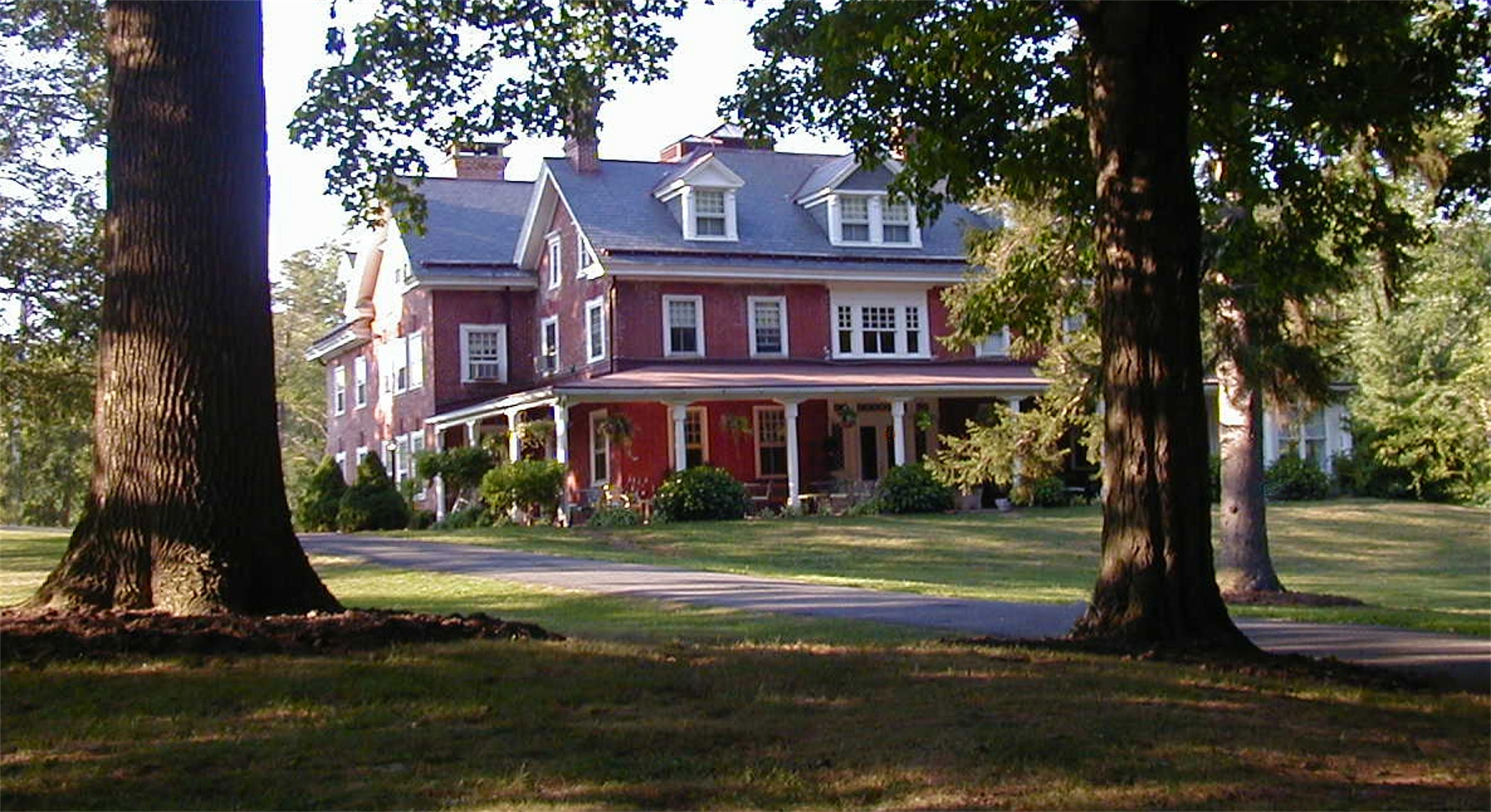
- Cameron Estate "Mansion House"

- Location within Pennsylvania Location within the United States
- Nearest city: Mount Joy, Pennsylvania, U.S.
- Coordinates: 40.10286°N 76.56829°W
- Area: 15.3 acres (6.2 ha)
- Built: 1872
- Built by: John Watson
- Architectural style: Colonial Revival
- NRHP reference No.: 75001646
- Added to NRHP: November 03, 1975

Cameron Estate is one of the five summer homes of President Abraham Lincoln's Secretary of War, Simon Cameron and his family from 1872 to 1959.

Often once referred to as "Donegal" by the Camerons, the Estate is located in Mount Joy in Lancaster County, Pennsylvania.

== History ==
The Stephenson Years (1738–1785) The Cameron Estate started out as a 314-acre (1.27 km^{2}) tract of land north of and adjoining the Donegal Presbyterian Church and was part of the church's glebe (acreage set aside for the support of the church). James Stephenson acquired the property in 1738 from the William Penn land grant and received a patent (deed) in 1749. The land passed to James' son Nathaniel. As Nathaniel died without issue, the property passed to his sister Hannah Stevenson (great-great grandmother of President McKinley). Ann Stephenson, Hannah's sister, married into the Watson Family whose son David Watson, grandson of James Stephenson, was deeded the property in 1780. David Watson was a prominent patriot, and a justice of the Court of Common Pleas and his two grandsons, David C. and Nathaniel, became physicians with large practices in Donegal (an unincorporated area around the Donegal Presbyterian Church not Donegal, Pennsylvania).

The Watson Years (1785–1872) Dr. John Watson, son of David Watson, was deeded the property in 1785. Dr. John Watson owned and resided on the Cameron's "Donegal", then called the Stephenson (sometimes spelled Stevenson) farm at Donegal Springs. Dr. John Watson built the original part of the Cameron Estate farm house in 1805. At its time of construction, the "Mansion House" was the largest brick structure on the western frontier. The 1805 structure was a two-story Federal style classic four-square with a dining wing thus forming an L-shaped structure. The front porch of the farm house faced south overlooking the Donegal Presbyterian Church and Donegal Spring. The house rests on a knoll rising from Donegal creek and surrounded by ancient poplars, oaks, black walnuts, hickory and maples.

Dr. Watson owned and occupied the farm until his death, which occurred on November 16, 1843 (buried at Donegal Presbyterian Graveyard, grave No. 43). His son, Dr. Nathaniel Watson, sold the farm to the Hon. Simon Cameron in 1872.[3]

The Cameron Years (1872–1961)

In 1872 Cameron bought the estate which contained the red-brick farmhouse built in 1805. Simon Cameron and his family transformed it into one of the most magnificent estates in Lancaster County. The estate was one of the summer homes of Simon Cameron and was affectionately referred to as "Donegal" by the Cameron family. Simon Cameron was President Lincoln's first secretary of war and four-time United States Senator. His son, James Donald Cameron was Secretary of War to President Ulysses S. Grant and U.S. Senator from 1877 to 1897. Although Simon Cameron had already amassed several estates near Harrisburg prior to the Civil War, he set to work purchasing the old glebe farms surrounding the Donegal Presbyterian Church on which his grandfather and great-grandfather had worked.

Behind a pair of ornamental iron gates is what remains of the Cameron Estate (Donegal) located in rural western Lancaster County, Pennsylvania. The massive entry gates to the estate once provided access to the state capital in Harrisburg and were moved to the estate by Simon Cameron. Two sets of gates were relocated to the estate; one positioned on Mansion Lane and the other on Colebrook Road near the intersection of Donegal Springs Road and Colebrook road. At present only the pair of gates on Mansion Lane has survived. The estate is currently a 15.25-acre (61,700 m^{2}) tract of land south of Rheems and midway between Elizabethtown and Mount Joy, Pennsylvania (GPS coordinates 40° 6’ 11” North 76° 34’ 2” West).

At its peak, the estate comprised 1,200 acres (4.9 km^{2}) of land. In addition to purchasing numerous farms surrounding the estate, Simon Cameron purchased the state fish hatchery housed on Hoover's spring one of the group Donegal springs, for $2,000 on June 12, 1883. The purchase was for 1-acre (4,000 m^{2}) of land, a wood framed hatchery building and the water rights to the Donegal Spring. The source of the water for the hatchery was from a spring in the basement of Michael Hoover's house a two-story red brick farmhouse. To facilitate the building of the hatchery in 1873 a stone reservoir next to the house was built to raise the water level to assist the water feed to the hatchery. Hoover Spring originates in the basement of the red brick farmhouse behind the Cameron Estate.

The current mansion is a graceful three-story barn-red-brick mansion in the Colonial Revival Federal style. It was one of Simon Cameron's prized estate and occupied by his family from 1872 until 1959 when the last Cameron, Mary died. During Simon Cameron's tenure, few changes were made to the farm house and it was not until his son James Donald Cameron (Don Cameron) acquired the house was it enlarged to its current size of over 12,500 square feet (1,160 m^{2}).

Don Cameron set out to transform the house and in 1889 removed the roof and added the third floor and expanded its footprint northward. It is purported that Don Cameron's second wife, Elizabeth "Lizzie" Tucumpsen Sherman, was not pleased with the house as it was not grand enough for her liking and status. While the fashion of the time was to add mansard roofs, Don Cameron kept the Federal style but unified the house with Colonial Revival embellishments. Of particular note is the addition of the stylized "Pennsylvania Keystone" above the windows on the West side of the mansion. The last expansion was completed in 1914. While the grandeur of the house was enhanced, the smell from the barn on the west side of the house was found to be most offensive to Don's second wife, and therefore the barn was dismantled and moved to another part of the farm. The barnyard yard was then filled in and a rose garden planted.

“Donegal” was a working farm with the major crops being tobacco and watercress. In addition to crops J. Don Cameron bred award-winning Trotting Horses, Thoroughbreds and Welsh ponies for show and racing. Don Cameron planted 100 acres (0.40 km^{2}) in blue grass to breed his Thoroughbreds.

The estate currently has five remaining buildings, underground armory, and a water tower. The buildings still present are the main house, summer kitchen, carriage barn, tool shed and pump house. An old drawing of the estate shows several other buildings whose remains can be seen during the summer when the foundations heat up and burn through the grass.

The main house was built in 1805 and expanded over the many years to its current size of approximately 12,500 square feet (1,160 m^{2}). The house was a private residence until Mary Cameron, Cameron's granddaughter, estate sold 15.25 acres (61,700 m^{2}) of the property to Elizabethtown College in 1961. The college used the property for many purposes. It served as a dormitory for men on the Dean's List and a school for special needs children. In 1975 Mrs. G. Howland Chase, a great granddaughter of Simon Cameron funded a restoration of the mansion which Elizabethtown College uses as a conference center with lodging in the mansion. The mansion was converted into a country inn in 1981 by Lancaster County culinary celebrity Betty Groff along with her husband Abe. The Groff's sold the inn in 1996.

The summer kitchen sits 15 feet (4.6 m) north of the mansion. The wood-frame structure with a slate was expanded to include an office and converted to owner's quarters in the 1980s.

The carriage house located 100 yards from the mansion once housed Mary Cameron's Packard car collection and in the attic was the chauffeur’s residence. The carriage house was converted to a conference center in the 1975 restoration. In 2002 the carriage house was renovated and is now the wedding reception venue capable of seating 250 guests.

The tool shed, 18 by 35 feet was just west of the carriage barn and was incorporated into the carriage barn.

A unique pump house for its time sits across the creek northeast of the mansion. When the 10 ft by 10 ft building was built in 1889, it was constructed in a new experimental technique, poured-in-place concrete. The window sills and corbels are of stone and the floor, walls and flat roof are all poured-in-place concrete. The pump house sits atop a seep cistern where a gas fired piston pump transported the water to a massive water tower located on the ridge above the property. The water then gravity fed back to the house as its water supply.

North of the kitchen is an underground armory built by James Donald Cameron while he was Secretary of War under U. S. Grant. Cameron Estate was headquarters for Don Cameron when he was in Pennsylvania and while he hosted U. S. Grant. Since they both frequented the property, an armory was needed to store munitions for the troops protecting the President. The entrance faces north toward the creek with a roof height of three to four feet. Upon Mary Cameron's death in 1959, the "Cameron Estate" was dissolved and sold as nine separate farms.

The Elizabethtown College Years (1961–1981) The house was a private residence of Mary Cameron until the 15.25 acres of the property was sold by Mary Cameron's estate to Elizabethtown College 15.25 acres (61,700 m^{2}) in 1961. The college used the property for many purposes. Charles Baugher, president of the college, designated the property for faculty and student housing, while hosting a satellite campus for special education in collaboration with the Downingtown Special School. It served as a dormitory for men on the Dean's List and a school for special needs children. In 1975 Mrs. G. Howland Chase, a great granddaughter of Simon Cameron funded a restoration of the mansion. Elizabethtown College used it as a conference center with lodging in the mansion. The mansion was converted into a country inn in 1981 by Lancaster County culinary celebrity Betty Groff and her husband, Abe. Betty and Abe Groff sold the inn in 1996.

== The current state of the estate ==
Today his home has been transformed into the Cameron Estate Inn, a property consisting of giant shade trees of hemlock, oak and maple, spring gardens of irises, peonies and bleeding hearts and a walled rose garden. An old stone bridge, built in 1875, arches over a stream that bisects the 15-acre (61,000 m^{2}) estate.

Visitors at the Cameron Estate Inn may wander the landscaped grounds of the Inn and those of the historic Donegal Scottish Presbyterian Church. Outside the gates, one can saunter along an avenue of towering maples planted by Cameron, who got wind of the imminent passage of a bill encouraging farmers to beautify the roads by offering $2 for each tree planted. He proceeded to plant thousands on the roads leading to Donegal, only to find the new law stipulated that the trees had to be inside one's fences.

James Donald Cameron, who expanded the mansion to its present scale, succeeded his father as senator and served as Secretary of War under President Ulysses S. Grant; James McCormick Cameron, grandson and president of the Cameron's Dauphin Deposit Bank; and Mary Cameron, granddaughter, civic benefactor and last of the clan, all made their contributions to the family homestead. No major exterior alterations have been made since 1918.

James Donald Cameron, the eldest son of Simon Cameron and U. S. Grant's Secretary of War, died at Donegal on August 30, 1918.
