= Byers-Muma House =

Historic house in Pennsylvania, United States

- U.S. National Register of Historic Places
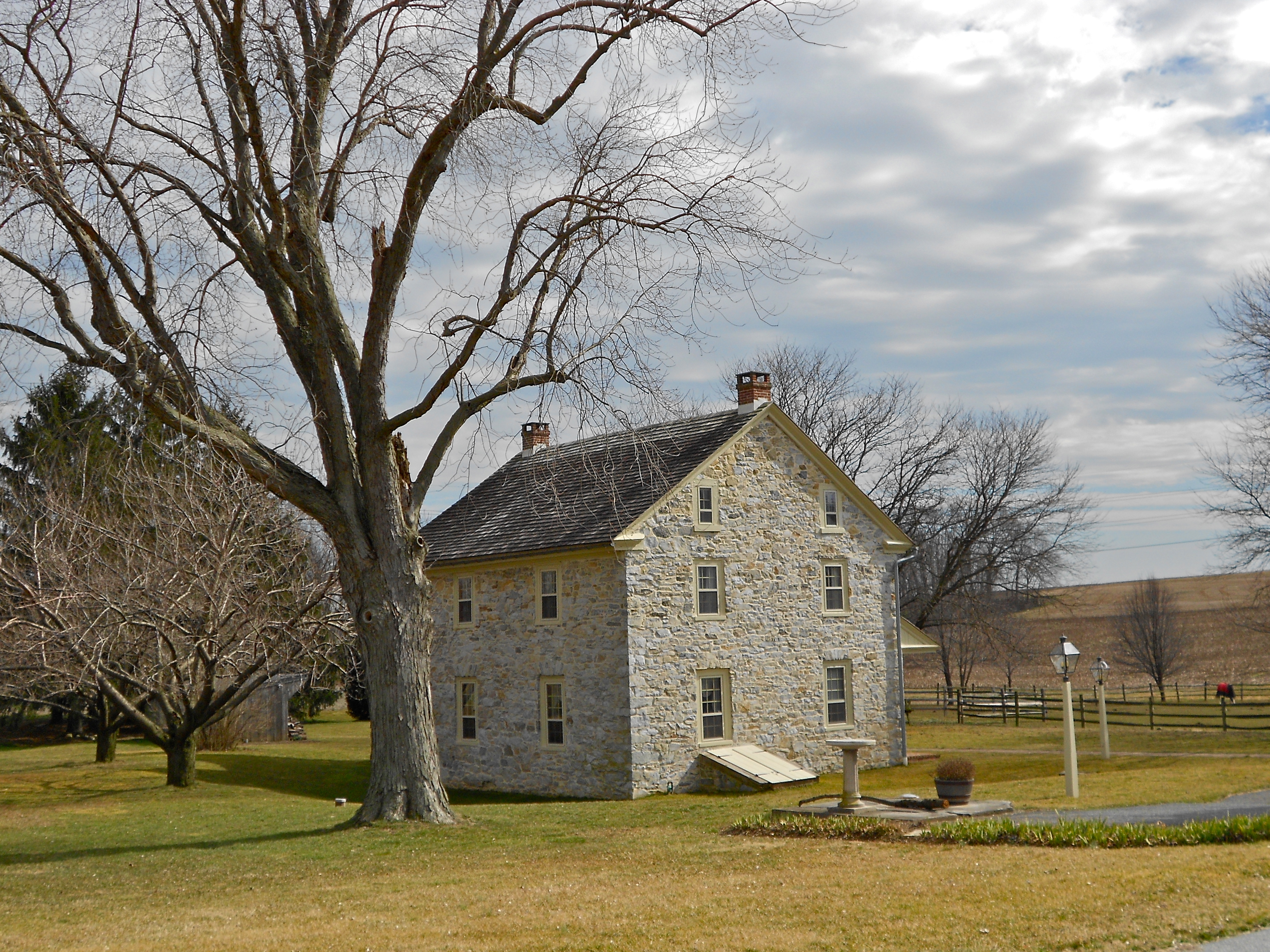
- House in February, 2012

- Location within Pennsylvania Location within the United States
- Location: 1402 Trout Run Rd., East Donegal Township, Pennsylvania
- Coordinates: 40°5′12″N 76°33′4″W
- Area: less than one acre
- Built: c 1740, c. 1805, c. 1840–1850, 1998
- Architectural style: Colonial, Georgian
- NRHP reference No.: 02000070
- Added to NRHP: February 22, 2002

Byers-Muma House is a historic home located in East Donegal Township, Lancaster County, Pennsylvania. It is a 2 1/2-story, stone dwelling with Pennsylvania German Colonial and Georgian style design influences. The original section was built about 1740, with additions about 1805, 1840–1850, and 1998. Also on the property is a mid-18th century well.

It was listed on the National Register of Historic Places in 2002.
