= Donegal Creek =

Stream in Pennsylvania, USA

Coordinates: 40.055°N 76.524°W

Donegal Creek is a 6.0-mile-long (9.7 km) tributary of Chiques Creek in Lancaster County, Pennsylvania in the United States.

The stream rises from Donegal Springs in East Donegal Township. Donegal Creek joins Chiques Creek 0.26 miles (0.42 km) upstream of the Susquehanna River.

== See also ==
- List of rivers of Pennsylvania
