= Grove Mansion =

Historic house in Pennsylvania, United States

- U.S. National Register of Historic Places
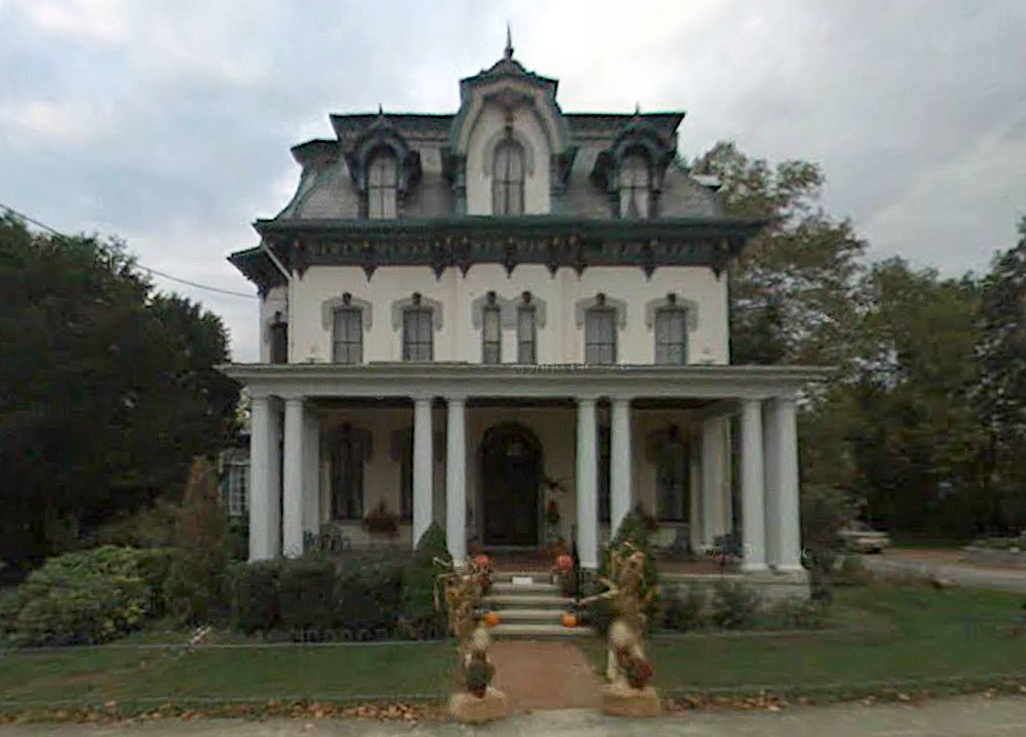

- Location within Pennsylvania Location within the United States
- Location: 133 S. River Street, Maytown, East Donegal Township, Pennsylvania
- Coordinates: 40°4′21″N 76°34′49″W
- Area: 0.7 acres (0.28 ha)
- Built: 1882-1887
- Architectural style: Second Empire
- NRHP reference No.: 83002251
- Added to NRHP: April 21, 1983

Grove Mansion, also known as the Green, earlier Townsend, Residence is an historic home that is located in Maytown in East Donegal Township, Lancaster County, Pennsylvania, United States.

It was listed on the National Register of Historic Places in 1983.

== History and architectural features ==
Built between 1882 and 1887, this historic structure is a three-story, three-bay by four-bay, brick dwelling that was designed in the Second Empire style. It features a "bell cast" mansard roof with patterned red and gray slate. Also located on the property are a contributing pony house and carriage house, both topped with elaborate cupolas.
