= Jane Chambers McKinney Graydon =

American abolitionist

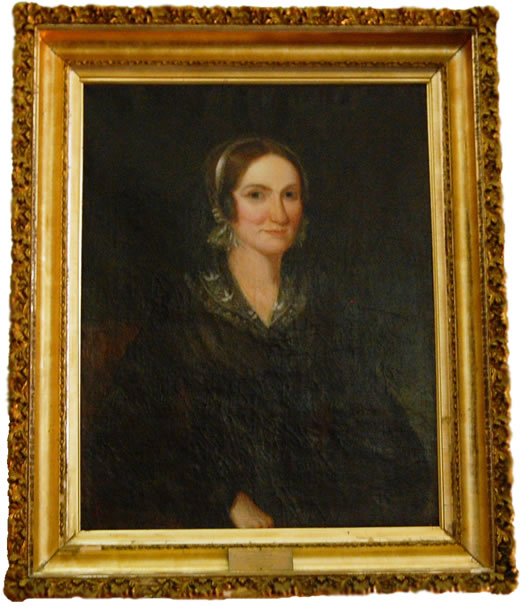
- Born: July 16, 1802; Wilmington
- Died: March 30, 1891 (aged 88)
- Spouse(s): Alexander Graydon, III
- Children: William Mordecai Graydon, Mary Ellen Graydon Sharpe

Jane Chambers McKinney Graydon (July 16, 1802 – March 30, 1891) was an abolitionist who served as a nurse during the American Civil War. In collaboration with Catharine Merrill, she organized a charitable society in 1867 that founded the Indianapolis Home for Friendless Women, the predecessor to the Indianapolis Retirement Home.

McKinney, who was born in Wilmington, Delaware in 1802, became an abolitionist as an adult. She married Alexander Graydon, an iron manufacturer, in 1822 and they moved to Indianapolis, Indiana, in 1843. She was also involved with the Presbyterian Church. During the American Civil War, she served as a nurse in Tennessee. With Catharine Merrill, who also served as a nurse during the war, Jane McKinney Graydon organized the charitable group that established the Indianapolis Home for Friendless Women in 1867. This Indianapolis women's shelter provided refuge to homeless women, as well as orphans and widows of soldiers. By the end of the nineteenth-century, it was caring for an estimated 400 to 500 people annually. The facility was renamed the Indianapolis Home for the Aged in 1936 and reorganized so that it could accept male residents; its name was changed to the Indianapolis Retirement Home in 1976.

As an abolitionist, her home was also reported to be a station in the Underground Railroad.
