= George Brown's Sons Cotton and Woolen Mill =

- U.S. National Register of Historic Places
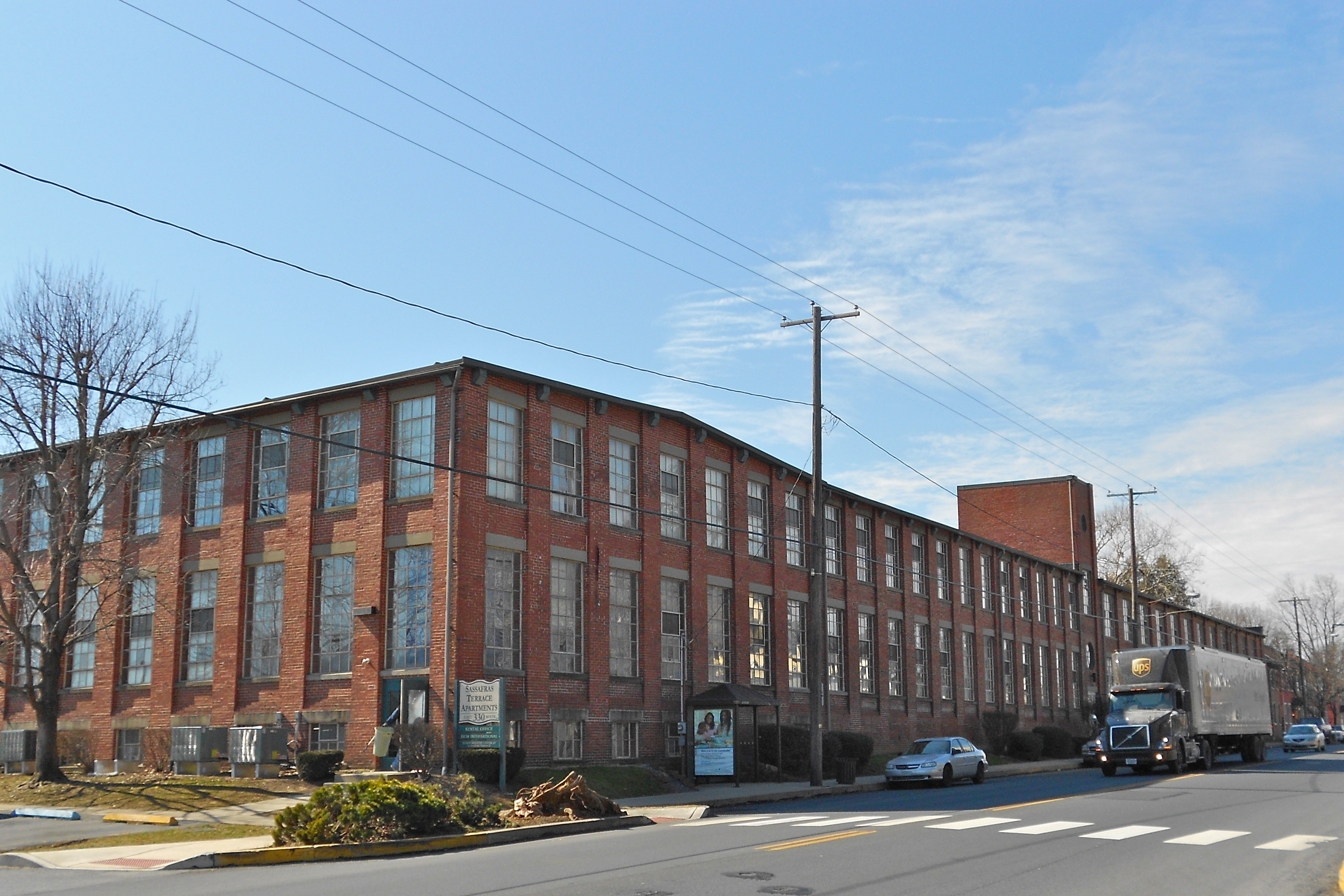
- George Brown's Sons Cotton and Woolen Mill, February 2012

- Location within Pennsylvania Location within the United States
- Location: 324-360 E. Main St., Mount Joy, Pennsylvania
- Coordinates: 40°6′32″N 76°29′47″W
- Area: less than one acre
- Built: 1883
- NRHP reference No.: 95000881
- Added to NRHP: July 21, 1995

George Brown's Sons Cotton and Woolen Mill, now known as the Sassafras Alley Apartments, is an historic mill complex which is located in Mount Joy, Lancaster County, Pennsylvania.

It was listed on the National Register of Historic Places in 1995.

== History and architectural features ==
This complex includes nine contributing buildings. They are identified as Building A through Building I, and date from the early nineteenth century to 1916. The buildings were converted to apartments between 1988 and 1991.
