= Central Hotel (Mount Joy, Pennsylvania) =

- U.S. National Register of Historic Places
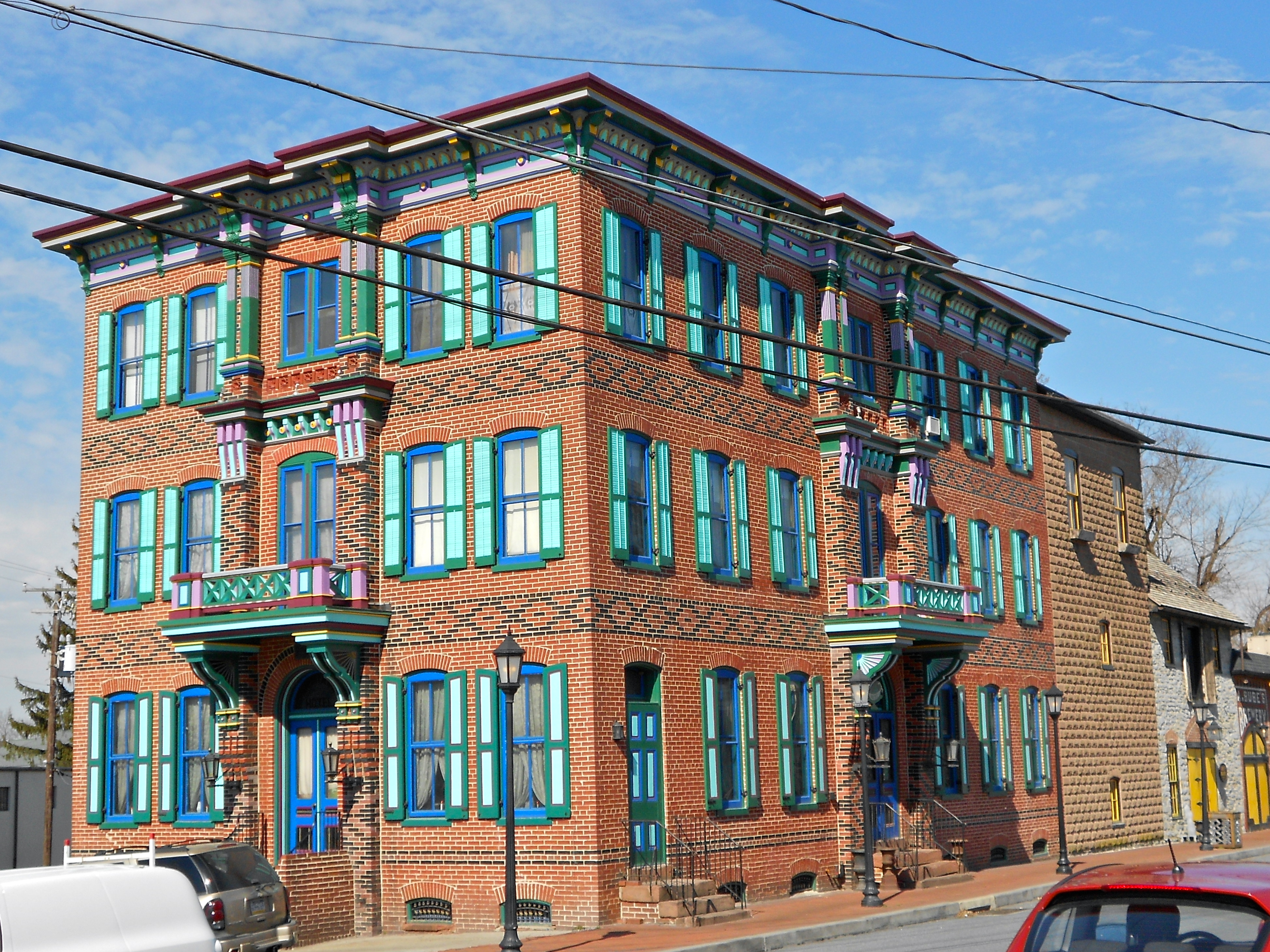
- Central Hotel, February 2012

- Location within Pennsylvania Location within the United States
- Location: 102 N. Market St., Mount Joy, Pennsylvania
- Coordinates: 40°6′41″N 76°30′12″W
- Area: less than one acre
- Built: 1859, 1880, 1893
- Architectural style: Late Victorian
- NRHP reference No.: 73001637
- Added to NRHP: June 4, 1973

Central Hotel and Bube's Brewery, are a historic hotel and brewery complex located at Mount Joy, Lancaster County, Pennsylvania. The brewery building was built in 1859, and consists of a 2 1/2-story, stone flat roofed building with a one-story, attached brick building. The stone portion features large, arched double entry doors. In 1880, Alois Bube built the Central Hotel. It is a three-story, flat roofed building with a wide overhanging cornice and elaborate decoration in the Late Victorian style. The original third-floor had a mansard roof, but it was destroyed by fire in 1893, and replaced with the present configuration. The two buildings are connected by a three-story ice house.

It was listed on the National Register of Historic Places on June 4, 1973.

On April 25, 2012, the complex was featured in an episode of Ghost Hunters on Syfy.

== See also ==
- Contributing property
- Cultural landscape
- Historic preservation
- Keeper of the Register
- List of heritage registers
- Property type (National Register of Historic Places)
- United States National Register of Historic Places listings
- State Historic Preservation Office
