= East Donegal Township, Pennsylvania =

Township in Pennsylvania, US

Coordinates: 40°03′30″N 76°37′35″W

- Township
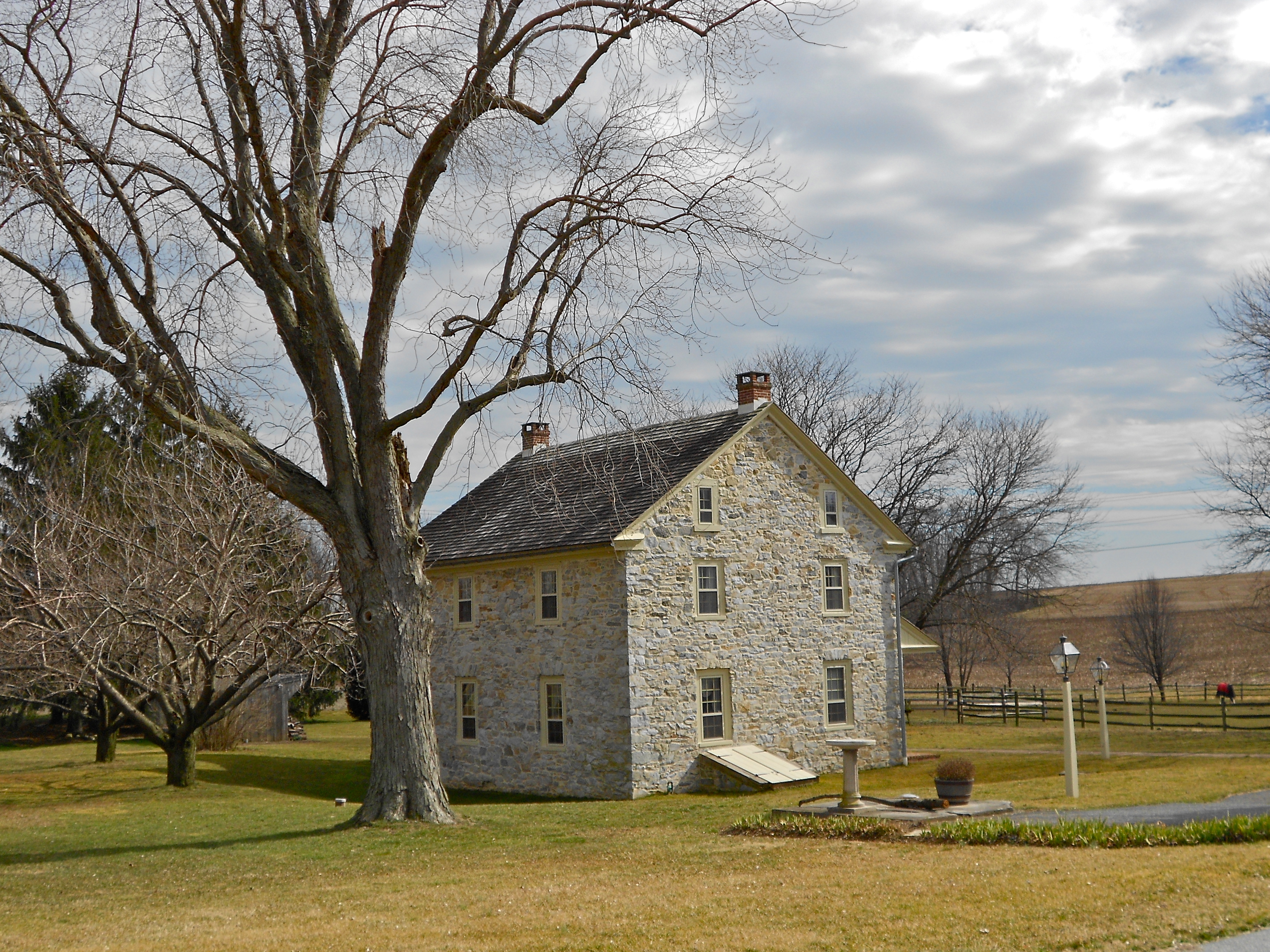
- Byers-Muma House

- Seal

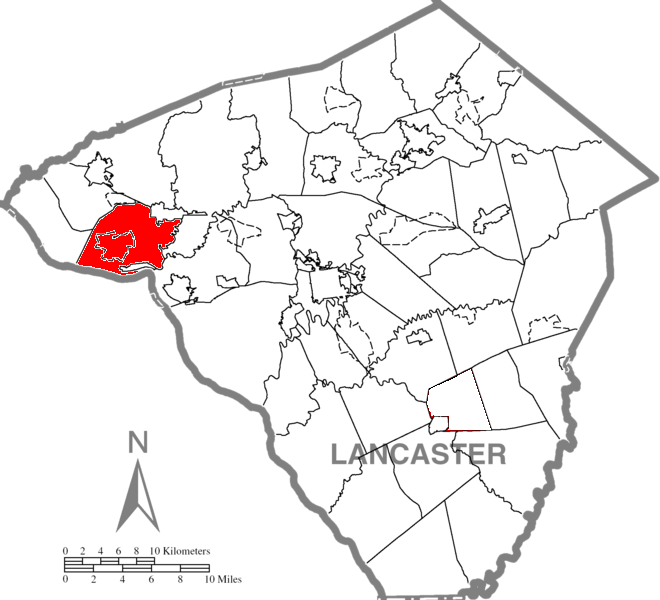
- Map of Lancaster County, Pennsylvania highlighting East Donegal Township

- Map of Lancaster County, Pennsylvania
- Country: United States
- State: Pennsylvania
- County: Lancaster
- Settled: 1716
- Incorporated: 1838

Government
  - Type: Board of Supervisors
  - Chairman of Board: Allen D. Esbenshade (R)

Area
  - Total: 23.76 sq mi (61.53 km^{2})
  - Land: 21.43 sq mi (55.51 km^{2})
  - Water: 2.32 sq mi (6.02 km^{2})

Population (2020)
  - Total: 8,690 ▲
  - Estimate (2021): 8,660
  - Density: 388/sq mi (149.8/km^{2})
- Time zone: UTC-5 (Eastern (EST))
  - Summer (DST): UTC-4 (EDT)
- Area code: 717
- FIPS code: 42-071-21032
- Website: eastdonegaltwp.com

East Donegal Township is a township in northwestern Lancaster County, Pennsylvania, United States. At the 2020 census, the population was 8,690.

== History ==
It is named after County Donegal, Ireland. The original township of Donegal was organized by the court of Chester County in 1722, and was one of the two townships which composed Lancaster County at the time of its erection in 1729. On June 24, 1838, a division was effected, whereby the old township was constituted into two townships, to be separately and distinctly recognized as East Donegal and West Donegal.

The settlers of East Donegal were of Scots-Irish descent and were primarily farmers who were drawn to the area by the rich soils and plentiful streams. Thus the abundant produce provided by the land was able to be made into flour by the many mills which sprang up in the area.

Early settlers, Arthur Patterson and others, organized a Presbyterian Church at Donegal in 1726, and erected the old church edifice at that time. The first three pastors of it were from Scotland. Bartram Galbraith, grandson of James Galbraith, was Lieutenant for Lancaster County, the first three years of the Revolution, and many members of that family served in various official positions, as also did Alexander Lowrey and several of that family.

The Chickies Historic District, Donegal Presbyterian Church Complex, Grove Mansion, Donegal Mills Plantation, Byers-Muma House, and Cameron Estate are listed on the National Register of Historic Places.

== Geography ==
According to the U.S. Census Bureau, the township has a total area of 24.1 square miles (62 km^{2}), of which 21.8 square miles (56 km^{2}) are land and 2.3 square miles (6.0 km^{2}), or 9.46%, are water.

The boundaries of the township are north by Mount Joy, northeast by Rapho, east by West Hempfield, south by the Susquehanna River, and west by Conoy and West Donegal. Little Chiques Creek flows along the eastern boundary. The borough of Marietta, a separate municipality, is on the southern border of the township and occupies land formerly belonging to it. Unincorporated communities within the township include Donegal Heights, Donegal Springs, Maytown, Rowenna, and part of Chickies.

== Demographics ==
Historical population
Census	Pop.	Note	%±
2000	5,405		—
2010	7,755		43.5%
2020	8,690		12.1%
2021 (est.)	8,660		−0.3%
U.S. Decennial Census

As of the census of 2000, there were 5,405 people, 1,941 households, and 1,554 families residing in the township. The population density was 247.7 inhabitants per square mile (95.6/km^{2}). There were 2,010 housing units at an average density of 92.1 units per square mile (35.6 units/km^{2}). The racial makeup of the township was 97.19% White, 0.76% Black or African American, 0.06% Native American, 0.57% Asian, 0.04% Pacific Islander, 0.65% from other races, and 0.74% from two or more races. 1.78% of the population were Hispanic or Latino of any race.

There were 1,941 households, out of which 38.9% had children under the age of 18 living with them, 70.1% were married couples living together, 6.6% had a female householder with no husband present, and 19.9% were non-families. 16.1% of all households were made up of individuals, and 4.8% had someone living alone who was 65 years of age or older. The average household size was 2.78 and the average family size was 3.13.

In the township the population was spread out, with 27.9% under the age of 18, 7.9% from 18 to 24, 32.6% from 25 to 44, 22.5% from 45 to 64, and 9.1% who were 65 years of age or older. The median age was 34 years. For every 100 females, there were 100.7 males. For every 100 females age 18 and over, there were 98.3 males.

The median income for a household in the township was $55,414, and the median income for a family was $58,117. Males had a median income of $35,901 versus $26,071 for females. The per capita income for the township was $20,488. About 0.4% of families and 1.5% of the population were below the poverty line, including 0.6% of those under age 18 and 2.7% of those age 65 or over.

== Notable person ==
- John Andrew Hiestand (1824-1890), former U.S. Representative
