= Nissly Swiss Chocolate Company =

- U.S. National Register of Historic Places
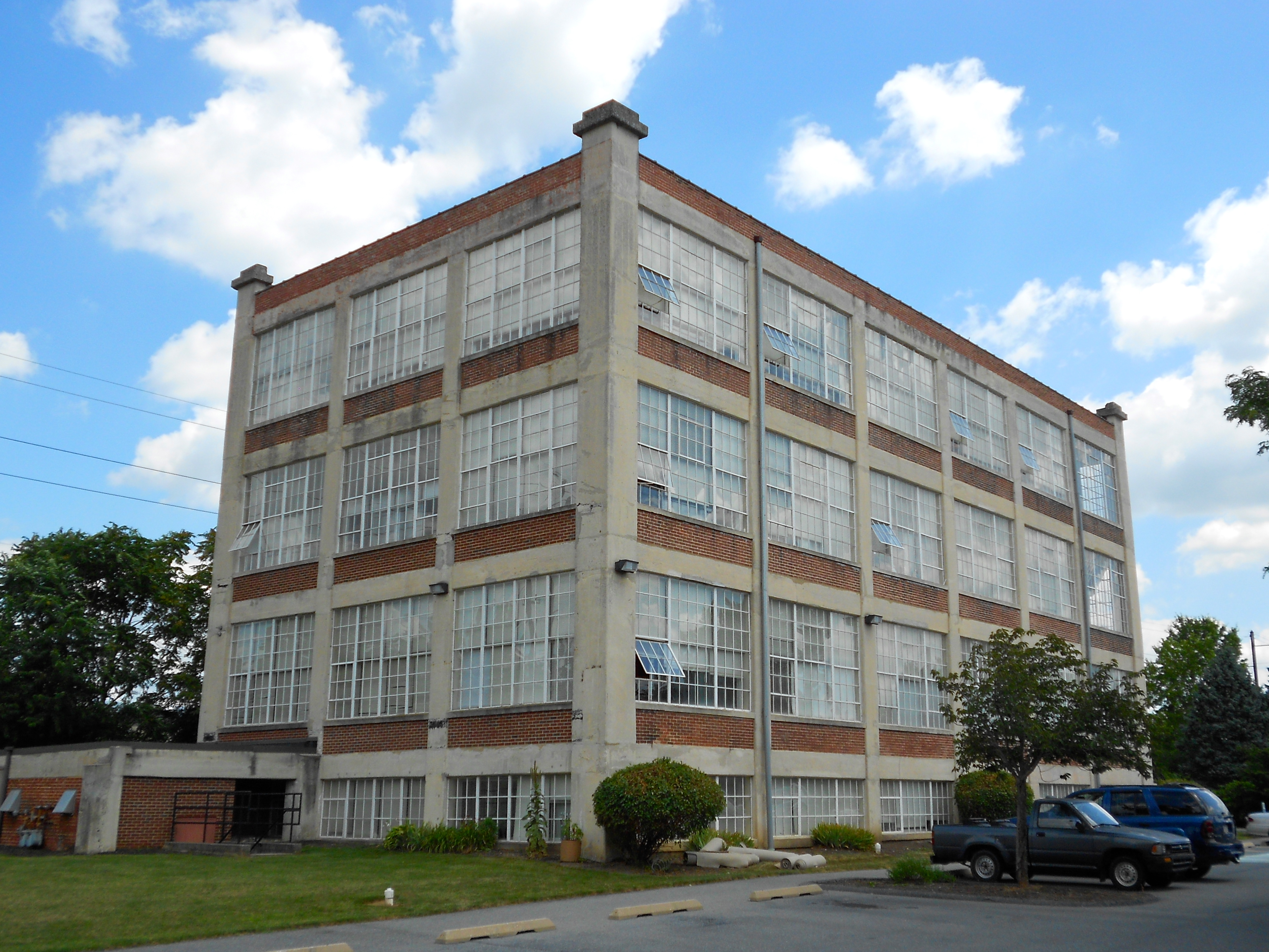
- Main factory building

- Location within Pennsylvania Location within the United States
- Location: 951 Wood St., Mount Joy, Pennsylvania
- Coordinates: 40°6′48″N 76°31′38″W
- Area: 0 acres (0 ha)
- Built: 1920
- NRHP reference No.: 96000709
- Added to NRHP: June 28, 1996

Nissly Swiss Chocolate Company is a historic factory complex located at Mount Joy, Lancaster County, Pennsylvania. The complex includes two contributing buildings. They are the three-story, three-bay-by-six-bay factory building and the one-story four-bay-by-three-bay, L-shaped, boiler room building. The buildings were both built in 1920. It was used to produce milk chocolates until 1929.

It was listed on the National Register of Historic Places in 1995.
