= Julia Graydon Sharpe =

American artist and writer

- Born: 1857; Indianapolis, Indiana
- Died: 1939 (aged 81–82); Crown Hill Cemetery and Arboretum, Indianapolis, Indiana, U.S.
- Resting place: Section 3, Lot 16; 39.8178581°N 86.1728787°W
- Education: Indiana School of Art
- Parents: Joseph Kinne (father); Mary Ellen (Graydon) Sharpe (mother)

Julia Graydon Sharpe (1857–1939) was an American female portrait artist. During her lifetime, Sharpe practiced art, literature, and music. She focused specifically on painting landscapes, portraiture, and figure work, the latter two being her most popular.

== Early life ==
Julia Graydon Sharpe was born in Indianapolis, Indiana. She was the daughter of Joseph Kinne and Mary Ellen (Graydon) Sharpe. Her father was a leather merchant and real estate operator. As a young girl, Sharpe attended local private schools in Indianapolis as well as the Chegaray Institute, in Philadelphia, for instruction in voice. She returned to Indianapolis at age twenty-one and enrolled in Love and Gookins' First Indiana School of Art from 1878 to 1880. Sharpe's art career underwent a hiatus as her father struggled through the depression of the 1870s, and she pursued social activities.

== Art education and training ==
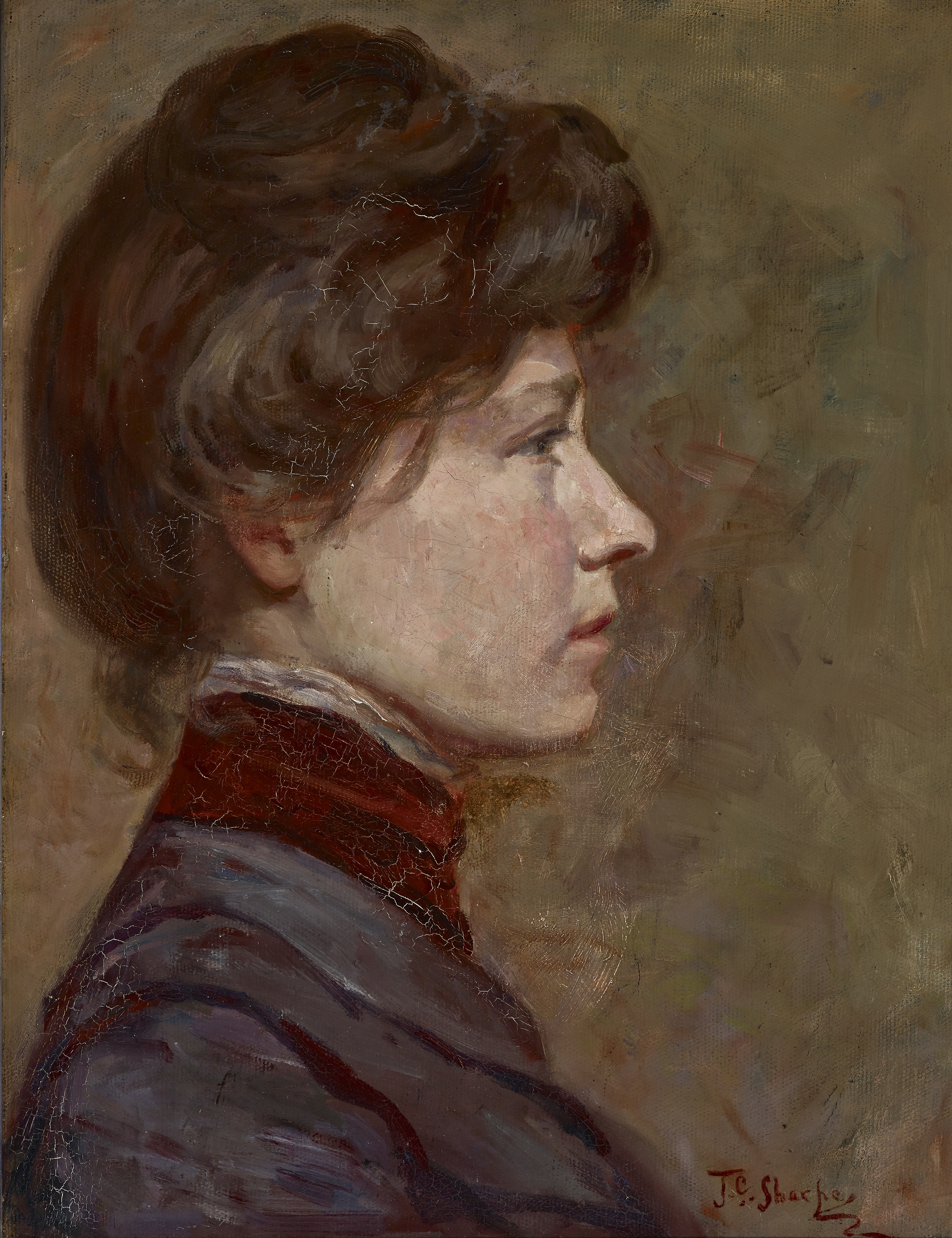
Portrait of a Young Woman painted by Julia Graydon Sharpe before 1900.

Sharpe started to seriously pursue art in 1894 when she began studying at the second Indiana School of Art under both William Forsythe and T. C. Steele. In 1896, she embarked on sketching expeditions to Corydon and Cedar Farm alongside Forsyth. In the winter of 1896- 1897, Sharpe studied at the Art Students League and at William Merritt Chase's School of Art, both in New York. During this time, she studied alongside artists such as H. Siddons Mowbray, Kenyon Cox, Walter Appleton Clarke, and Augustus Saint-Gaudens. In the fall of 1898, Sharpe took her six-year-old niece with her on a sketching trip to the mountains of West Virginia. When she returned to Indianapolis in 1907, Sharpe continued studying art with J. Ottis Adams at the John Herron Art Institute in Indianapolis and Will Vawter in Brown County, Indiana. Although not an official member of the "Hoosier Group," Sharpe studied under three of its well known members: Steele, and Adams.
