= Winfred Trexler Root =

American historian and educator

Winfred Trexler Root (March 9, 1879 – December 8, 1947) was an American historian and educator. Root was born in Mount Joy, Pennsylvania and received his undergraduate education at Princeton University. He earned a Ph.D. in history from the University of Pennsylvania in 1908, thereafter joining the faculty of the University of Wisconsin. In 1925 he accepted a position as head of the history department at the University of Iowa, succeeding Arthur M. Schlesinger, and would remain there until his death. George L. Mosse, who was a history professor at Iowa during Root's tenure, described him as a "benevolent dictator". In 1930 Root was elected to the Council of the American Historical Association.

Root was married and had one daughter.
