= Maytown, Pennsylvania =

Unincorporated community in Pennsylvania, US

- Census-designated place
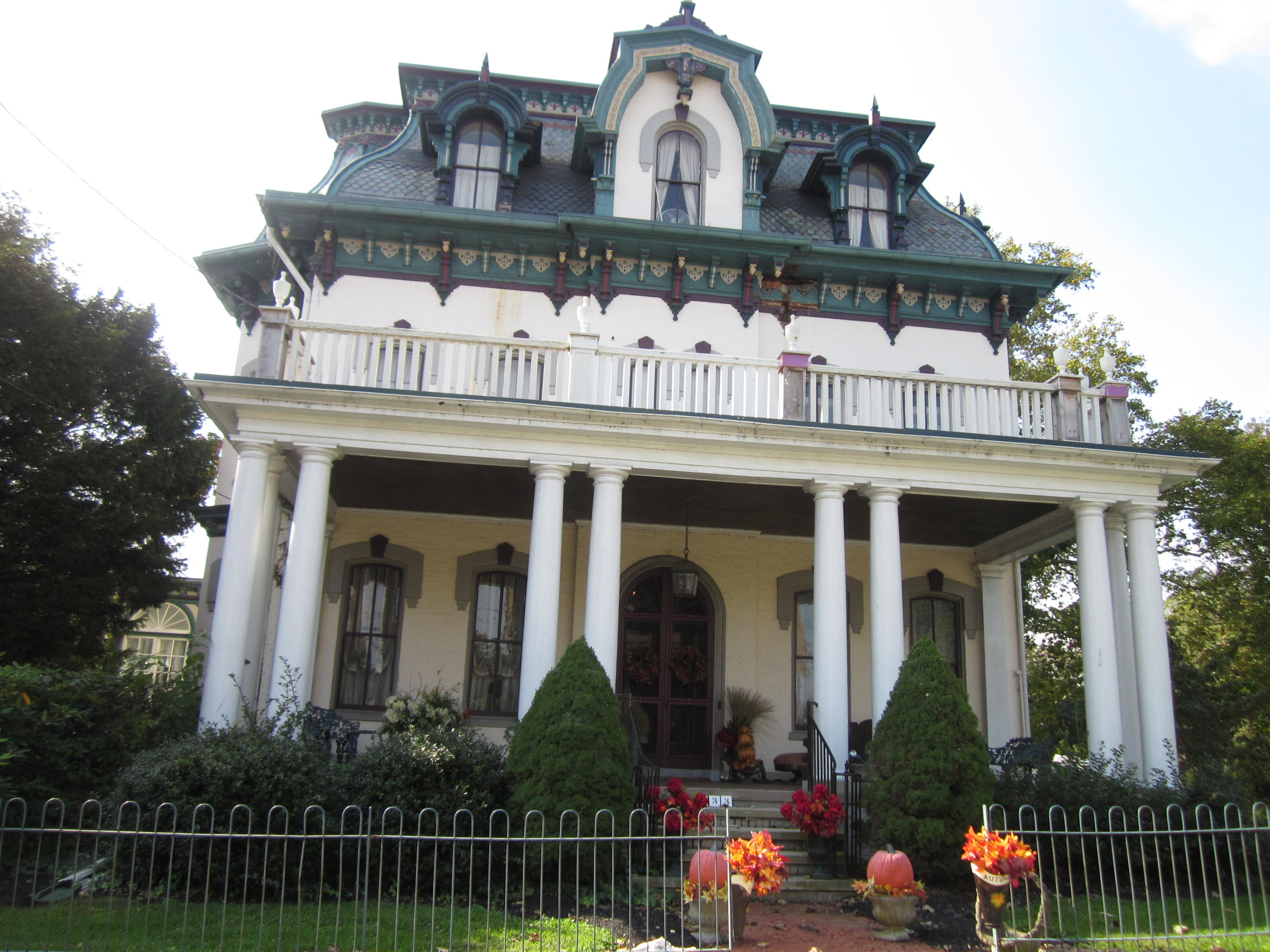
- Grove Mansion (built 1882–1887)

- Location within Pennsylvania Location within the United States
- Coordinates: 40°4′31″N 76°34′55″W
- Country: United States
- State: Pennsylvania
- County: Lancaster
- Township: East Donegal

Area
  - Total: 3.68 sq mi (9.53 km^{2})
  - Land: 3.68 sq mi (9.53 km^{2})
  - Water: 0 sq mi (0.00 km^{2})
- Elevation: 460 ft (140 m)

Population (2020)
  - Total: 4,098
  - Density: 1,113.6/sq mi (429.98/km^{2})
- Time zone: UTC-5 (Eastern (EST))
  - Summer (DST): UTC-4 (EDT)
- ZIP Code: 17547
- FIPS code: 42-48224
- GNIS feature ID: 1180586

Maytown is an unincorporated community and census-designated place (CDP) in Lancaster County, Pennsylvania, United States. The population was 4,098 at the 2020 census.

== History ==
Maytown is noted as the birthplace of 19th-century politician Simon Cameron, who served in the Cabinet of President Abraham Lincoln.

The Grove Mansion was listed on the National Register of Historic Places in 1983. William H. Strayer, born in Maytown in 1847, earned the Medal of Honor on May 22, 1872, along with William F. Cody and two others.

== Geography ==
Maytown is located in western Lancaster County, in the western part of East Donegal Township. Pennsylvania Route 743 (Maytown Road / South River Street) passes through the center of town, leading north 6 miles (10 km) to Elizabethtown and south 3 miles (5 km) to Marietta. Pennsylvania Route 441 forms part of the southern edge of the Maytown CDP; it leads northwest 14 miles (23 km) to Middletown and southeast 6 miles (10 km) to Columbia. Lancaster, the county seat, is 15 miles (24 km) east of Maytown via Routes 441 and 23.

According to the U.S. Census Bureau, Maytown has a total area of 3.7 square miles (9.5 km^{2}), of which 0.7 acres (2,999 m^{2}), or 0.03%, are water. The community drains east and west to unnamed direct tributaries of the Susquehanna River.

== Demographics ==
Historical population
Census	Pop.	Note	%±
2020	4,098		—
U.S. Decennial Census

=== 2020 census ===
As of the 2020 census, Maytown had a population of 4,098. The median age was 37.3 years. 25.1% of residents were under the age of 18 and 13.4% of residents were 65 years of age or older. For every 100 females there were 96.1 males, and for every 100 females age 18 and over there were 92.5 males age 18 and over.

88.9% of residents lived in urban areas, while 11.1% lived in rural areas.

There were 1,439 households in Maytown, of which 38.2% had children under the age of 18 living in them. Of all households, 60.1% were married-couple households, 11.1% were households with a male householder and no spouse or partner present, and 20.8% were households with a female householder and no spouse or partner present. About 18.6% of all households were made up of individuals and 6.6% had someone living alone who was 65 years of age or older.

There were 1,475 housing units, of which 2.4% were vacant. The homeowner vacancy rate was 0.3% and the rental vacancy rate was 5.8%.

Racial composition as of the 2020 census
Race	Number	Percent
White	3,641	88.8%
Black or African American	117	2.9%
American Indian and Alaska Native	1	0.0%
Asian	15	0.4%
Native Hawaiian and Other Pacific Islander	1	0.0%
Some other race	92	2.2%
Two or more races	231	5.6%
Hispanic or Latino (of any race)	262	6.4%

=== 2000 census ===
At the 2000 census there were 2,604 people, 917 households, and 751 families living in the CDP. The population density was 709.4 inhabitants per square mile (273.9/km^{2}). There were 962 housing units at an average density of 262.1 units per square mile (101.2 units/km^{2}). The racial makeup of the CDP was 97.58% White, 0.69% African American, 0.08% Native American, 0.69% Asian, 0.27% from other races, and 0.69% from two or more races. Hispanic or Latino of any race were 1.96%.

There were 917 households, 45.1% had children under the age of 18 living with them, 70.3% were married couples living together, 8.2% had a female householder with no husband present, and 18.1% were non-families. 13.7% of households were made up of individuals, and 3.5% were one person aged 65 or older. The average household size was 2.83 and the average family size was 3.13.

The age distribution was 29.3% under the age of 18, 8.1% from 18 to 24, 37.7% from 25 to 44, 19.2% from 45 to 64, and 5.6% 65 or older. The median age was 31 years. For every 100 females, there were 99.4 males. For every 100 females age 18 and over, there were 96.0 males.

The median household income was $50,122 and the median family income was $55,216. Males had a median income of $36,761 versus $25,510 for females. The per capita income for the CDP was $18,181. None of the families and 1.0% of the population were living below the poverty line, including no under eighteens and 2.8% of those over 64.

== Education ==
Maytown is part of the Donegal School District, which currently houses four schools. Grades K-2 attend Donegal Primary School. Grades 3-6 attend Donegal Intermediate School. Donegal Junior High School holds grades 7 and 8 while Donegal High School holds grades 9–12. Prior to renovations, Donegal School District had several other schools including the historic Maytown Elementary School. Maytown Elementary School was the oldest operational elementary school in Pennsylvania before being closed in 2012.

== Notable people ==
- James Cameron (1800–1861), Union colonel
- Simon Cameron (1799–1889), United States Senator from Pennsylvania

== Gallery ==
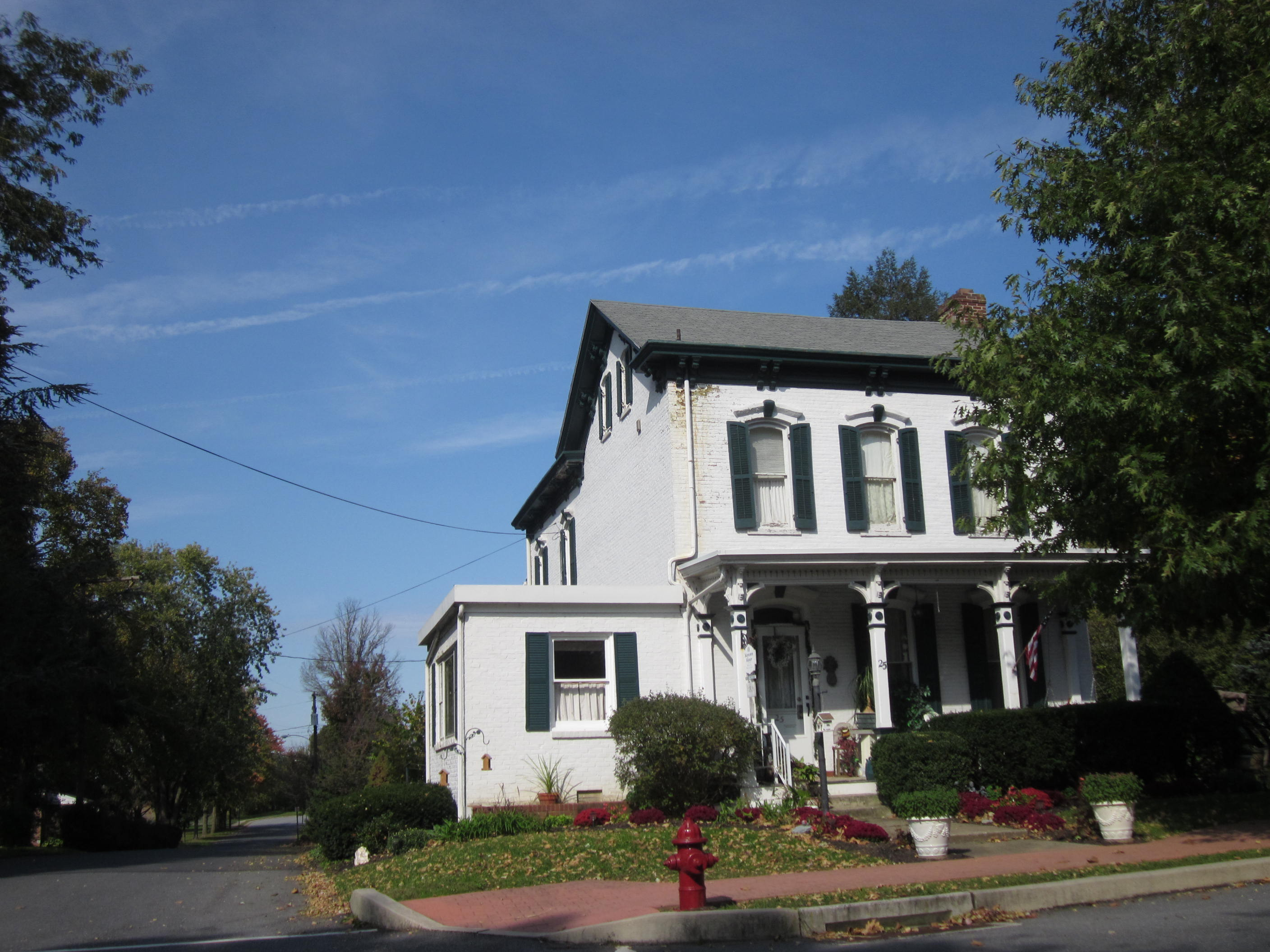

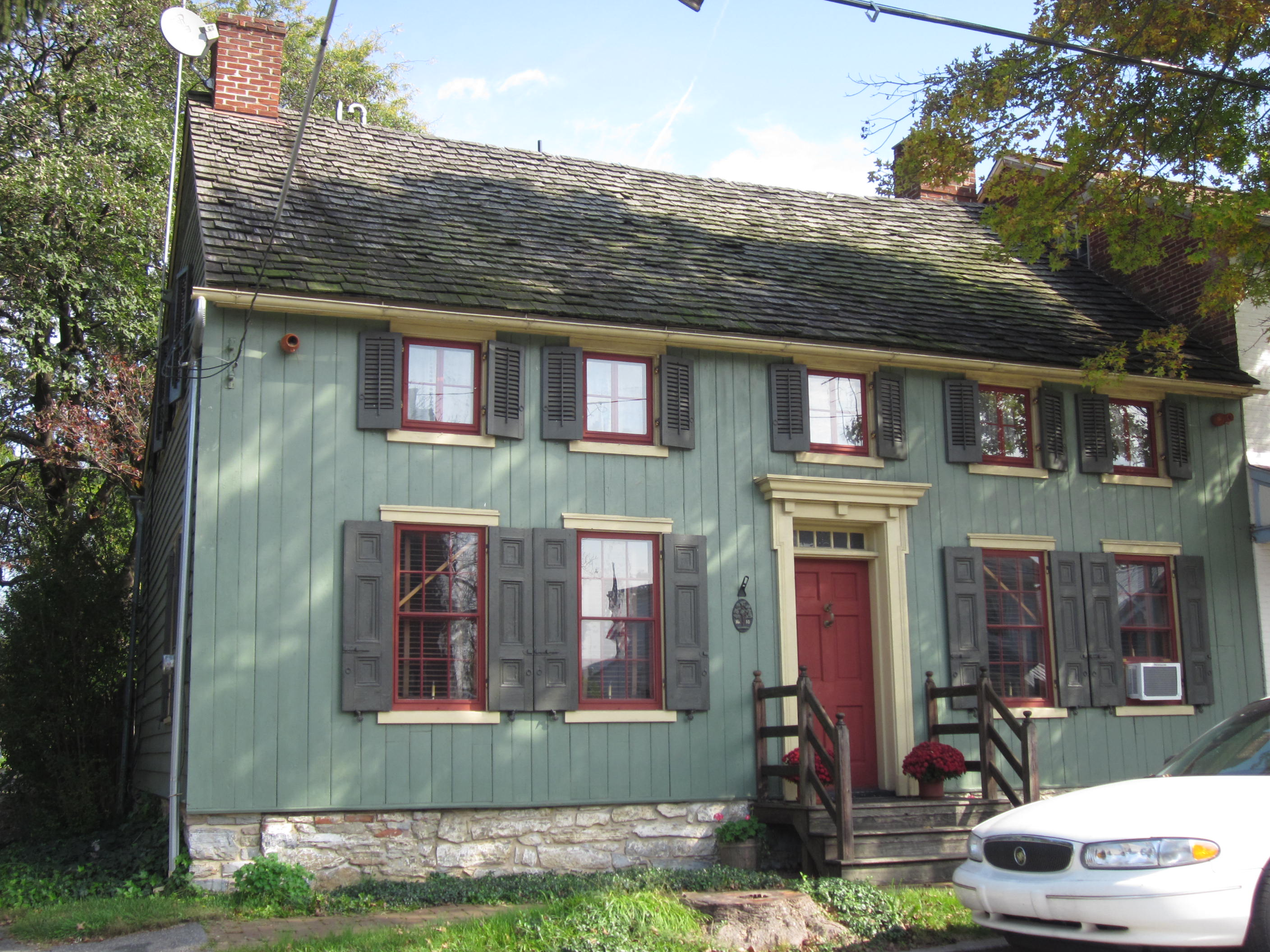

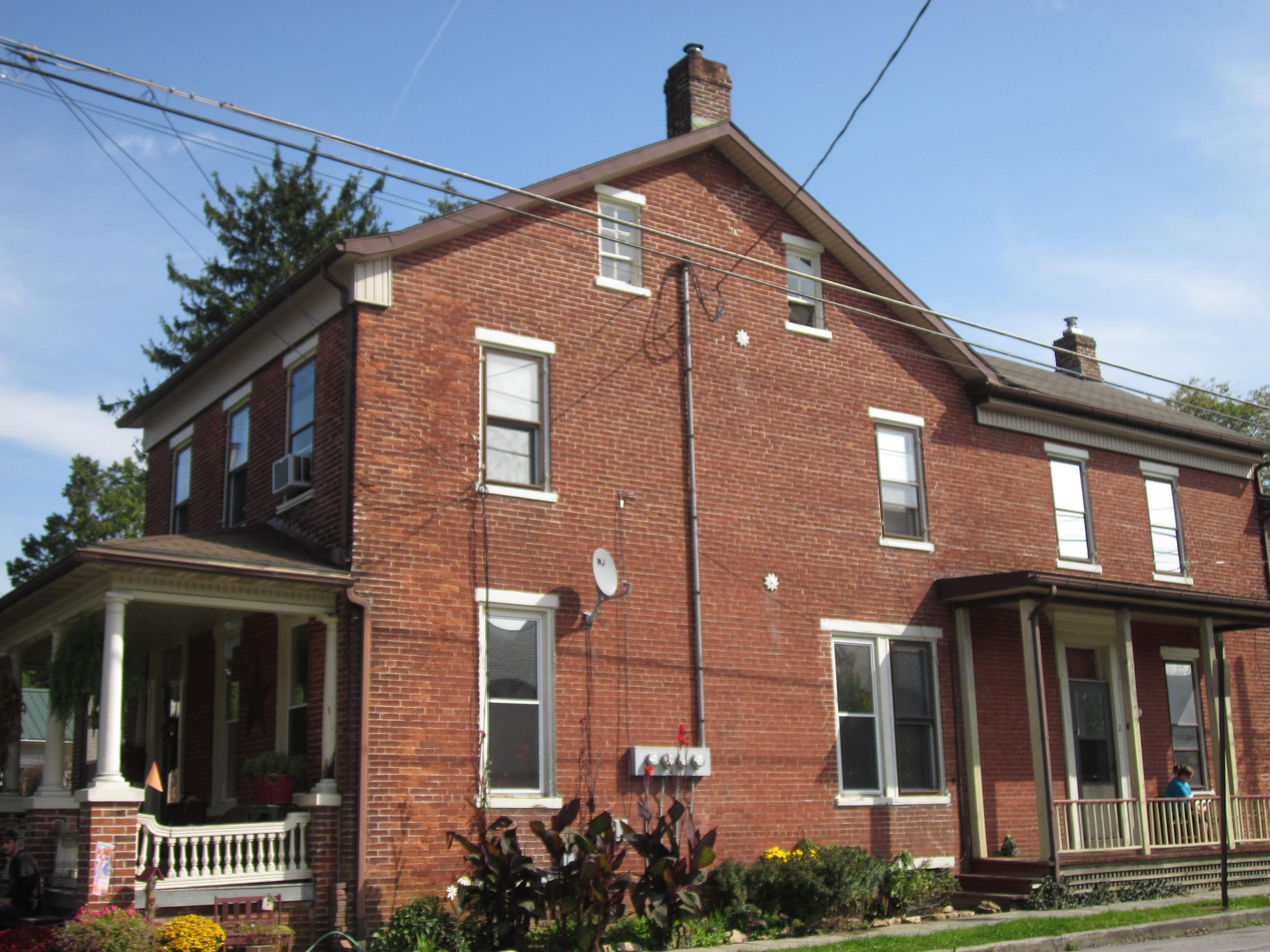
