= Donegal Presbyterian Church Complex =

Historic church in Pennsylvania, United States

- U.S. National Register of Historic Places
- U.S. Historic district
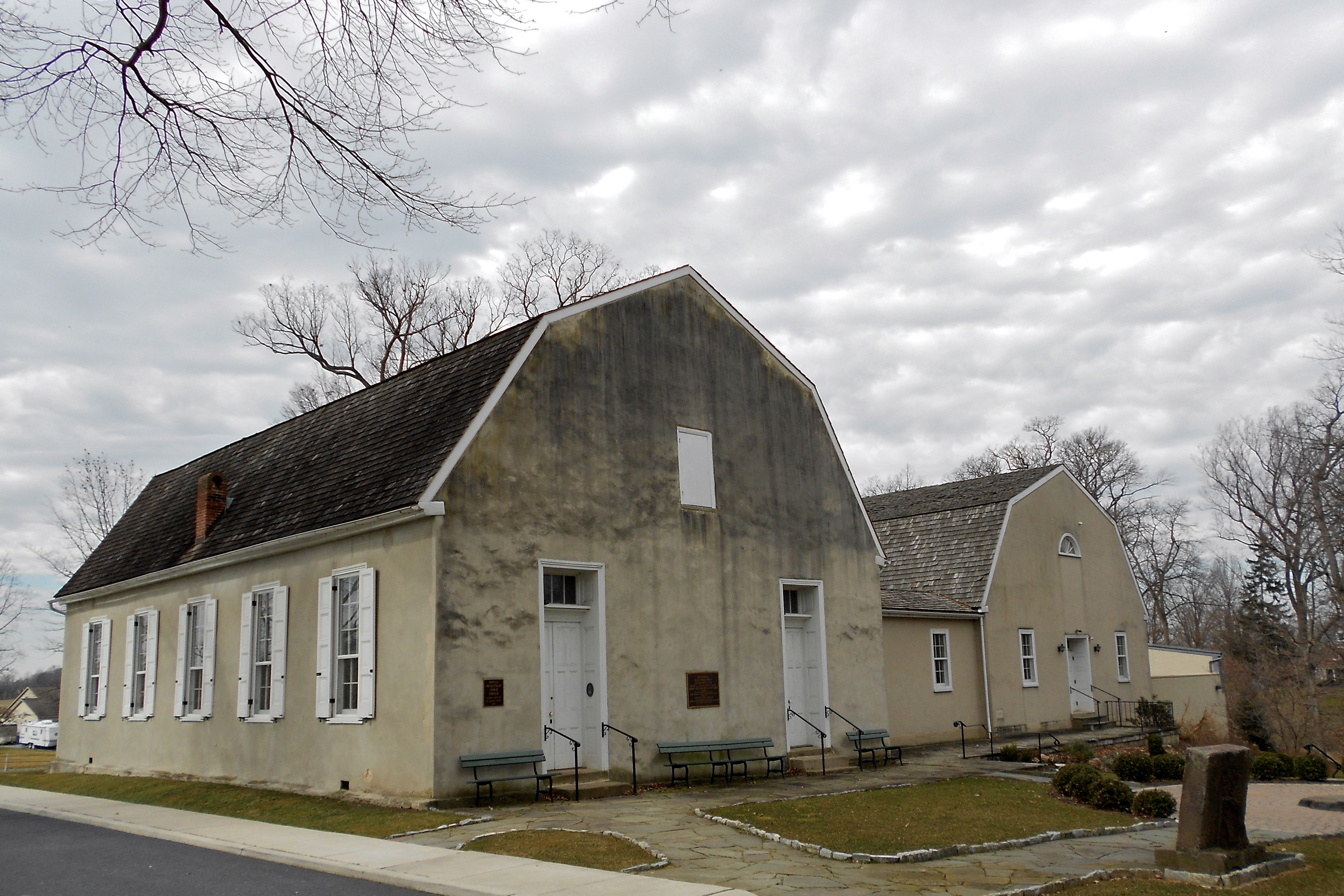
- The original church is in front.

- Location within Pennsylvania Location within the United States
- Location: Donegal Springs Rd., East Donegal Township, Pennsylvania
- Coordinates: 40°6′4″N 76°34′0″W
- Area: 7.5 acres (3.0 ha)
- Built: 1732
- Architectural style: Federal
- NRHP reference No.: 85001482
- Added to NRHP: July 02, 1985

Donegal Presbyterian Church Complex is an historic Presbyterian church complex on Donegal Springs Road in East Donegal Township, Lancaster County, Pennsylvania. The church was built in 1732, and is a 1 1/2-story, three-bay-by-five bay, stuccoed stone building with a gambrel roof.

It was listed on the National Register of Historic Places in 1985.

== History and architectural features ==
The chapel underwent a remodeling in 1851. The adjacent cemetery is enclosed in a rough-hewn stone wall built in 1791. The property also includes the William Kerr Study House, a 1 1/2-story, five-bay brick dwelling originally built in 1810 and expanded in the early 20th century. The building was restored in 1976.

== Notable burials ==
- Richard A. Snyder (1910-1992), Pennsylvania state senator

== Gallery ==
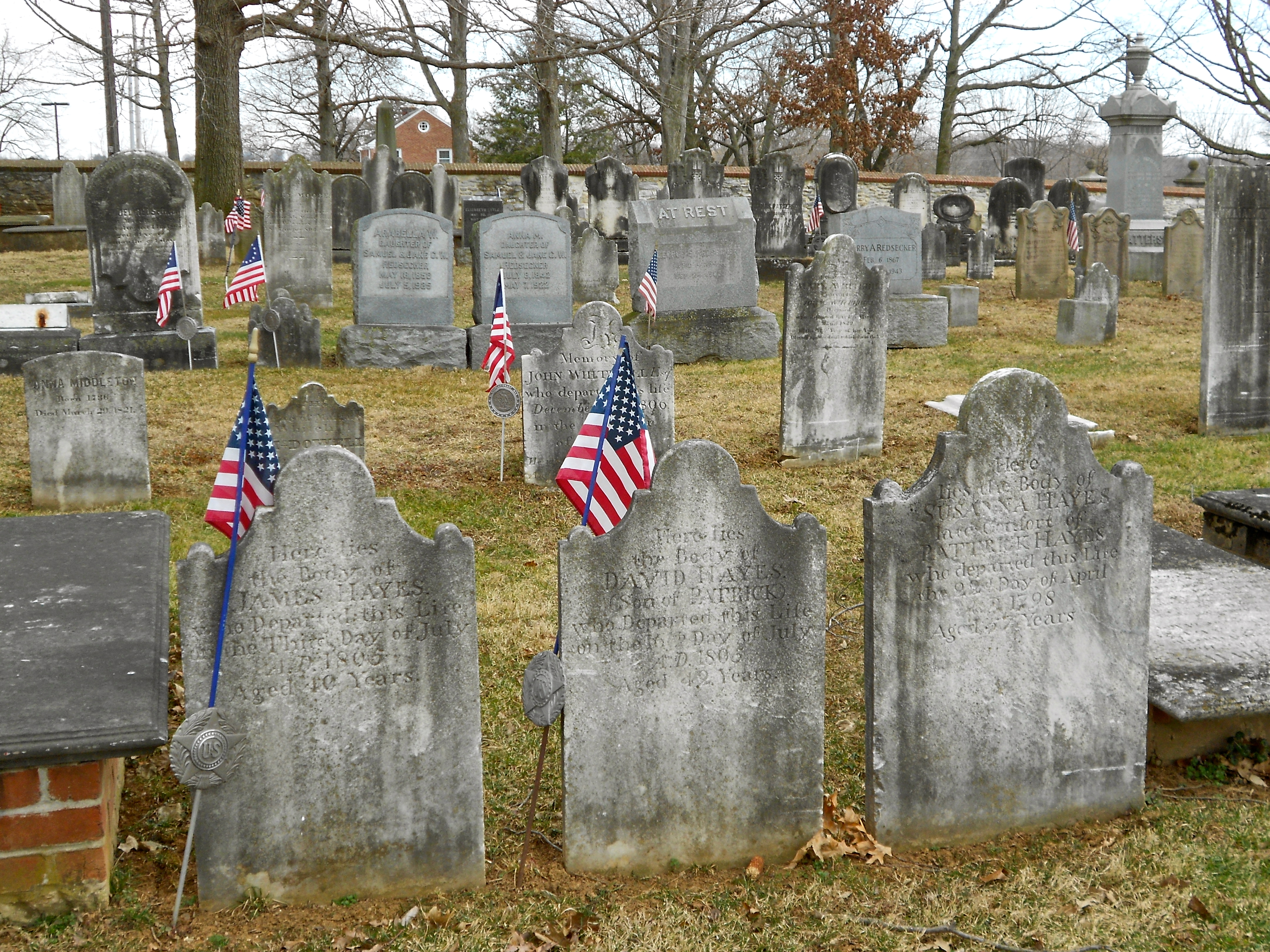
Cemetery

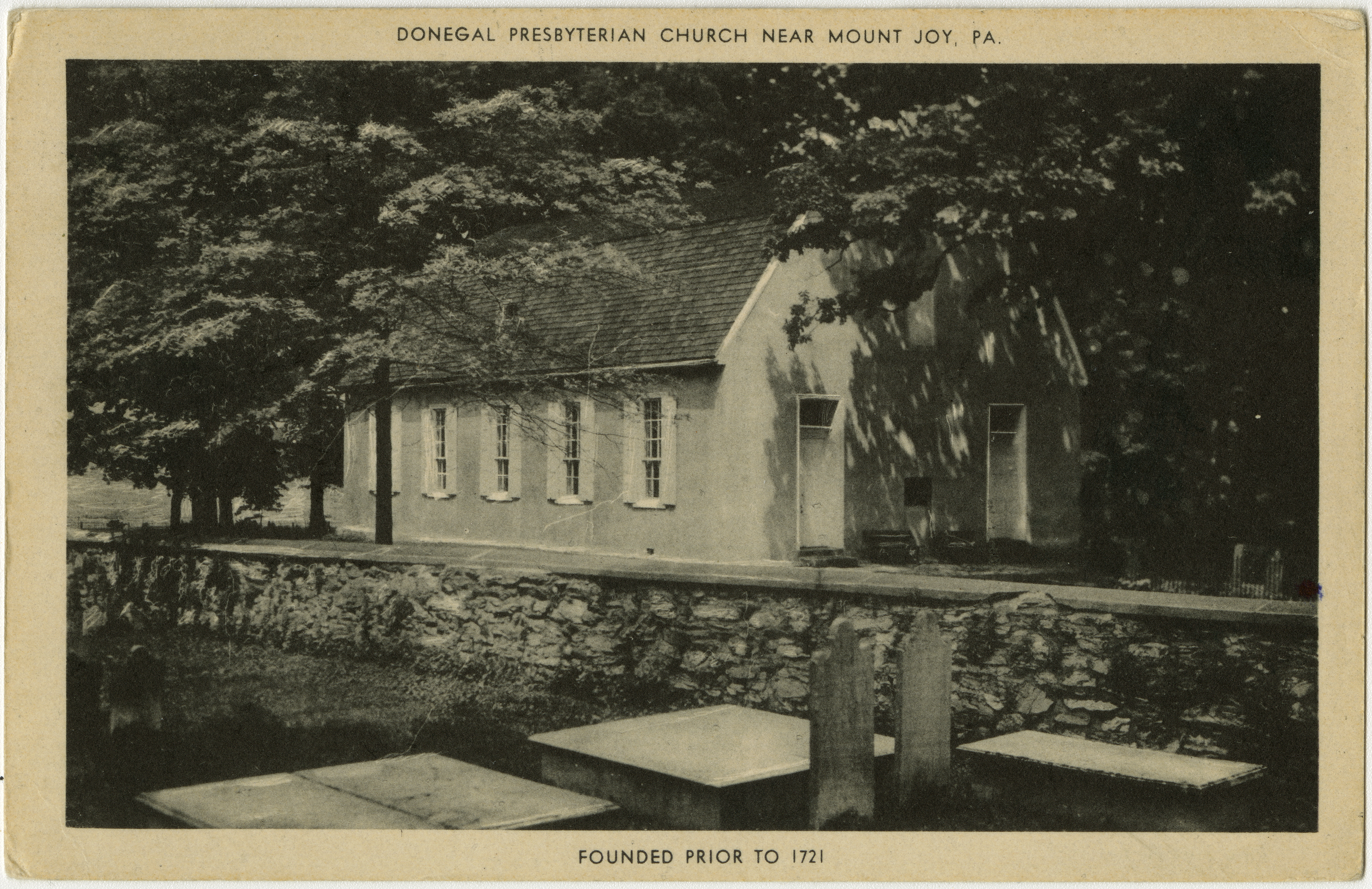
Church and cemetery on an old postcard

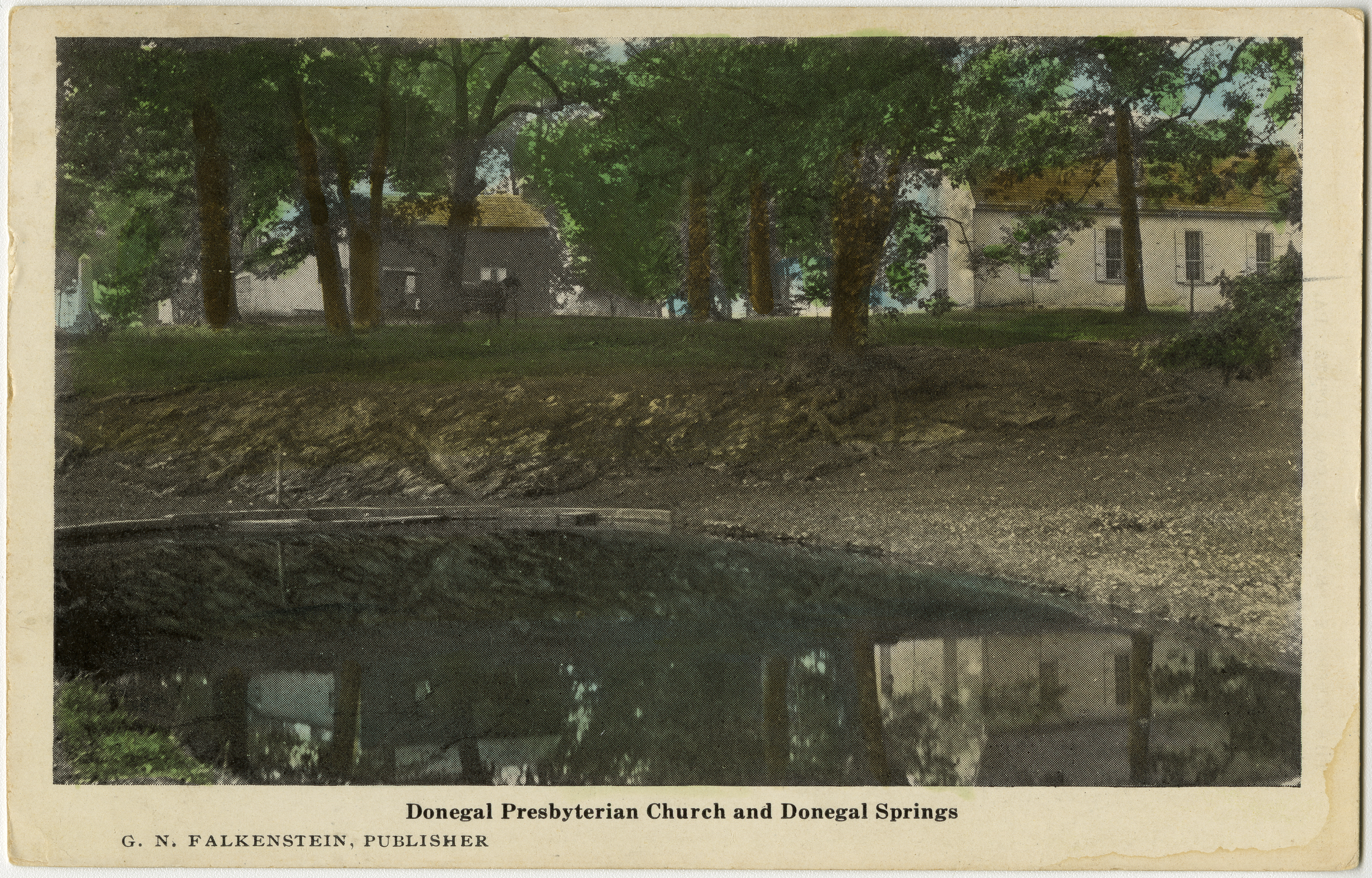
Church and Donegal Springs
