= Chiques Creek =

Coordinates: 40.12248°N 76.45806°W

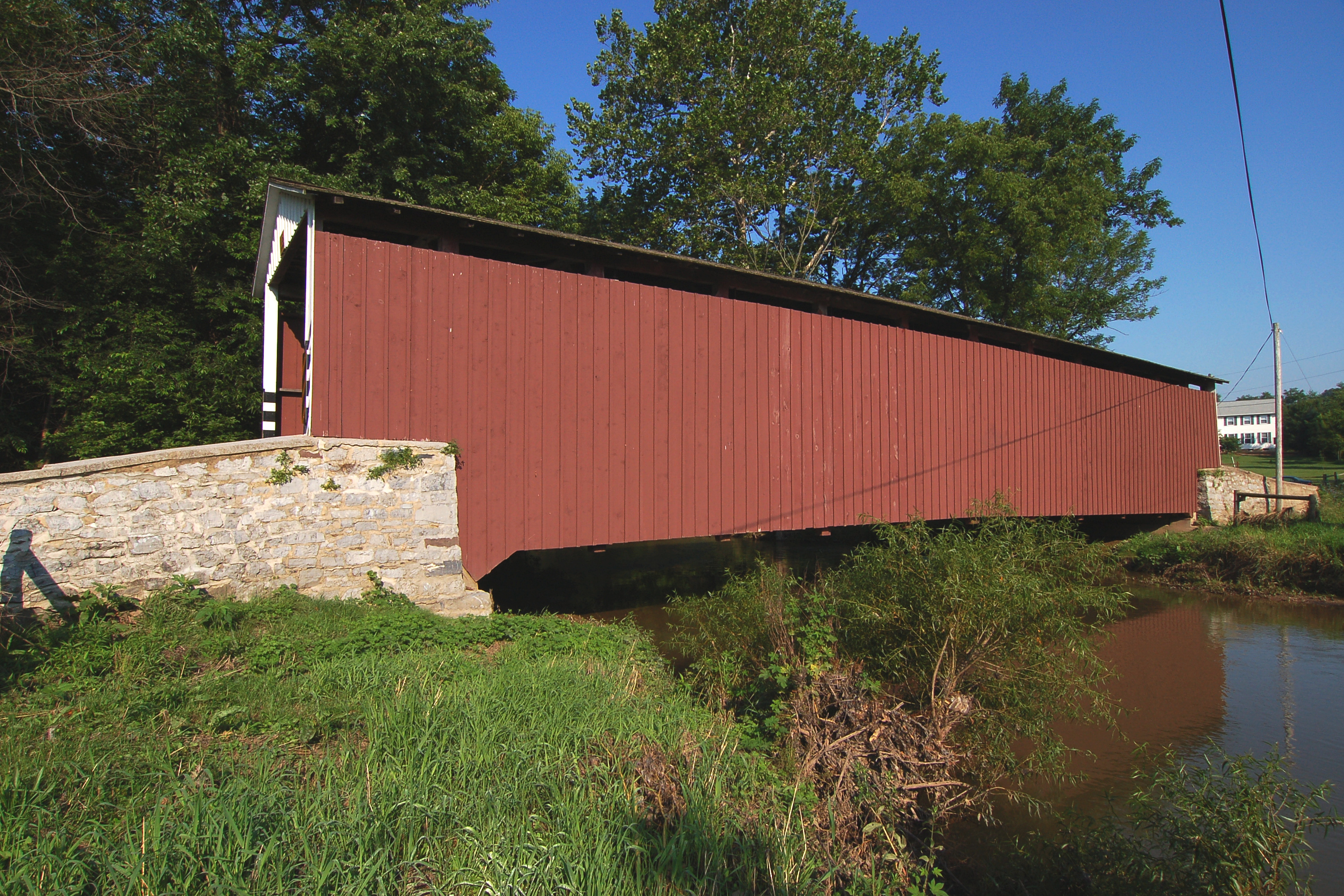
- Kauffman's Distillery Covered Bridge spans Chiques Creek in Lancaster County, Pennsylvania

Location
- Country: Lebanon and Lancaster Counties, Pennsylvania, United States

Physical characteristics
- Source
  - location: Mount Gretna Heights, Pennsylvania
  - elevation: 1,100 feet (340 m)
- Mouth
  - location: Susquehanna River at Marietta, Pennsylvania
  - elevation: 230 feet (70 m)
- Length: 31.6 mi (50.9 km)
- Basin size: 126 mi^{2} (330 km^{2})

Chiques Creek (known as Chickies Creek until 2002) is a 31.6-mile-long (50.9 km) tributary of the Susquehanna River in Lebanon and Lancaster counties, Pennsylvania in the United States.

The source is at an elevation of 1,100 feet (340 m) near Mount Gretna Heights in Lebanon County. The mouth is the confluence with the Susquehanna River at an elevation of 230 feet (70 m) at Marietta in Lancaster County.

== Name ==
The name of the creek comes from the Lenape Chiquesalunga, meaning "place of crayfish".

The United States Geological Survey Board on Geographic Names has made three official decisions on the name of the creek, deciding it was Chickies Creek in 1896 and 1916 before changing it to Chiques Creek in 2002. The USGS Geographic Names Information System recognizes the following thirteen variant names for the creek: Big Chickies Creek, Big Chiques Creek, Big Chiquesalunga Creek, Chickesalapga Creek, Chickeswalungo Creek, Chickies Creek, Chickisalungo Creek, Chicques Creek, Chikiswalunga Creek, Chikiswalungo Creek, Chiquasatunga Creek, Chiquesatonga Creek, and Chiquesatunga Creek.

== Course and watershed ==
Chiques Creek flows generally south for its entire course. The Chickies Creek watershed has a total area of 126 square miles (330 km^{2}) and is part of the larger Chesapeake Bay drainage basin. Chiques Creek's major tributary is Little Chiques Creek, entering roughly one mile upstream its mouth. (hence the variant names with Big in them for the main creek).

== Covered bridges ==
Five covered bridges cross the creek in Lancaster County:

- Shearer's Covered Bridge
- Kauffman's Distillery Covered Bridge
- Schenck's Mill Covered Bridge
- Siegrist's Mill Covered Bridge
- Forry's Mill Covered Bridge

== Tributaries ==
- Donegal Creek
- Little Chiques Creek
- Dellinger Run
- Hife Run
- Boyers Run
- Shearers Creek

== See also ==
- List of rivers of Pennsylvania
