= Donegal Mills Plantation =

Historic tavern in Pennsylvania, United States

- U.S. National Register of Historic Places
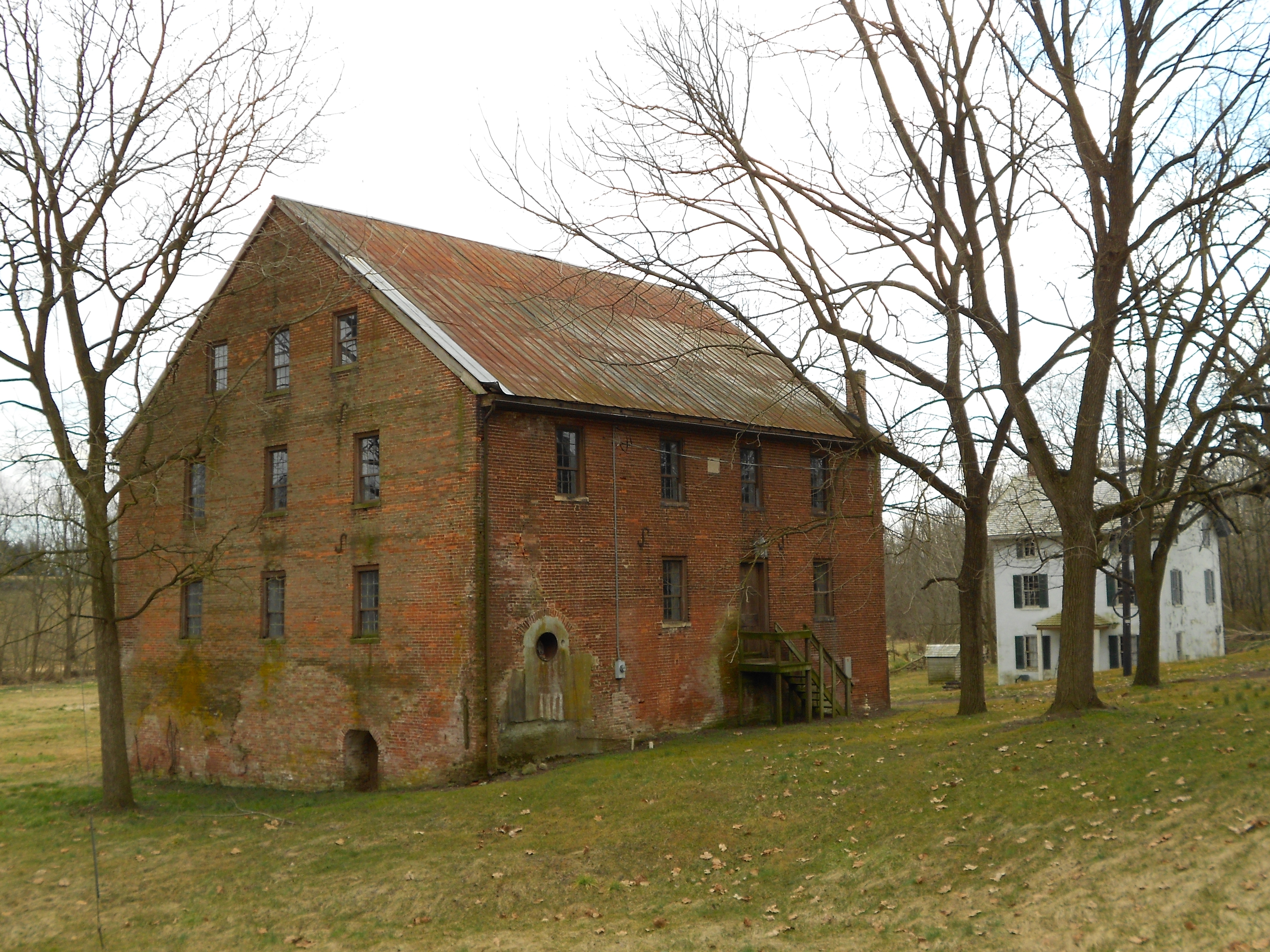
- The mill in February, 2012

- Location within Pennsylvania Location within the United States
- Location: Trout Run Rd., East Donegal Township, Pennsylvania
- Coordinates: 40°5′6″N 76°32′26″W
- Area: 3.5 acres (1.4 ha)
- Built: c. 1775, c. 1790, c. 1810, and 1830
- NRHP reference No.: 78002418
- Added to NRHP: January 20, 1978

Donegal Mills Plantation is a historic grist mill complex located at East Donegal Township, Lancaster County, Pennsylvania. The complex consists of the mill, mansion, miller's house, and bake house. The mill was built in 1775, and is a three-story building. The original section of mansion was built before 1790, and is a two-story, stuccoed stone building with a gable roof. The mansion was expanded about 1820, with a frame kitchen wing, and about 1830, with a stone two-story addition. It features a full-length, two-story, porch supported by five brick and stucco columns. The miller's house was originally built about, and is a 3 1/2-story, stuccoed stone building with a gable roof. It was expanded to its present size about 1830. The bake house is a two-story, gable roofed frame building. The property was auctioned in May 2010.

It was listed on the National Register of Historic Places in 1978.

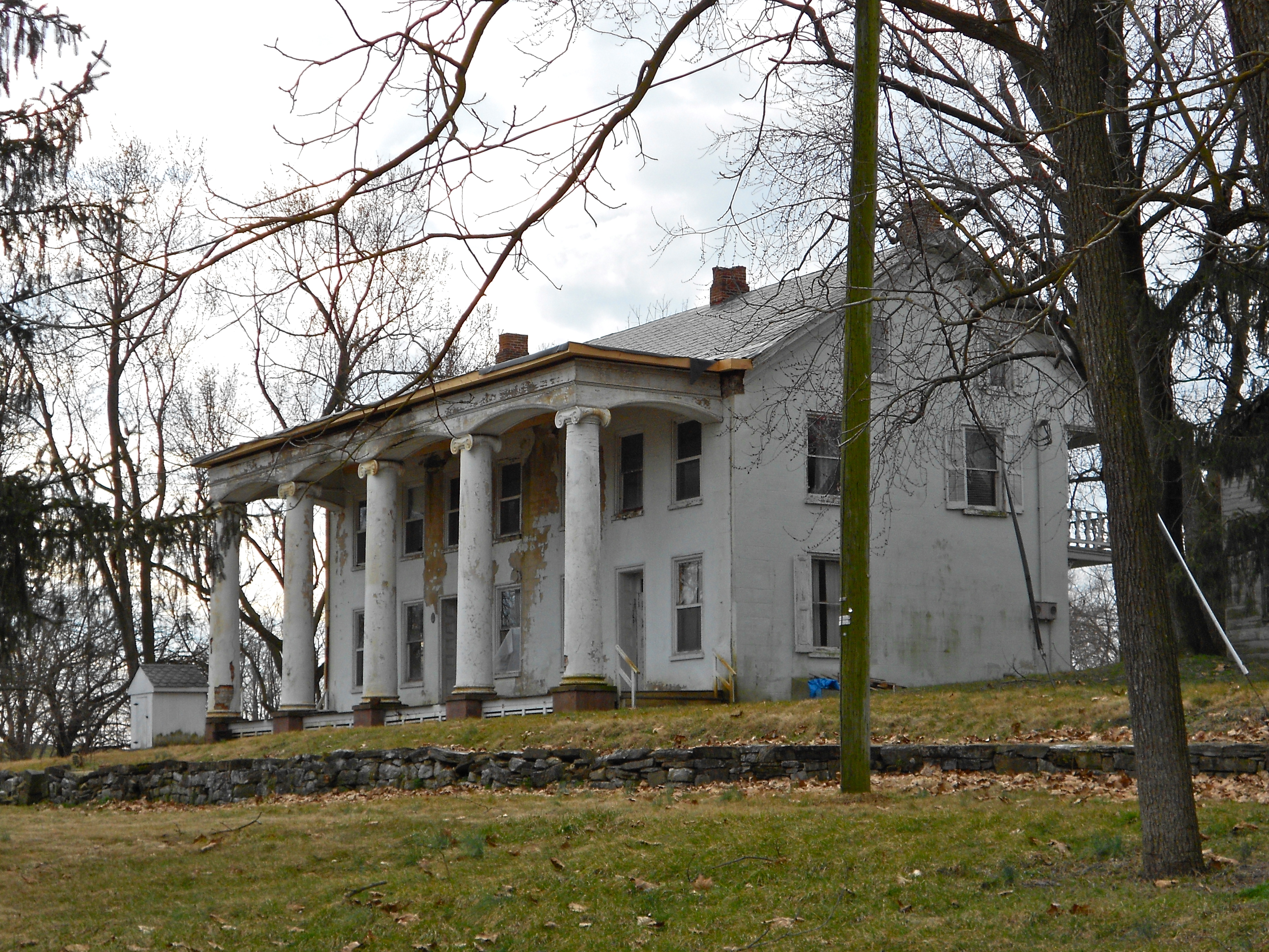
The Mansion house
