= Little Chiques Creek =

River in Pennsylvania, United States

Coordinates: 40.11746°N 76.50233°W

Little Chiques Creek (formerly known as Little Chickies Creek) is a 20.6-mile-long (33.2 km) tributary of Chiques Creek in Lancaster County, Pennsylvania in the United States.

Little Chiques Creek joins Chiques Creek 1.3 miles (2.1 km) upstream of the Susquehanna River.

== See also ==
- List of rivers of Pennsylvania
