= American colonial architecture =

Building design styles associated with the colonial period of the United States

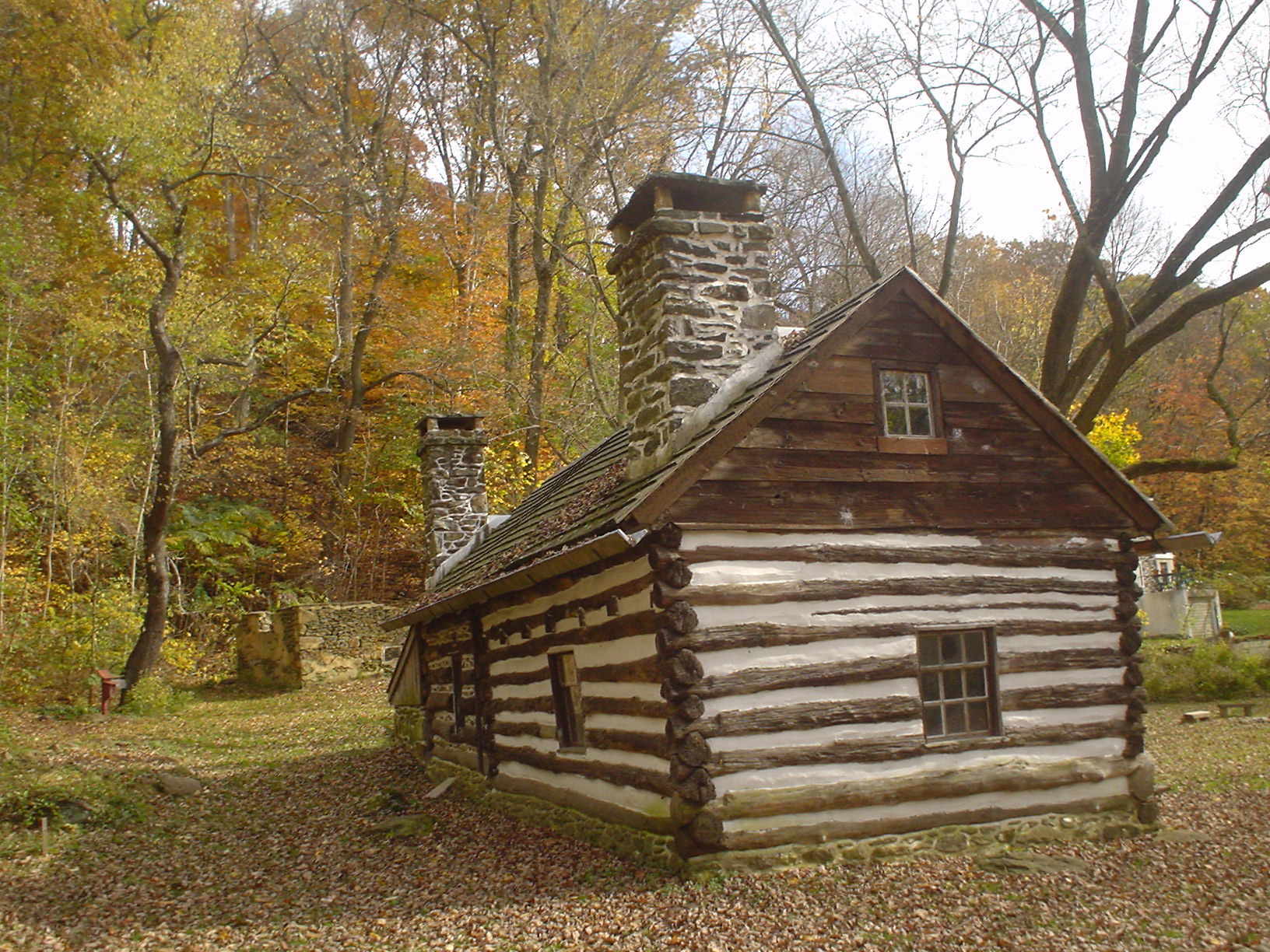
Lower Swedish Cabin, Drexel Hill, Upper Darby Township, Pennsylvania, built ca. 1640–1650, may be one of the oldest log cabins in the United States.

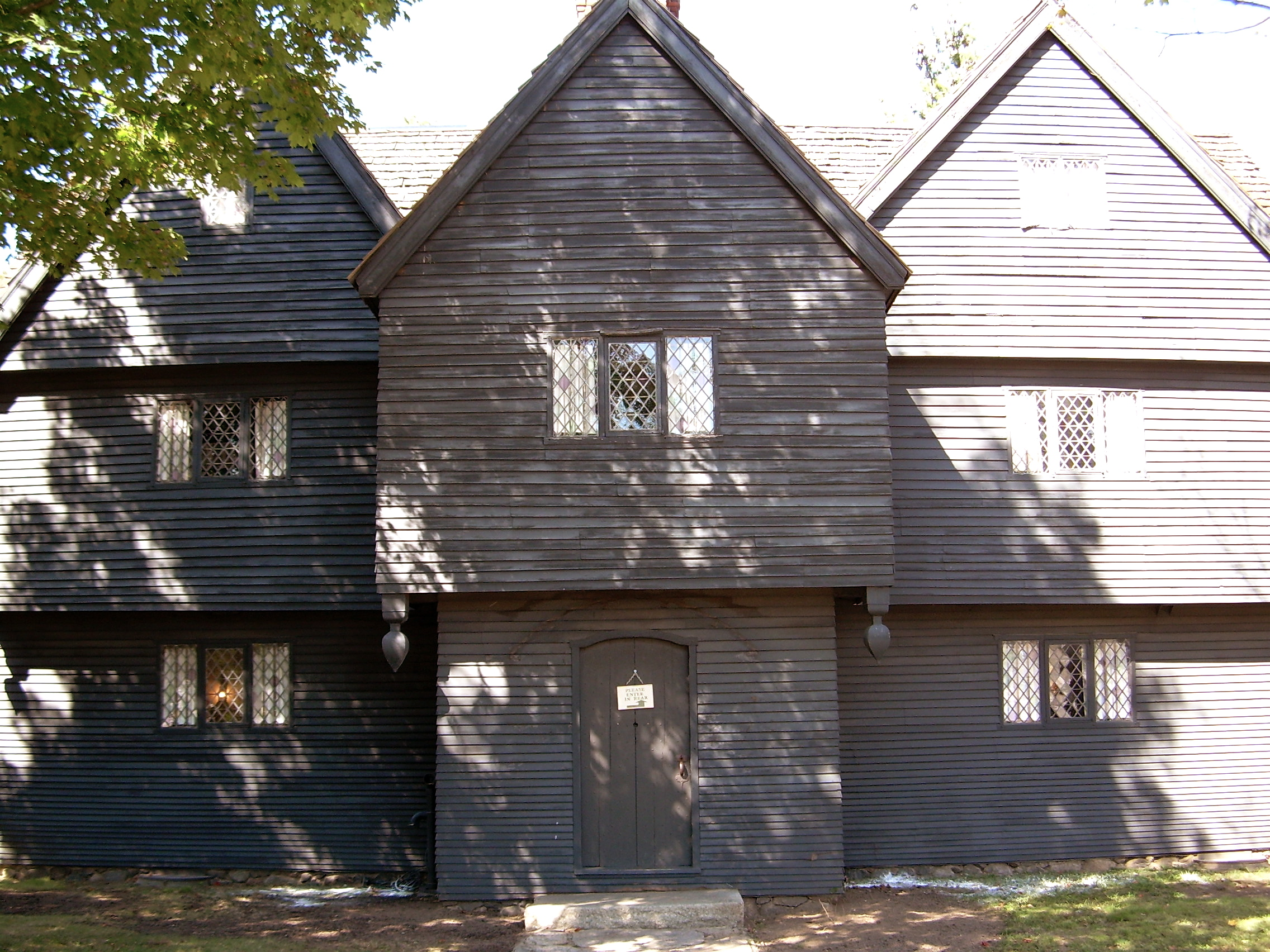
Corwin House, Salem, Massachusetts, built ca. 1670, First Period English

American colonial architecture includes several building design styles associated with the colonial period of the United States, including First Period English (late-medieval), Spanish Colonial, French Colonial, Dutch Colonial, and Georgian. These styles are associated with the houses, churches and government buildings of the period from about 1600 through the 19th century.

Several relatively distinct regional styles of colonial architecture are recognized in the United States. Building styles in the 13 colonies were influenced by techniques and styles from England, as well as traditions brought by settlers from other parts of Europe. In New England, 17th-century colonial houses were built primarily from wood, following styles found in the southeastern counties of England. Saltbox style homes and Cape Cod style homes were some of the simplest of homes constructed in the New England colonies. The Saltbox homes known for their steep roof among the back the house made for easy construction among colonists. The Cape Cod style homes were a common home in the early 17th of New England colonists, these homes featured a simple, rectangular shape commonly used by colonists. Dutch Colonial structures, built primarily in the Hudson River Valley, Long Island, and northern New Jersey, reflected construction styles from Holland and Flanders and used stone and brick more extensively than buildings in New England. In Maryland, Virginia, and the Carolinas, a style called "Southern Colonial" is recognized, characterized by the hall and parlor and central-passage house types, which often had large chimneys projecting from the gable-ends of the house. In the Delaware Valley, Swedish colonial settlers introduced the log cabin to America. A style sometimes called Pennsylvania colonial appeared later (after 1681) and incorporates Georgian architectural influences. A Pennsylvania Dutch style is recognized in parts of southeastern Pennsylvania that were settled by German immigrants in the 18th century.

Early buildings in some other areas of the United States reflect the architectural traditions of the colonial powers that controlled these regions. The architectural style of Louisiana is identified as French colonial, while the Spanish colonial style evokes Renaissance and Baroque styles of Spain and Mexico; in the United States it is found in Florida, Louisiana, New Mexico, Texas, Arizona, and California.

== Subtypes ==
First Period is a designation given to building styles used in the earliest English settlements at Jamestown, Virginia (1607), and Plymouth, Massachusetts (1620), and later in the other British colonies along the Eastern seaboard.

These buildings typically included as steep roofs, small casement leaded glass windows (usually due to a scarcity of glass in the colonies), rich ornamentation (in the more expensive house only) and a massive central chimney.

=== French Colonial ===
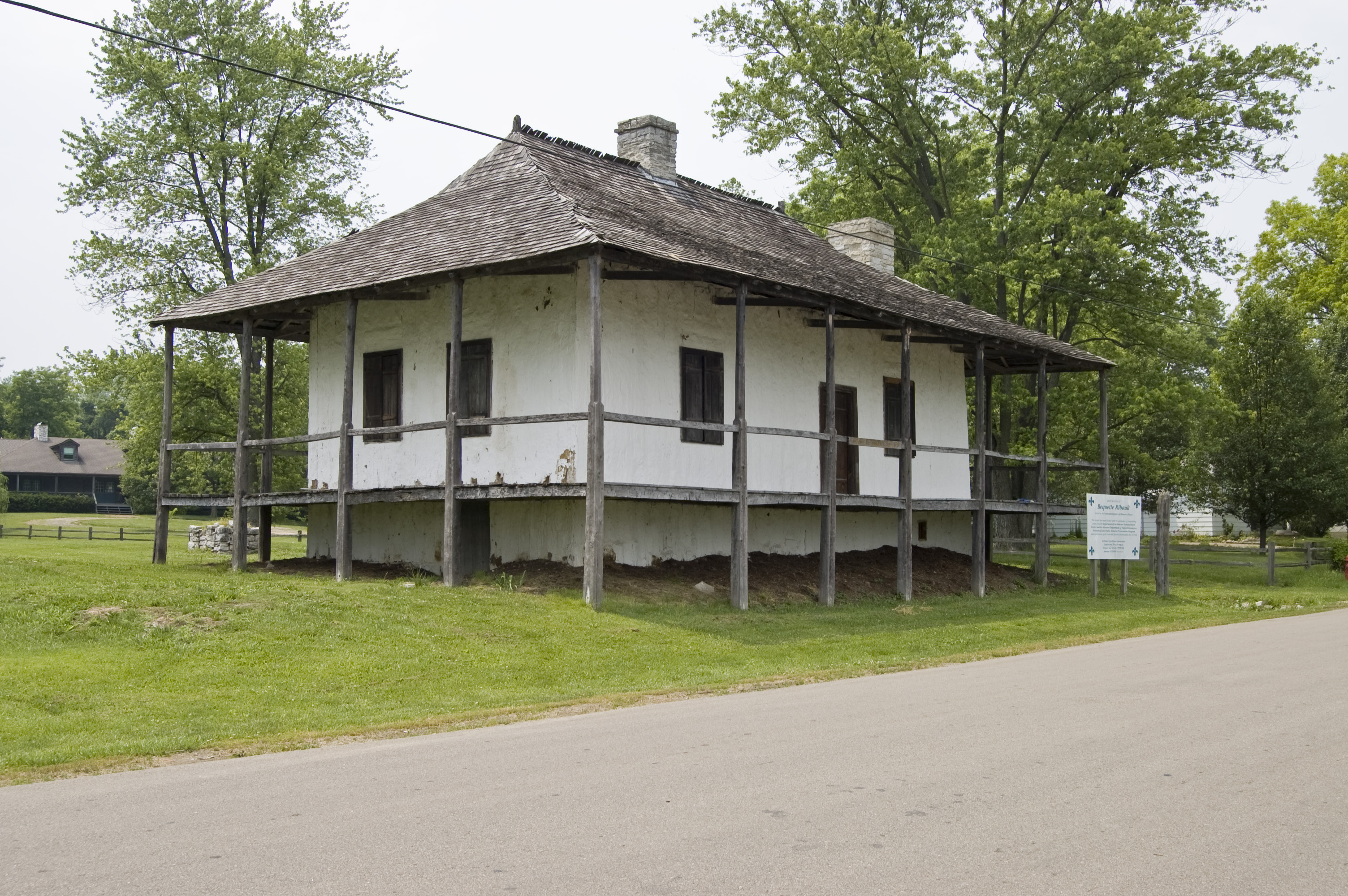
Bequette–Ribault House in Ste. Geneviève, Missouri, built 1778, French colonial

Developed in French-settled areas of North America beginning with the founding of Quebec in 1608, Mobile, Alabama in 1702, and New Orleans, Louisiana, in 1718, as well as along the Mississippi River valley to Missouri.

The early French Colonial house type of the Mississippi River Valley region was the poteaux-en-terre, constructed of heavy upright cedar logs set vertically into the ground. These basic houses featured double-pitched hipped roofs and were surrounded by porches (galleries) to handle the hot summer climate.

By 1770, the basic French Colonial house form evolved into the briquette-entre-poteaux (small bricks between posts) style familiar in the historic areas of New Orleans and other areas. These homes featured double-louvred doors, flared hip roofs, dormers, and shutters.

=== Spanish Colonial ===
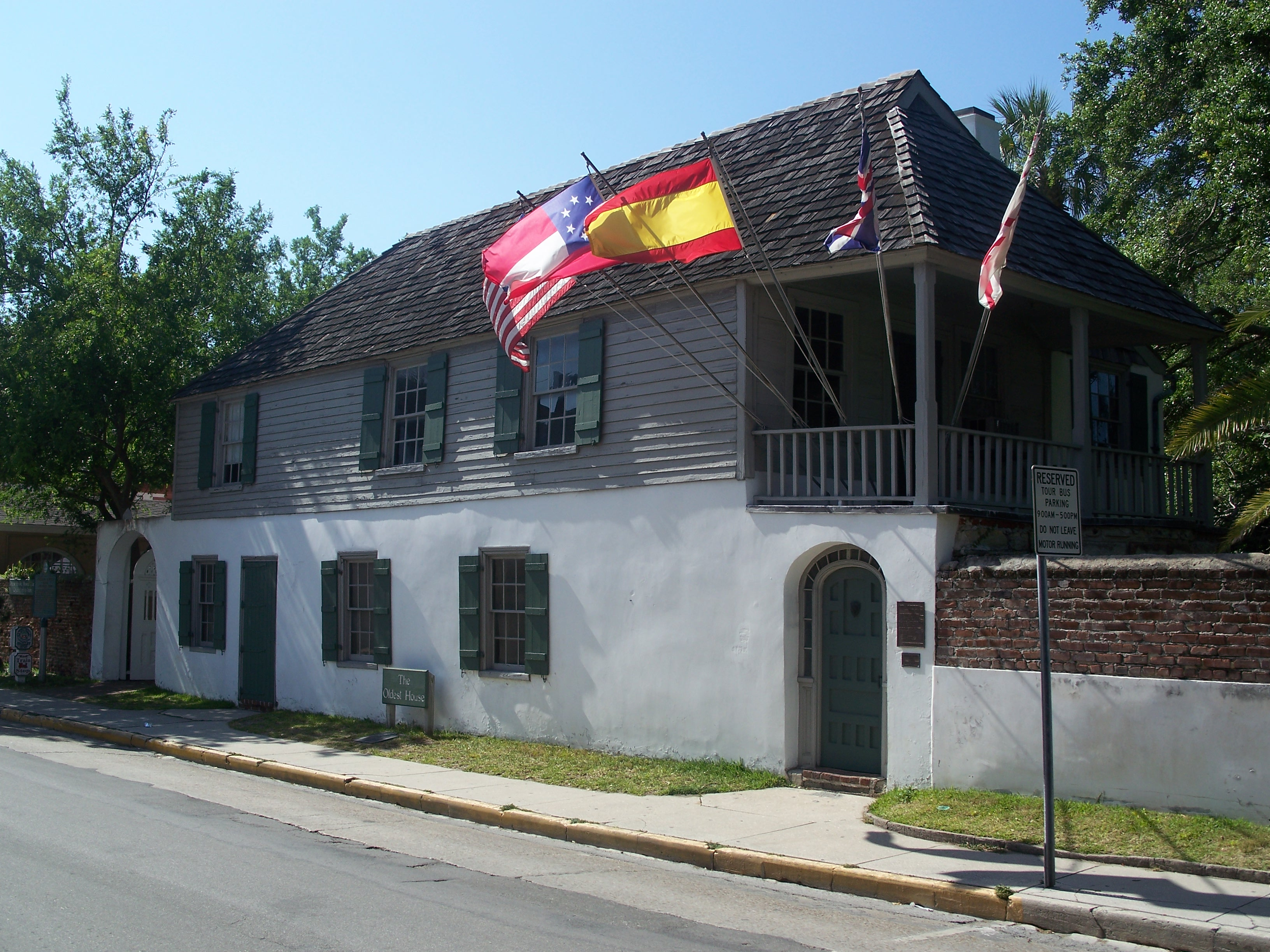
Gonzalez–Alvarez House, St. Augustine, Florida, built 1723, Spanish colonial

Developed with the earlier Spanish settlements in the Caribbean and Mexico, the Spanish Colonial style in the United States can be traced back to St. Augustine, Florida, the oldest established city in the country, founded in 1565. The early type of dwelling in Spanish Florida was the "board house", a small one-room cottage constructed of pit-sawn softwood boards, typically with a thatched roof. Coquina, a limestone conglomerate containing shells of small mollusks, was used as a building stone in St. Augustine as early as 1598 and has been used as recently as the 1930s in construction. There were coquina quarries on Anastasia Island. From these quarries, coquina was brought to build the Castillo de San Marcos, Fort Matanzas, the Cathedral Basilica, and homes throughout Florida's colonial period. Tabby, made of lime, oyster shells, water, ash, and sand, was often poured out to make a hard flooring in these structures. During the 18th century, the "common houses" were whitewashed in lime mortar with an oyster shell aggregate. Typically two-story, the houses included cooling porches to accommodate the Florida climate.

The style developed in the Southwest with Pueblo design influences from the indigenous Puebloan peoples architecture.

In Alta California, present-day California, the style developed differently, being too far for imported building materials and without skilled builders, into a strong simple version for building the missions between 1769 and 1823. Ranchos were typically built of adobe.

=== Dutch Colonial ===
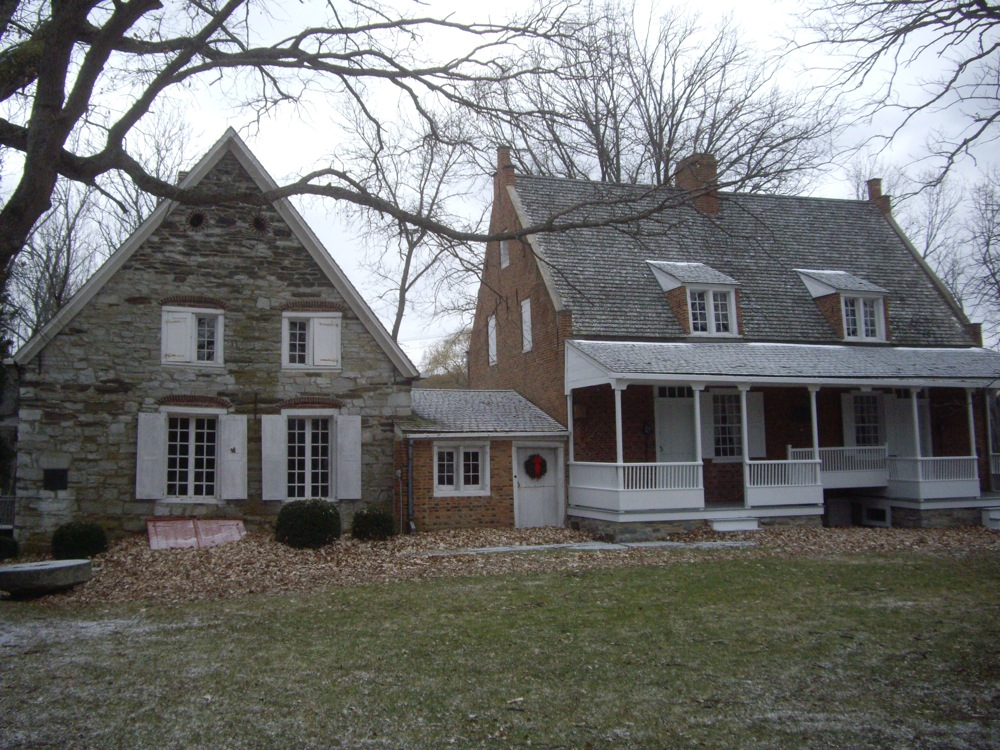
Bronck House, Coxsackie, NY, built 1663; Dutch Colonial

Developed from around 1630 with the arrival of Dutch colonists to New Amsterdam and the Hudson River Valley in what is now New York and in Bergen in what is now New Jersey. Initially the settlers built small, one room cottages with stone walls and steep roofs to allow a second floor loft. By 1670 or so, two-story gable-end homes were common in New Amsterdam.

In the countryside of the Hudson Valley, the Dutch farmhouse evolved into a linear-plan home with straight-edged gables moved to the end walls. Around 1720, the distinctive gambrel roof was adopted from the English styles, with the addition of overhangs on the front and rear to protect the mud mortar used in the typically stone walls and foundations.

Monmouth County in central New Jersey has many surviving examples of a hybrid of the Dutch style termed Anglo-Dutch colonial architecture. Usually the earliest portions of the houses are one room and built in Dutch style with later additions built in the Georgian architecture style. Examples being the Hankinson–Moreau–Covenhoven House, the Holmes-Hendrickson House, and many houses at Monmouth Battlefield State Park.

=== German Colonial ===
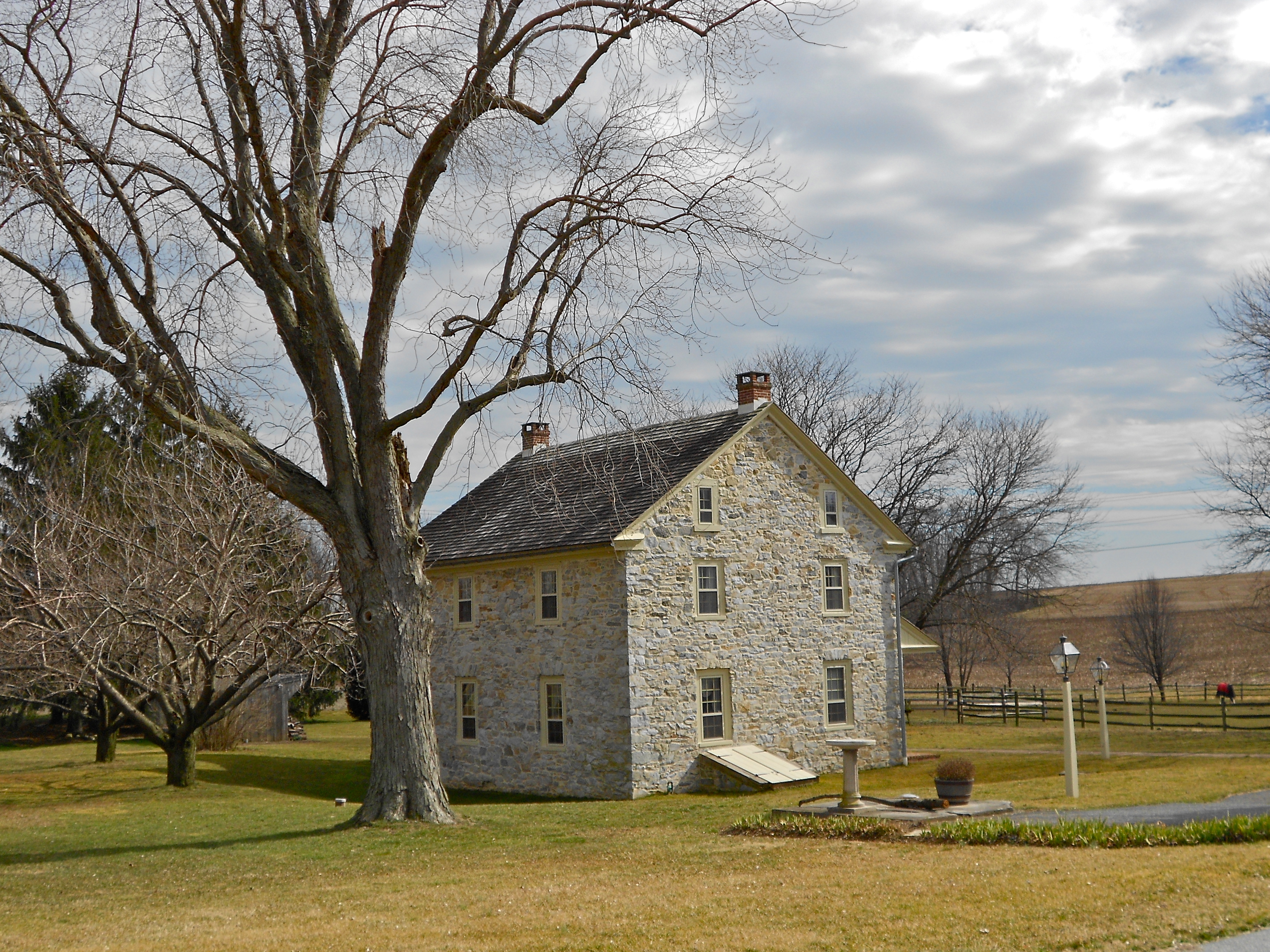
Byers-Muma House, East Donegal Township, Lancaster County, Pennsylvania, built c. 1740; German Colonial

Developed after about 1675, when the Delaware River Valley area (Pennsylvania, New Jersey and Delaware) was settled by immigrants from Sweden, Finland, Scotland, Ireland, Germany and several other northern European nations. The early colonists to this region adapted the "half-timber" style of construction then popular in Europe, which used a frame of braced timbers filled-in with masonry. The "bank house" was a popular form of home during this period, typically constructed into a hillside for protection during the cold winters and hot summers of the region.

The two-story "country townhouse" was also common around Pennsylvania during this time.

=== Mid-Atlantic Colonial ===
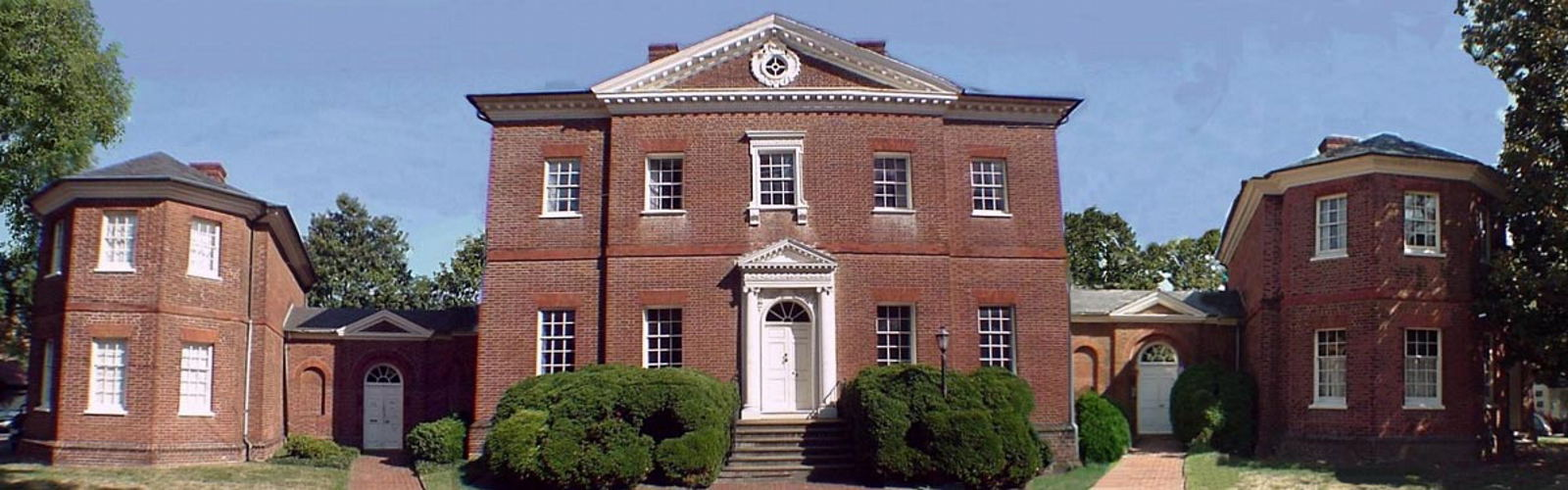
The main facade of Hammond–Harwood House

The region surrounding the Chesapeake Bay on America's east coast was settled primarily by British settlers. The standard vernacular house built by the colonists in this region between the first settlement in 1607 and the end of British rule in 1776 followed the I-plan format, had either interior or exterior gable chimneys, and was either wooden or brick. Most were only one room deep.

Academic architecture was evident, but it was relatively scarce. The best example of Mid-Atlantic Colonial academic architecture is the 1774 Hammond–Harwood House in Annapolis, Maryland. This house was modeled on the Villa Pisani in Montagnana, Italy, as exhibited in the Renaissance architect Andrea Palladio's Four Books of Architecture (1570). Colonial architect William Buckland designed this house in 1774 and the resulting house is a very skillful adaptation of the Villa Pisani for the warmer climate of the Chesapeake Bay region.

=== Colonial Georgian ===
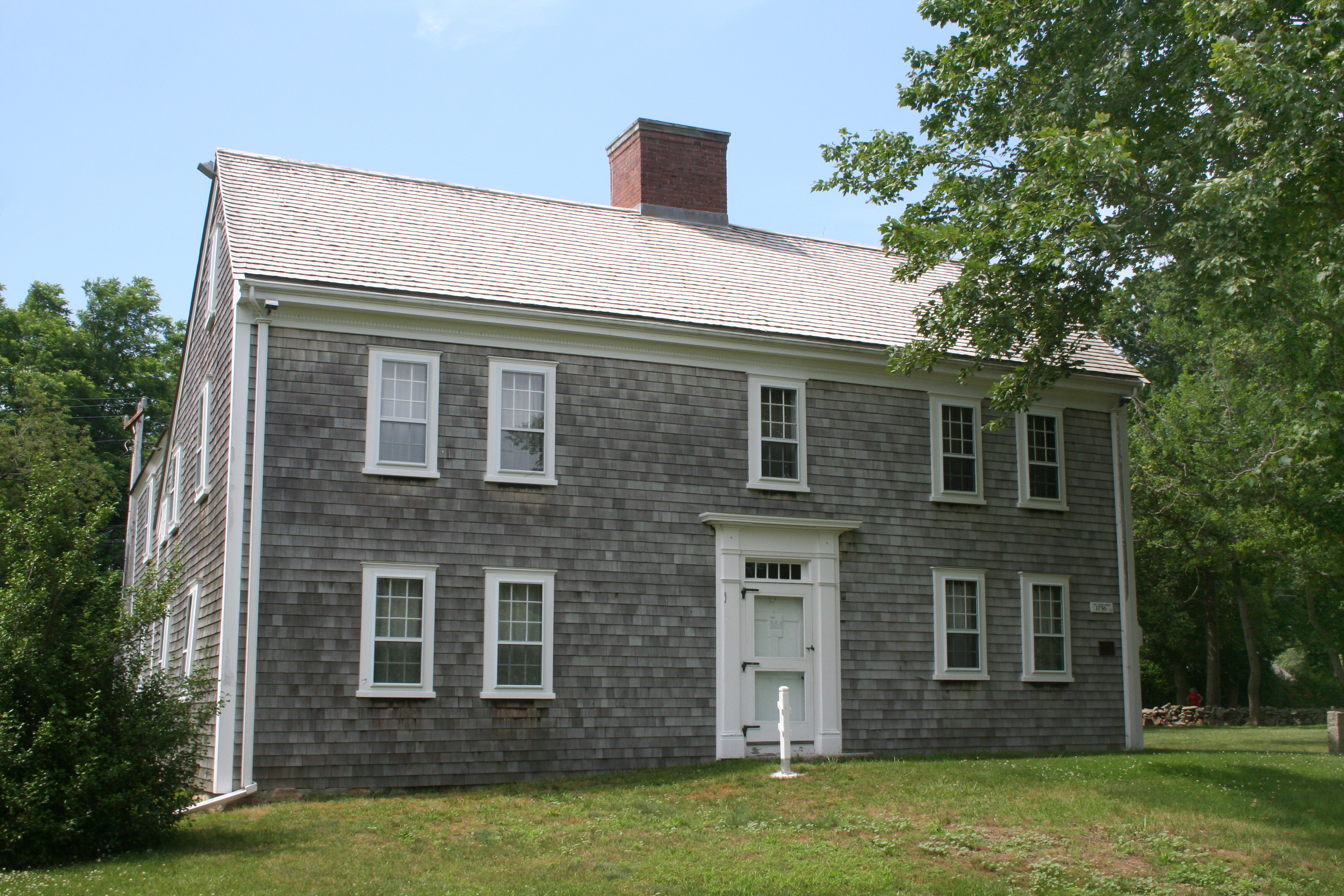
Josiah Dennis House, Dennis, Massachusetts, built 1735, Georgian colonial

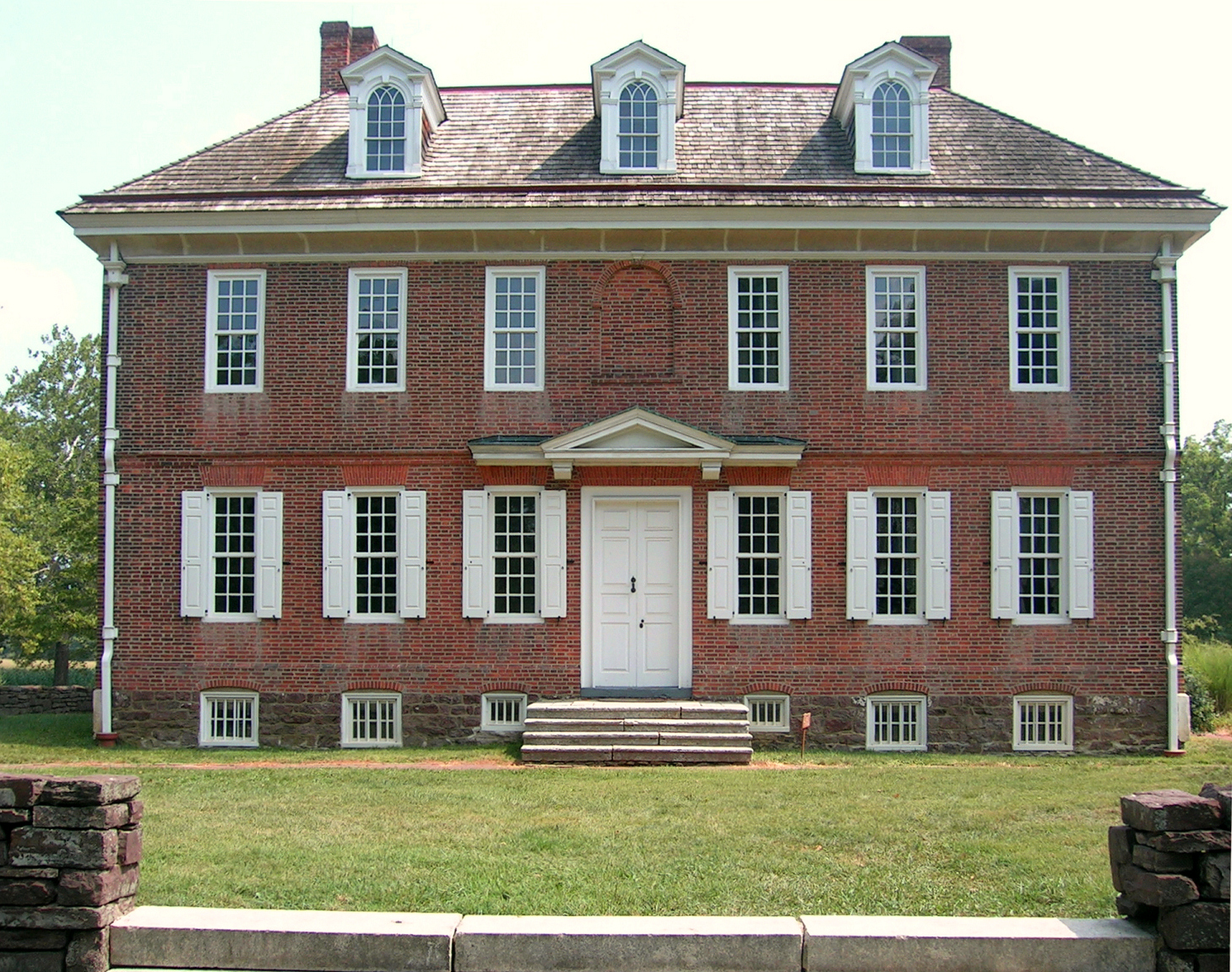
Hope Lodge, Whitemarsh Township, Pennsylvania, built 1750, Georgian colonial

Georgian buildings, popular during the reigns of King George II and King George III were ideally built in brick, with wood trim, wooden columns and painted white. In what would become the United States, however, one found both brick buildings as well as those in wood with clapboards. They were sometimes painted a pale yellow. This differentiated them from most other structures that were usually not painted. Mostly box shaped with multiple chimneys. Georgian architecture was based on classical architecture dating to an Italian Renaissance period. Architect Christopher Wren, who designed the Wren Building at the College of William & Mary, was a renowned Georgian architect in the colonies.

A Georgian colonial house usually has a formally defined living room, dining room and sometimes a family room. The bedrooms are typically on the second floor. They also have one or two chimneys that can be very large. The Georgian architectural style was most common from the early eighteenth century until the Revolutionary War, after which the American Federal style of architecture emerged. Examples of remaining Georgian buildings include Gunston Hall and Hope Lodge.

Identifying features (1700 – c. 1780):

- Panel front door centered, topped with rectangular windows (in door or as a transom) and capped with an elaborate crown/entablature supported by decorative pilasters
- Cornice embellished with decorative moldings, usually dentilwork
- Multi-pane windows and fenestrations arranged symmetrically (whether vertical or horizontal)

Other features of Georgian style houses can include – roof to ground-level:

- Roofs are side-gabled, gambrel, or hipped
- Chimneys on both sides of the home
- A portico.
- Small six-paned sash windows or dormer windows in the upper floors, primarily used for servant's quarters.
- Larger windows with nine or twelve panes on the main floors

== See also ==
- American historic carpentry
- List of house types
- List of house styles
- Colonial Revival architecture
- Spanish Colonial Revival architecture
- Federal architecture
- Saltbox
- Cape Cod (house)
- Southern Colonial style in California
- County courthouse architecture in colonial America
