= Southern Colonial style in California =

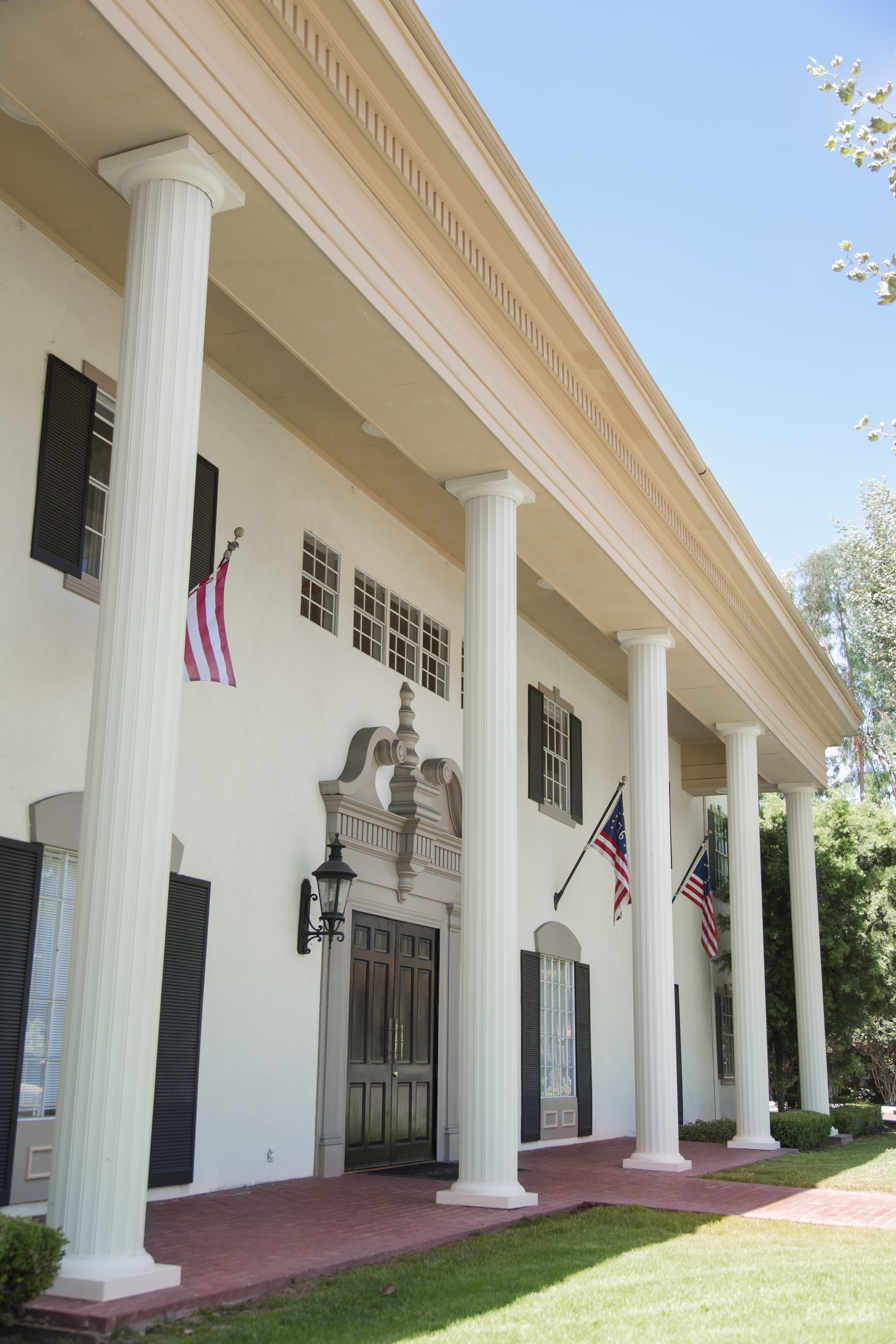
The facade of a southern colonial building, including symmetrical sets of columns, moldings, and brick walkway.

Southern Colonial is an American architectural style which evolved in the Southern Colonies during the Colonial period. As a result of the growing wealth in the South during that time, the architecture aspired to the ideals of Greek Revival. It is defined by the Barron's Real Estate Dictionary as " a large, Early American style, 2- or 3-story frame house with a characteristic colonnade extending across the front. The roof extends over the colonnade."

== Features of the Southern Colonial ==
=== Setback from the road ===
The Southern Colonial is typically set back a wider distance from the road to create a feeling of stately elegance.

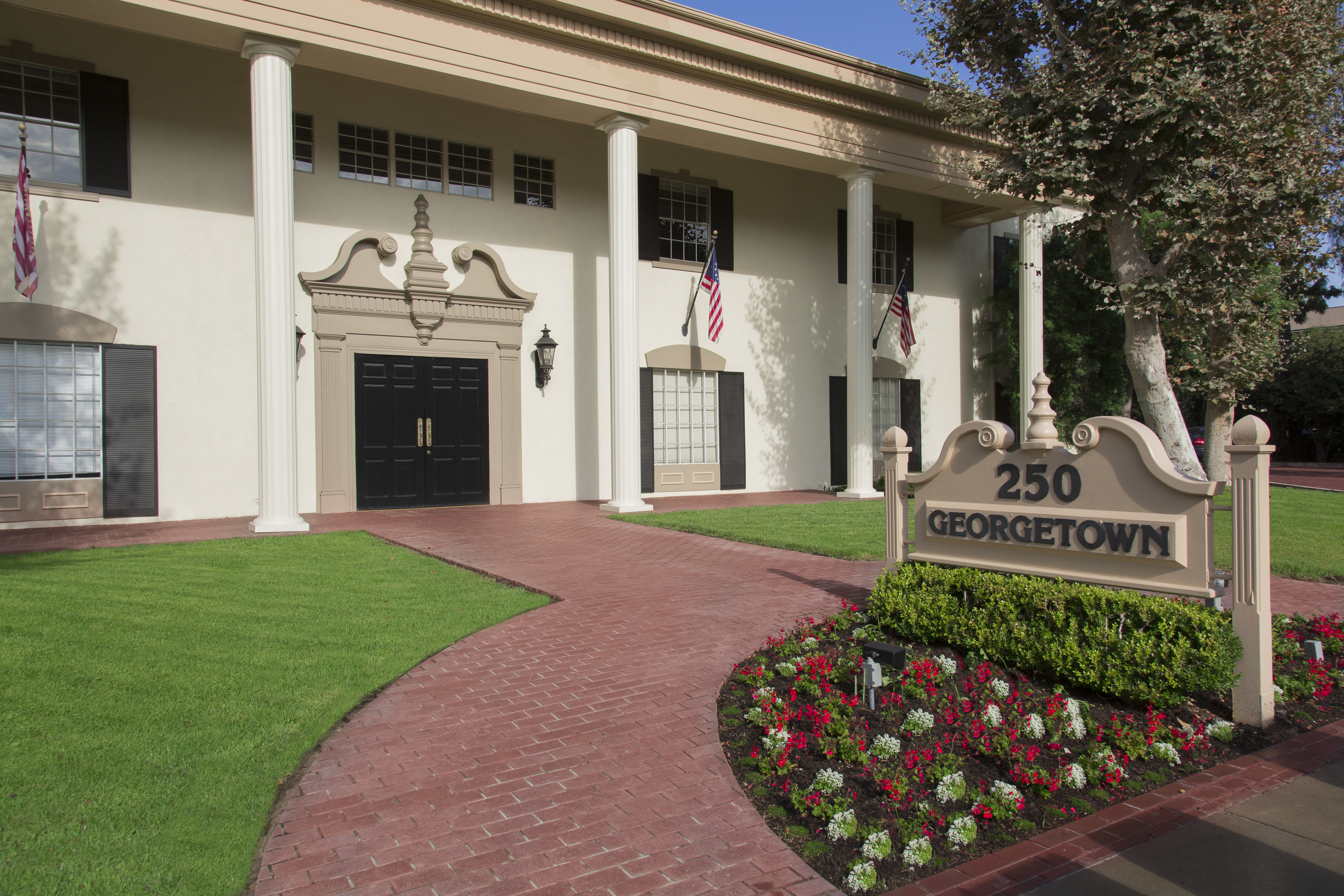
The Georgetown building offers a great example of the Southern Colonial style of architecture in southern California, with a wide setback covered with grass, cut by a running brick walkway leading to wide, crown-molded double doors.

=== The Characteristic Colonnade ===
A main feature of the Southern Colonial is the placement of a long sequence of columns, numbering typically 4 to 6 columns, comprising a colonnade, borrowed from classical Greek design.

=== The Portico ===
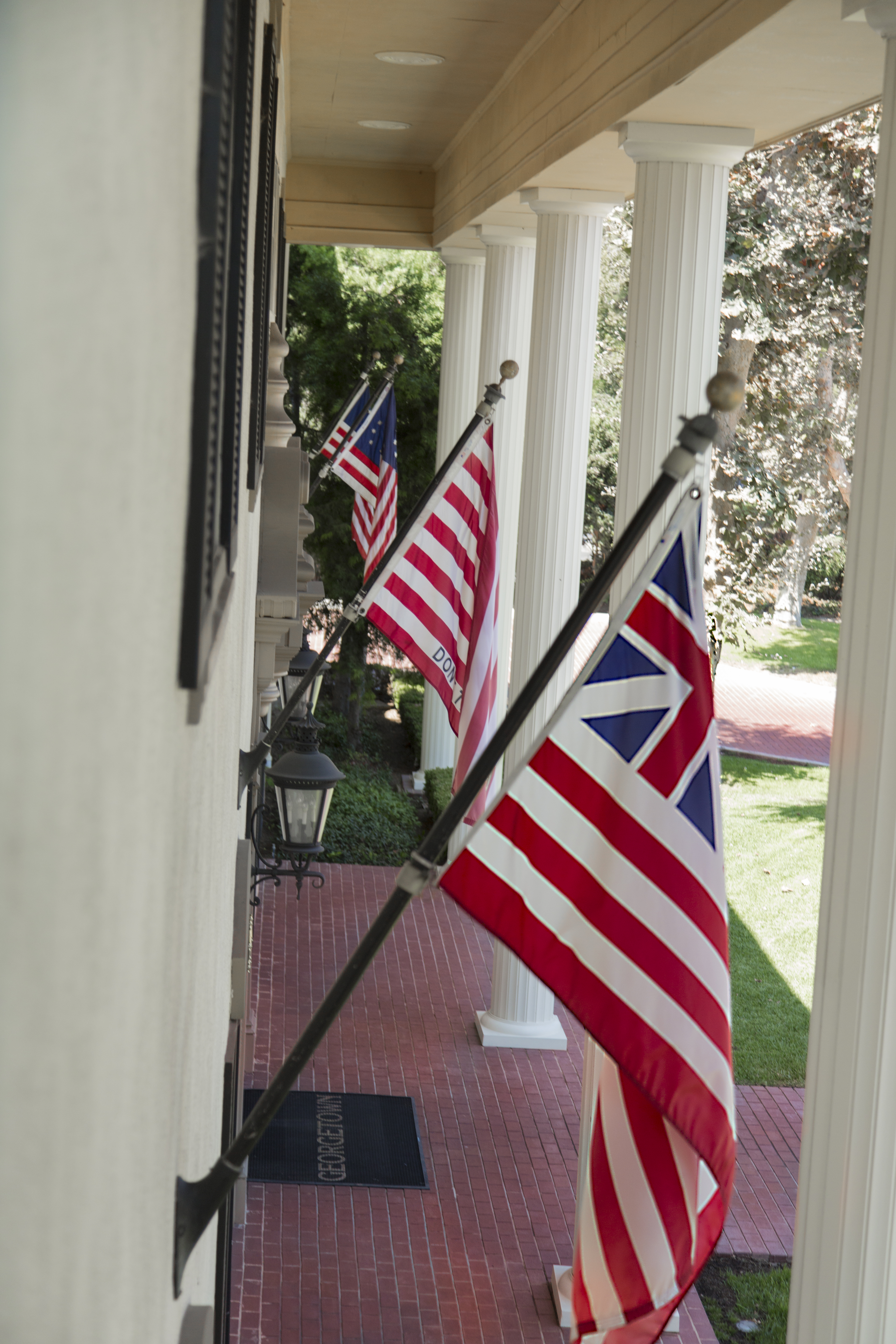
Numerous flags, especially historical American flags, hang elegantly from this colonial building.

The portico is another characteristic of the Southern Colonial. It is the front patio just behind the colonnade. The roof extends to cover the portico and connects the colonnade. In Mount Vernon, George Washington's home, the portico contains a row of wooden lounge chairs looking out towards the front lawn and beyond. In other examples, the portico can be used to house a series of flags hung from flagpoles diagonally projecting out from the front of the building.

=== Symmetry ===
Symmetry of all the elements is an important feature of the Southern Colonial. The main door is always in the center just behind the colonnade, and windows to the left and right of the main door, usually surrounded by black shutters. A center hallway is typical in the interior, along with a grand staircase and use of chandeliers. If a brick exterior walkway is employed, it is also usually symmetrical.

=== Extensive Use of Molding ===
A feature of the Southern Colonial is the extensive use of molding inside and out. Dentil molding is commonly used to delineate the end of a rafter. In classical architecture, a dentil is a repeating ornament typically used where the cornice projects. In Roman architecture, the dentil delineates the end of a rafter. The main door in the front center of the southern colonial is typically adorned overhead with symmetrical pediments placed above the header, which rests on capital-crowned pilasters, with a frieze situated in between, just below the header. Crown molding is extensively used in the interior. French windows are usually used.

=== Use of Colors ===
As with its Western counterparts, white and off-white are predominantly used on the outside, with some buildings using tricolors of cream and tan. In the interior, the same colors are occasionally used as in the outside, but the use of colonial blue and yellow on the trim and walls, contrasted with red carpeting, are also employed to give a rich regal feeling.

== Migration of Architectural Styles to California ==
=== Nineteenth Century ===
Architectural styles migrated to the West along with the pioneers. Of the myriad of architectural styles represented in the migration to California, the Southern Colonial style was not frequently seen.

=== Turn of the Century ===
The Los Angeles Building Department records show that the Southern Colonial style was very rare, although some Early Colonial and Neoclassical Revival styles appeared at this time. The Early Colonial style can be recognized by its saltbox design. It is a simple but timeless design which imparts a New England feel. Neoclassical is a style which is derived from the architecture of ancient Greece. An example of the neoclassical is the California State Capitol.

The Southern Colonial style, however, which embodies a fusion of NeoClassical or Greek Revival with Early Colonial, did not appear often in the migration of architectural styles to California. Therefore, authentic examples of the elegance that is usually associated with the film "Gone with the Wind" and with Governor's mansions in the South continue to be very rare in California today.

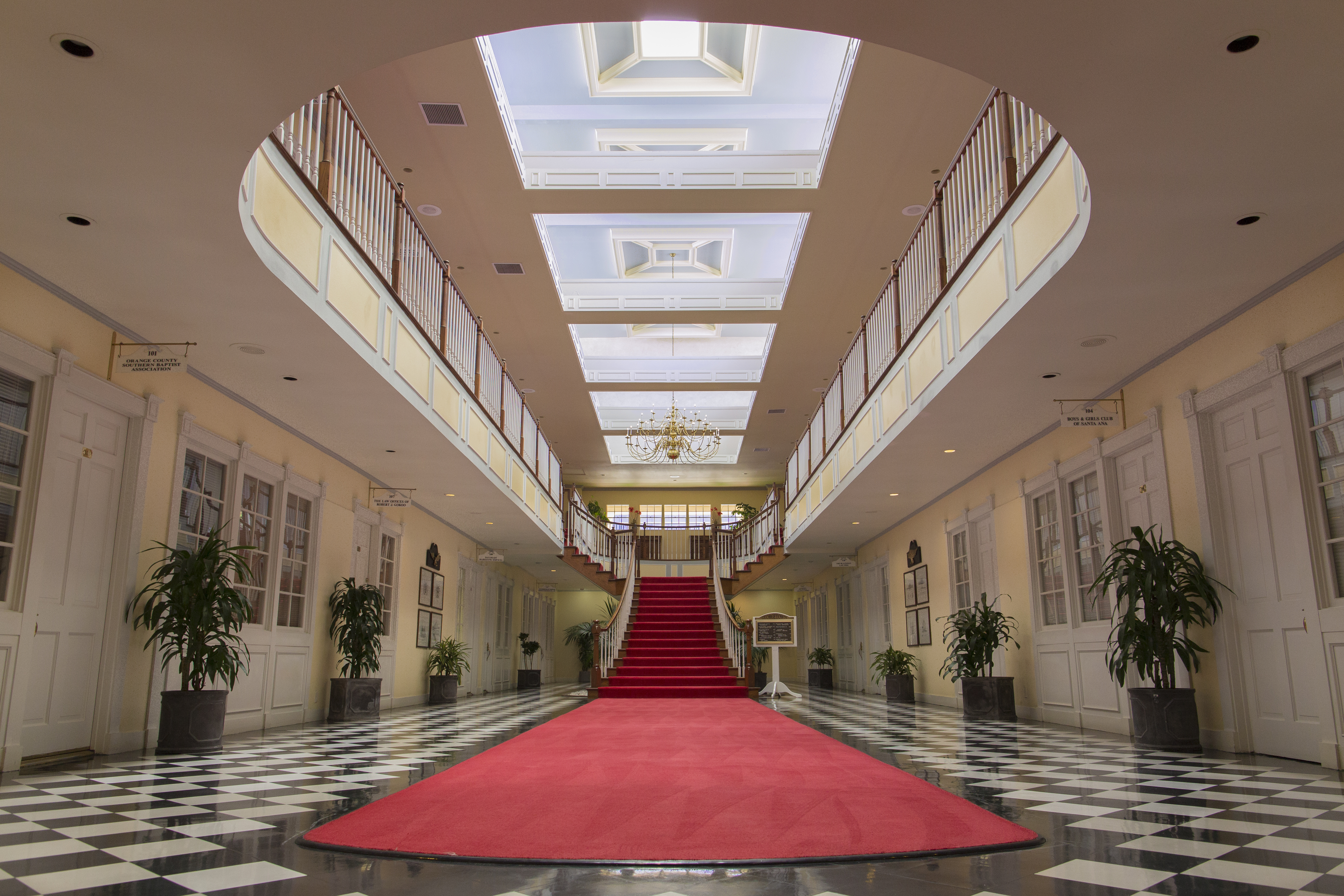
Elegant red carpeting leading to a wide staircase, gracefully joining first and second floors. The red carpeting and sky blue ceiling are hallmarks of interior colonial style.

== Examples of Southern Colonial Architecture in California ==
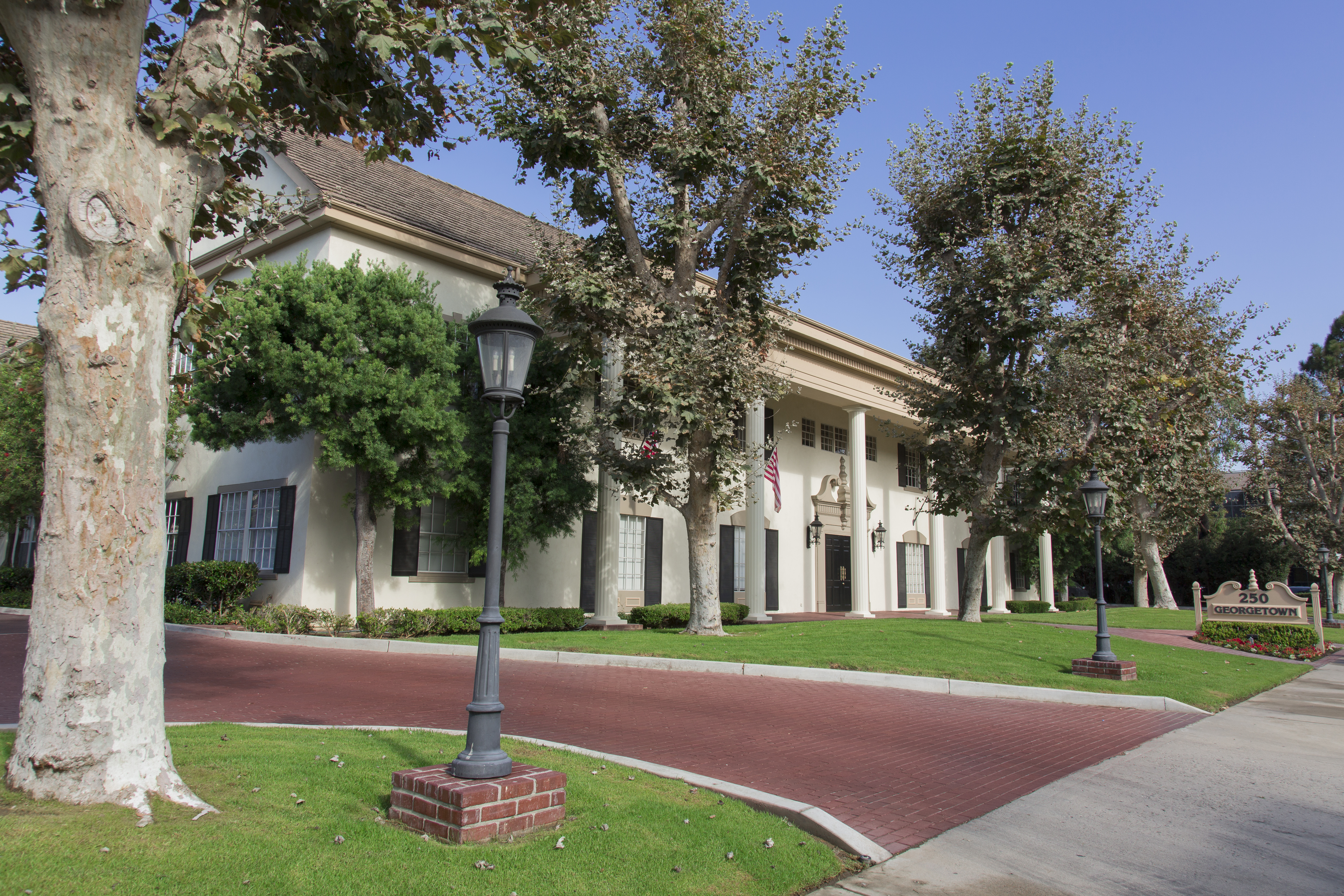
A wide setback from the street, liberally decorated with foliage and brick as seen here, is typical of the southern colonial style.

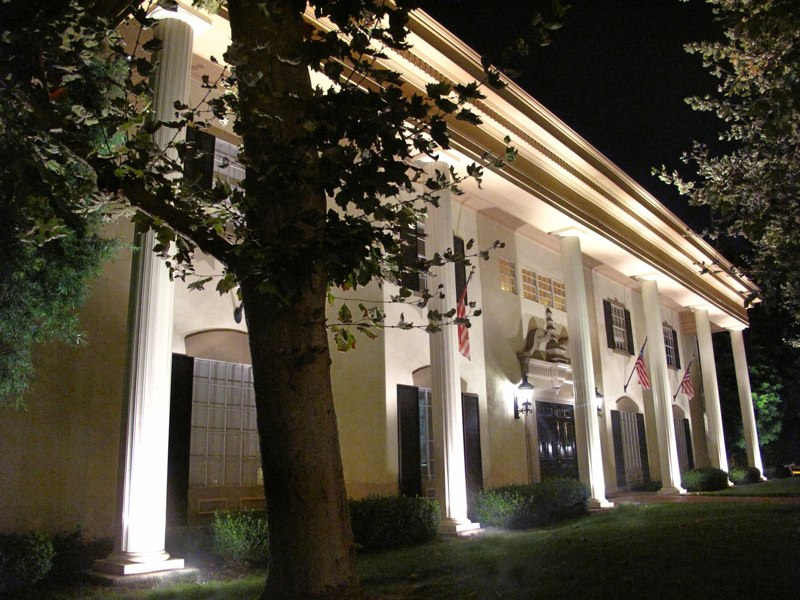
Flattering nighttime lights are a modern touch frequently added to Southern Colonial buildings to accent their beautiful architecture after sundown.

=== The Georgetown Building ===
An example of Southern Colonial architectural style in California is the Georgetown Building, a Southern Colonial statehouse in Santa Ana, California. This is a striking example of Southern Colonial style, with an elegant colonnade.

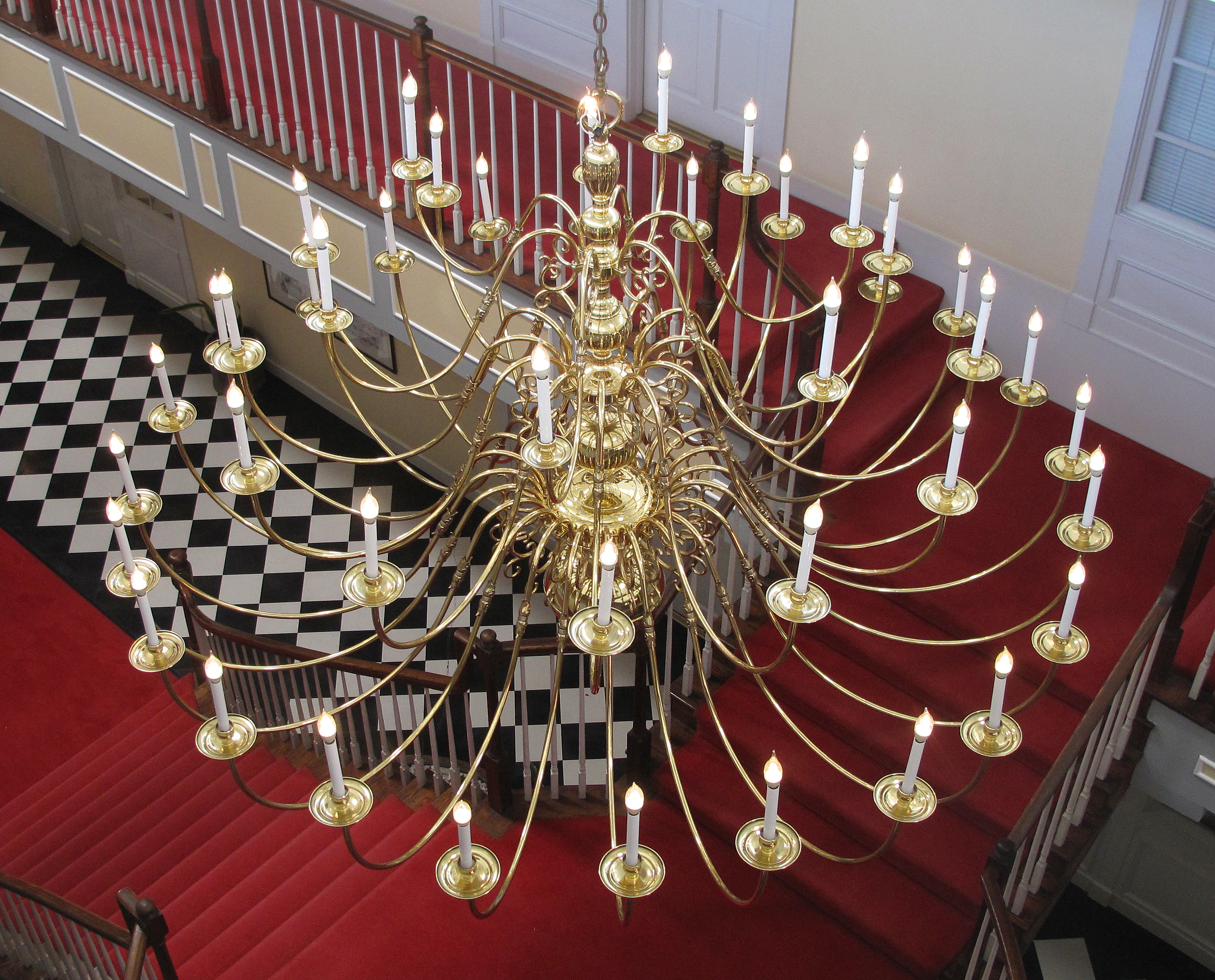
Use of brass hardware and chandeliers are common elements of Southern Colonial style as shown in the Georgetown Building.

Set back from the street a wider distance than usual, the green front lawn contains colonial lampposts which stand guard by the street. Extensive use of colonial red brick is common for walkways and patio areas. A main door, intricately adorned with crown moldings, stands in the center between shuttered colonial windows. Within the portico, short flagpoles with American and colonial flags project diagonally outward from the front of the building.

Characteristic of the Southern Colonial style, the interior of the building has features that are just as distinctive as the exterior. In the Georgetown Building, the main door opens into a central hallway with a roll of royal red carpeting which leads to a grand staircase. A large chandelier hangs above the staircase's middle landing. This building contains all the elements of true Southern Colonial architecture.

While the Georgetown Building is a commercial example, a few residential examples can also be found. There are some examples in Hancock Park, as well as Bing Crosby's house in Toluca Lake and a mansion in Glendale built by one of the partners of J.C. Penney's Corporation.

=== Hancock Park Southern Colonial Homes ===
The Hancock Park neighborhood in Los Angeles contains numerous historical homes of various periods and styles, and the Southern Colonial is also represented in this neighborhood. Hancock Park was developed by the La Brea Tar Pits oil tycoon G. Allan Hancock in the 1920s. It has remained one of the most affluent and fashionable residential districts in the city.

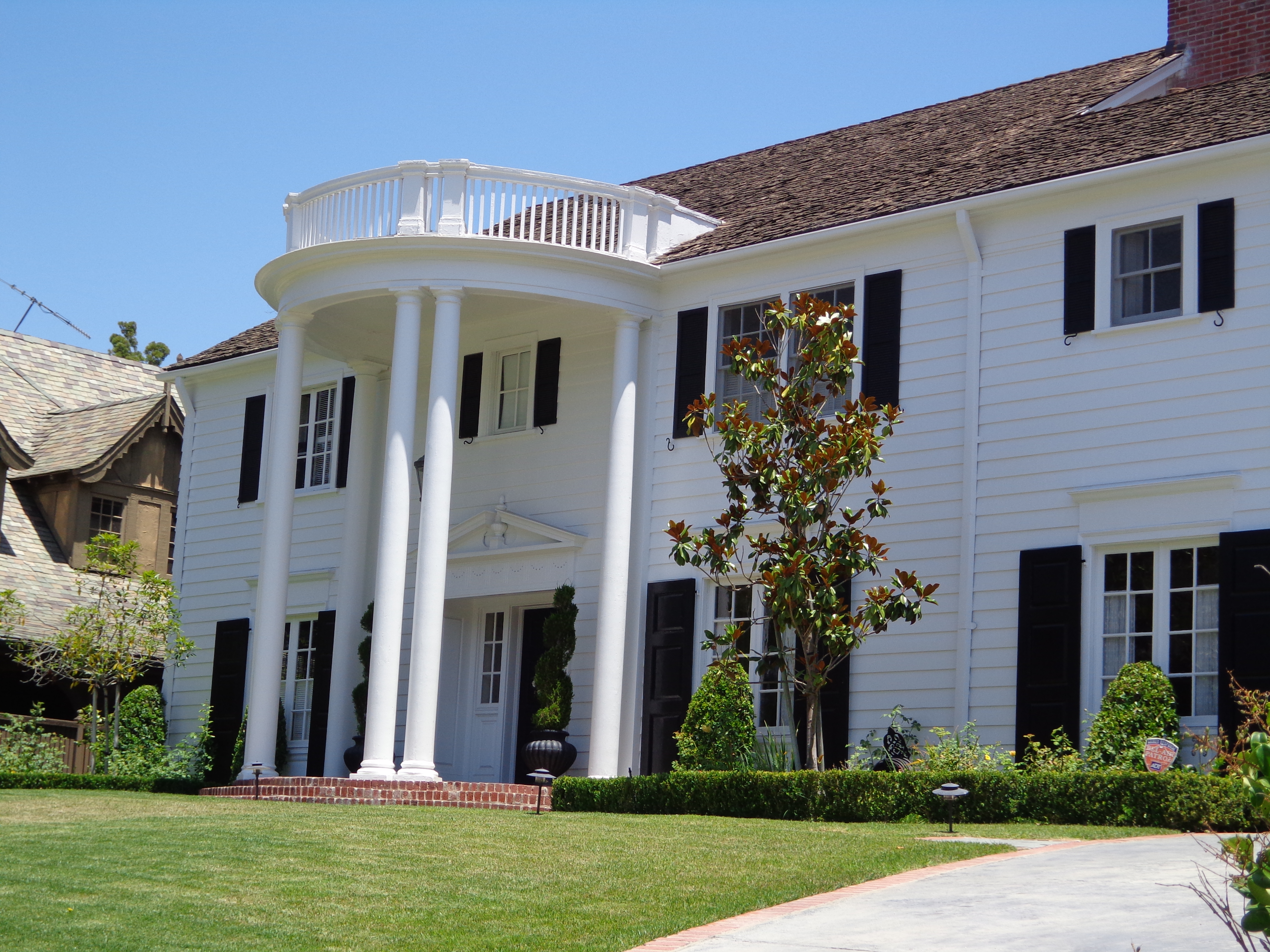
A Hancock Park Southern Colonial.

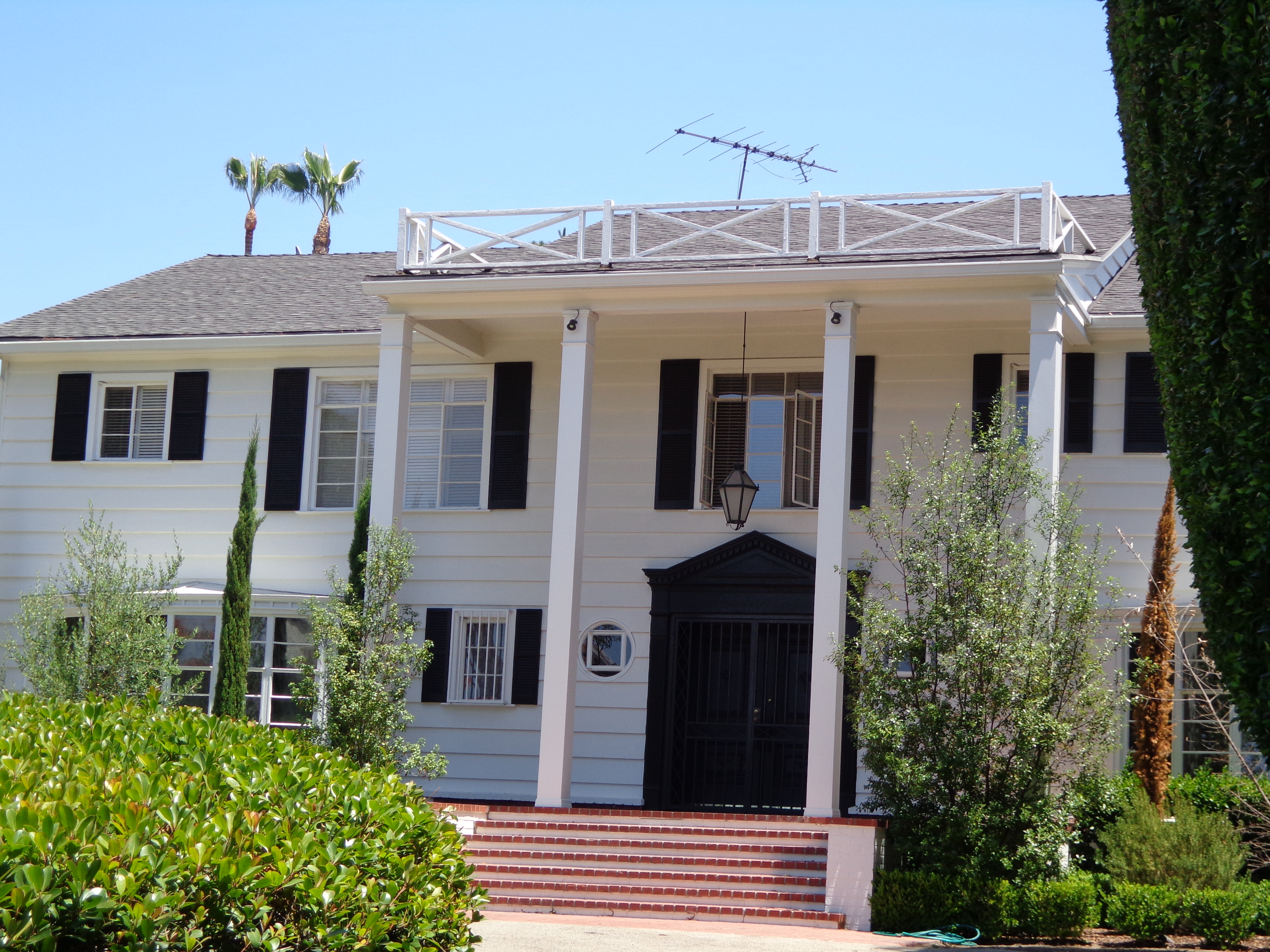
Another Hancock Park Southern Colonial.

In the example on the left, the Southern Colonial has a semi-circular colonnade and portico with six columns. Instead of evenly spaced columns around the semi-circle, there are two sets of closely spaced double columns in front, quite an unusual but creative design, followed by two sets of single columns on the right and left to complete the semi-circle.

In the example on the right, the Southern colonial has seven steps leading up to a raised portico that does not extend completely along the length of the front elevation.

It is also typical in Southern Colonial homes to have a crown over the colonnade. In the first example on the left, vertical rails crown the semi-circular colonnade. In the second example on the right, the crown consists of diagonal cross bracing across the length of the colonnade.

=== The Kendall Glendale Estate ===
A residential example is the Kendall Estate in Glendale nicknamed "Kolonialvu," which the Los Angeles Times describes as reminiscent of Tara, and "practically begs visitors to sip mint juleps in a decidedly Southern - and Southern California - setting," according to an LA Times Home of the Week review in 2008. It was designed and built by Paul M. Baer in 1932 and purchased by Henry E. Kendall, who was an owner of JC Penney's. It is also notable for its award-winning garden. All of its elements are faithful to the typical Southern Colonial style used as a residence. It has symmetry, shuttered colonial windows on both sides of a central door, and extensive use of wooden moldings and brass hardware throughout the house. Similar to the Georgetown Building's design, and to its inspiration, George Washington's residence at Mount Vernon, the Glendale southern colonial home also has a colonnade running across the entire front facade. Mount Vernon has eight columns in total, while both the Georgetown Building and the Glendale estate have six columns each comprising their colonnades. The Glendale estate also contains oval windows, a Southern Colonial element also present in the Georgetown Building.

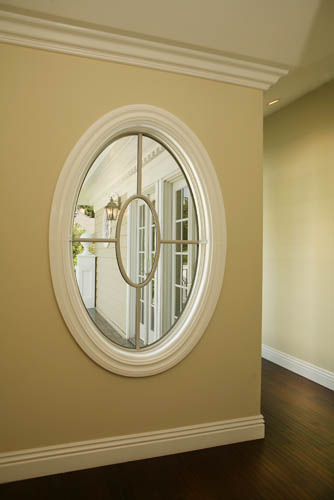
Oval windows at the Kolonialvu estate in Glendale, a characteristic element of Southern Colonial style, similarly present in the Georgetown Building.

=== The Bing Crosby Toluca Lake Mansion ===
In 1936, the actor Bing Crosby built a Southern Colonial home in a four-acre walnut grove in Toluca Lake in the San Fernando Valley region of the city of Los Angeles, California. It was described by noted Architectural Digest writer Steve Vaught as "reminiscent of the great Southern plantations from that civilization gone with the wind, although in many respects it resembled George Washington's Mount Vernon estate. As with Mount Vernon, the Crosby home was graced by a sweeping colonnade running the entire length of the front facade." The house was virtually destroyed by fire due to faulty Christmas tree lights in 1943, but was later restored by subsequent owners. The original house had 6 columns across the entire front of the house, but subsequent renovations contain only four columns.
