= Donegal =

Donegal may refer to:

== Ireland ==
- County Donegal, a county in the Republic of Ireland, part of the province of Ulster
- Donegal (town), a town in County Donegal in Ulster, Ireland
- Donegal Bay, an inlet in the northwest of Ireland bordering counties Donegal, Leitrim and Sligo
- Donegal County Council, the authority responsible for local government in County Donegal
- Donegal Castle, a castle in Donegal Town in County Donegal
- Donegal Airport, an airport in north-west County Donegal
- Donegal GAA, County Board responsible for Gaelic games in County Donegal
  - Donegal county football team
- Donegal (Dáil constituency), a parliamentary constituency in the lower house of the Irish parliament since 2016

=== House of Commons constituencies ===
- County Donegal (UK Parliament constituency)
- Donegal Borough (Parliament of Ireland constituency), a constituency represented in the Irish House of Commons until 1800
- County Donegal (Parliament of Ireland constituency), a constituency represented in the Irish House of Commons until 1800
- East Donegal (UK Parliament constituency)
- North Donegal
- South Donegal
- West Donegal (UK Parliament constituency)

== Canada ==
- Donegal, Perth County, Ontario
- Donegal, Renfew County, Ontario, in Bonnechere Valley

== United States ==
- Donegal, Pennsylvania, a borough in Westmoreland County, Pennsylvania
- Donegal School District, a public school district in Lancaster County, Pennsylvania
- Donegal Township, Butler County, Pennsylvania
- Donegal Township, Washington County, Pennsylvania
- Donegal Township, Westmoreland County, Pennsylvania
- East Donegal Township, Lancaster County, Pennsylvania
- West Donegal Township, Pennsylvania

== Other ==
- HMS Donegal (1798), a 74-gun ship of the line
- HMS Donegal (1858), a 101-gun screw-driven first rate ship of the line
- SS Donegal, Midland Railway passenger ferry ship launched in 1904 and sunk in 1917
- Donegal tweed, a handwoven tweed manufactured in County Donegal
- Donegal Carpets, a brand of handmade wool carpets
- Donegal Creameries, dairy company with operations in Ireland, Britain, the Netherlands and Brazil.
- Donegal Wilson, Canadian politician.

== See also ==
- Donegall (disambiguation)
