= Pennsylvania House of Representatives, District 98 =

American legislative district

Pennsylvania's 98th State House of Representatives district
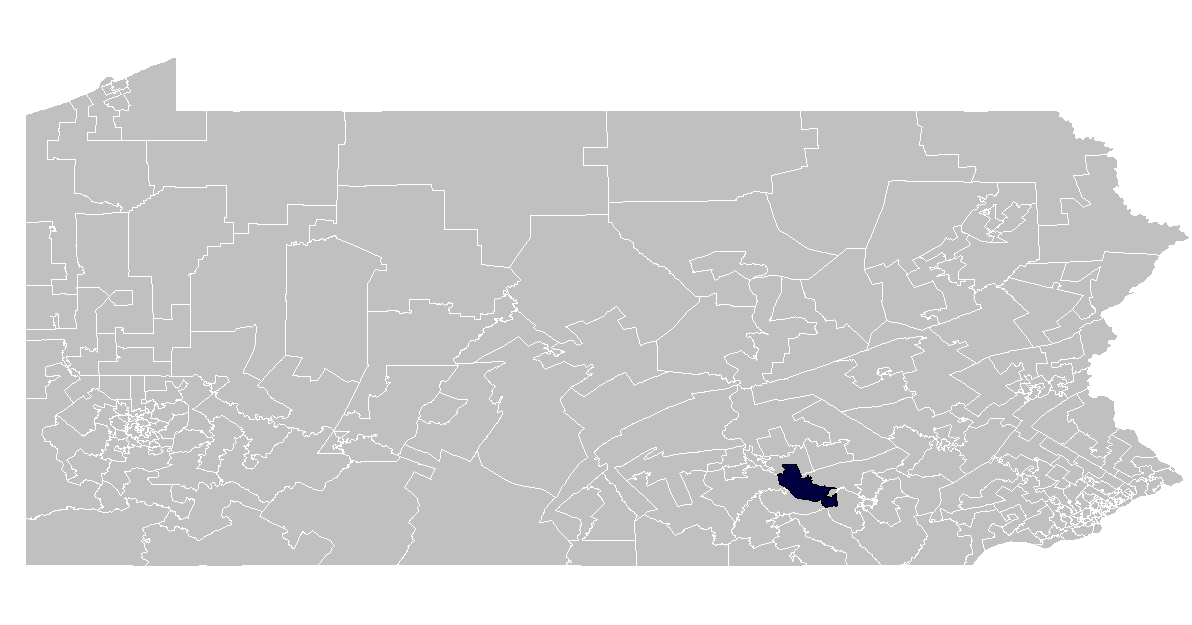
Representative
Tom Jones; R–East Donegal Township
- Demographics: 93.3% White; 2.2% Black; 5.7% Hispanic
- Population (2011) • Citizens of voting age: 62,313; 48,118

The 98th Pennsylvania House of Representatives District is located in Lebanon County and Lancaster County. Before the redistricting process in 2022, the district included parts of Dauphin County. Its former area included the following areas:

- Dauphin County
  - Londonderry Township
- Lancaster County
  - Columbia
  - Conoy Township
  - East Donegal Township
  - Elizabethtown
- Lancaster County (continued)
  - Marietta
  - Mount Joy
  - West Donegal Township
  - West Hempfield Township (PART)
    - District Farmdale
    - District Ironville

== Representatives ==
Representative	Party	Years	District home	Note
Prior to 1969, seats were apportioned by county.
Jack B. Horner	Republican	1969 – 1972		
Kenneth E. Brandt	Republican	1973 – 1990		
Thomas E. Armstrong	Republican	1991 – 2002		
David Hickernell	Republican	2003 – 2023	West Donegal Township	
Tom Jones	Republican	2023 – present	East Donegal Township	Incumbent

== Recent election results ==
PA House election, 2010: Pennsylvania House, District 98
Party	Candidate	Votes	%	±%
Republican	David Hickernell	15,756	100	
Turnout		15,756	100	

PA House election, 2012: Pennsylvania House, District 98
Party	Candidate	Votes	%	±%
Republican	David Hickernell	21,443	100	
Turnout		21,443	100	

PA House election, 2014: Pennsylvania House, District 98
Party	Candidate	Votes	%	±%
Republican	David Hickernell	12,063	69.2	−30.8
Democratic	Anthony Thomas Crocamo	4,699	26.96	+26.96
Green	Ryan Hazel	669	3.84	+3.84
Margin of victory		7,364	42.24	
Turnout		17,431	100	

PA House election, 2016: Pennsylvania House, District 98
Party	Candidate	Votes	%	±%
Republican	David Hickernell	23,545	100	+30.8
Turnout		23,545	100	

PA House election, 2018: Pennsylvania House, District 98
Party	Candidate	Votes	%	±%
Republican	David Hickernell	15,577	64.49	−35.51
Democratic	Mary Auker-Endres	7,993	33.09	+33.09
Libertarian	James Miller	584	2.41	+2.41
Margin of victory		7,644	31.40	−31.40
Turnout		24,154	100	

PA House election, 2020: Pennsylvania House, District 98
Party	Candidate	Votes	%	±%
Republican	David Hickernell	22,412	66.61	+2.12
Democratic	Bill Troutman	11,235	33.39	+0.3
Margin of victory		11,177	33.22	+1.82
Turnout		33,647	100	

PA House election, 2022: Pennsylvania House, District 98
Party	Candidate	Votes	%	±%
Republican	Tom Jones	18,910	61.87	−4.74
Democratic	Mark Temons	10,718	35.07	+1.68
Libertarian	Joshua Gerber	937	3.06	+3.06
Margin of victory		8,192	26.8	−6.42
Turnout		30,565	100	
