= Kenneth Brandt =

American businessman and politician

Kenneth E. Brandt

Member of the Pennsylvania House of Representatives from the 98th district
- In office 1973–1990
- Preceded by: Jack B. Horner
- Succeeded by: Thomas E. Armstrong

Personal details
- Born: November 17, 1938 Elizabethtown, Pennsylvania, U.S.
- Died: October 20, 2016 (aged 77) Elizabethtown, Pennsylvania, U.S.
- Party: Republican

Kenneth Ebersole Brandt (November 17, 1938 – October 20, 2016) was an American businessman and politician.

Born in Elizabethtown, Pennsylvania, Brandt graduated from Elizabethtown Area High School. He owned A.F. Brandt & Sons Rendering. He served on the Elizabethtown Area School Board. He served in the Pennsylvania House of Representatives from 1973 to 1990 and was a member of the Republican Party.
