= Donegal School District =

School district in Pennsylvania

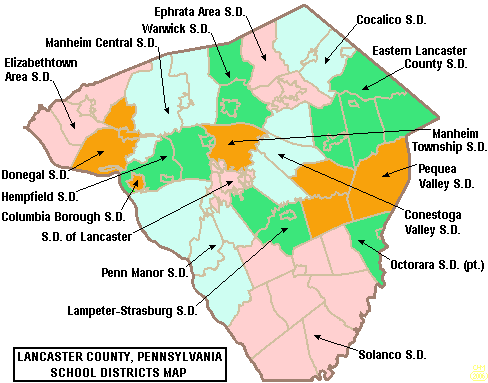
- Map of Lancaster County, Pennsylvania public school districts. Donegal School District is the large orange area to the left (west) side of the map.

Address
- 1051 Koser Road Marietta Mount Joy Anderson Ferry RD. Junior High Mount Joy, Lancaster, Pennsylvania, 17552; United States

District information
- Type: Public
- Grades: K-12
- Established: 1954
- Superintendent: Gregory Kiehl

Students and staff
- Enrolment: 3013
- Faculty: 203
- District mascot: Indian
- Colors: Green and white

Other information
- Website: www.donegalsd.org

The Donegal School District is a school district covering the Boroughs of Marietta and Mount Joy and East Donegal Township and the southern portion of Mount Joy Township in Lancaster County, Pennsylvania, United States. It is a member of Lancaster-Lebanon Intermediate Unit (IU) 13. The district operates one high school, one junior high school, one intermediate school, and one primary school.

== Schools ==
- Donegal Primary School K–2 (formerly Donegal Springs Elementary School), Mount Joy, Pennsylvania
- Donegal Intermediate School 3–6 (formerly Donegal Middle School and Riverview Elementary School), Marietta, Pennsylvania
- Donegal Junior High School 7–8 (formerly Donegal High School), Mount Joy, Pennsylvania
- Donegal High School 9–12, Mount Joy, Pennsylvania

== Notable alumni ==
- David Hickernell, former state representative
- Mike Sarbaugh, MLB coach
- Swerve Strickland, professional wrestler
- Bruce Sutter, former Major League Baseball relief pitcher
