= Donegal High School =

Coordinates: 40.0962°N 76.5130°W

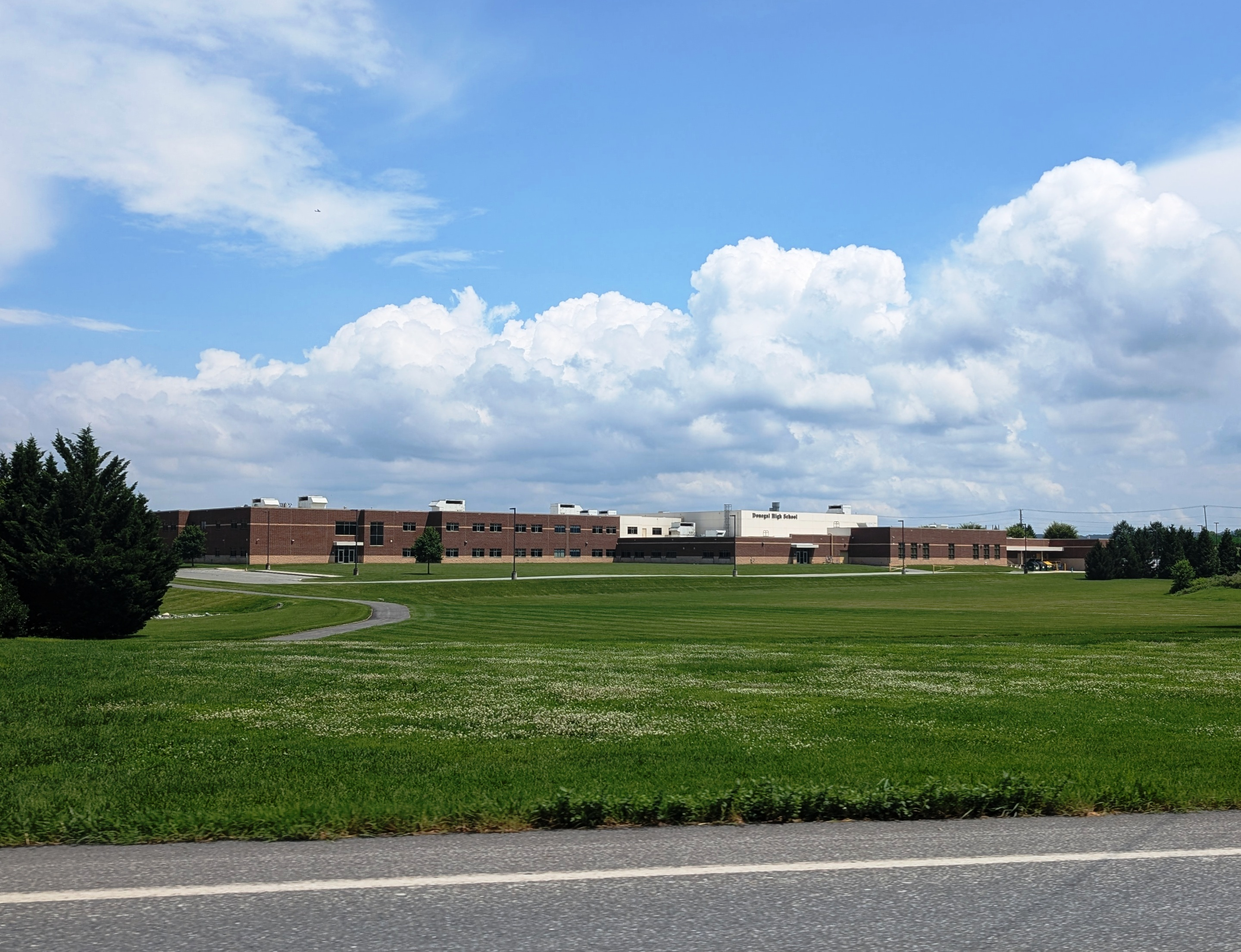

Location
- 1025 Koser Rd, Mount Joy, PA 17552

Information
- Established: 1954
- School district: Donegal School District
- Principal: John Haldeman
- Teaching staff: 56.80 (FTE)
- Enrollment: 923 (2023–2024)
- Student to teacher ratio: 16.25
- Color
- Team name: Indians
- Website: dhs.donegalsd.org

Donegal High School is a public high school located in Mount Joy, Pennsylvania, United States. It is the sole high school in the Donegal School District. Attendance was 854 in 2017.

== History ==
In 1954, Donegal High School was formed by the combination of the East Donegal Township, Mount Joy, Marietta, and Mount Joy Township high schools. The building was built in 1954 at the intersections of PA-772 and Union School Road. This remained as the high school until 2012, when a new building was built on nearby Koser Road. The former building remains in use as Donegal Junior High School.

== Notable alumni ==
- Chris Heisey, former MLB outfielder
- David Hickernell, State representative
- Clarence Charles Newcomer (1923–2005), US district judge of the United States District Court for the Eastern District of Pennsylvania
- Mike Sarbaugh, MLB coach
- Swerve Strickland, professional wrestler
- Bruce Sutter, MLB Hall of Fame pitcher
