= Joseph Bucher House =

Historic house in Pennsylvania, United States

- U.S. National Register of Historic Places
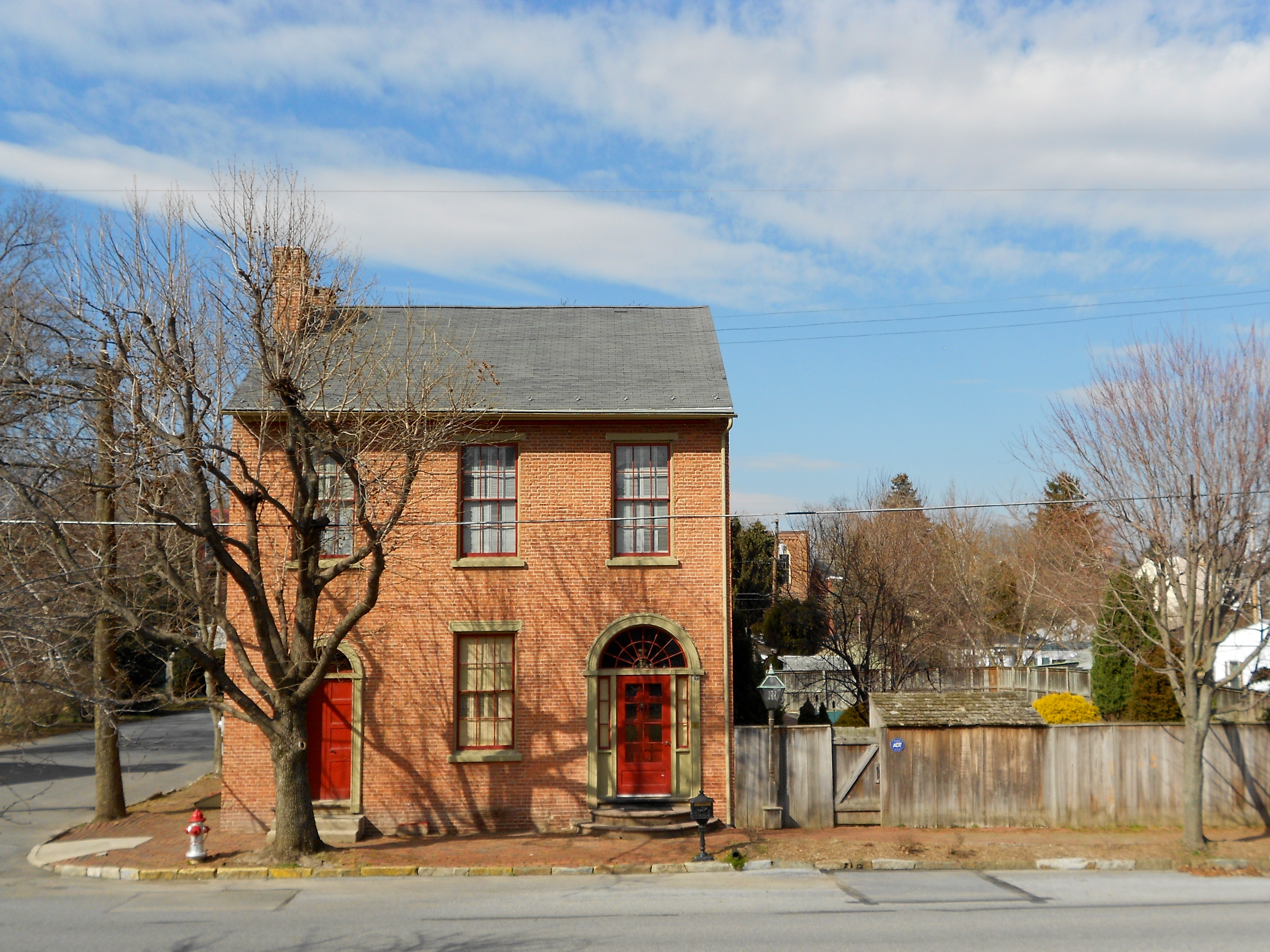
- Joseph Bucher House, February 2012

- Location within Pennsylvania Location within the United States
- Location: 104 E. Front St, Marietta, Pennsylvania
- Coordinates: 40°3′19″N 76°33′17″W
- Area: 0.1 acres (0.040 ha)
- Built: c. 1806–1811
- Architectural style: Georgian
- NRHP reference No.: 79002260
- Added to NRHP: September 7, 1979

Joseph Bucher House is a historic home located at Marietta, Lancaster County, Pennsylvania. It was built between about 1806 and 1811, and is a 2 1/2-story, three bay brick dwelling. It has a "side hall" Georgian plan.

It was listed on the National Register of Historic Places in 1979.
