= Jack B. Horner =

American politician

Member of the Pennsylvania House of Representatives from the 98th district
- In office 1969–1972
- Preceded by: District created
- Succeeded by: Kenneth Brandt

Member of the Pennsylvania House of Representatives from the Lancaster County district
- In office 1965–1968

Personal details
- Born: March 24, 1922 Elizabethtown, Pennsylvania, U.S.
- Died: July 10, 2009 (aged 87) Lancaster, Pennsylvania, U.S.
- Party: Republican

Jack B. Horner (March 24, 1922 – July 10, 2009) was a Republican member of the Pennsylvania House of Representatives.

Horner was a graduate of Colgate University and Dickinson School of Law. During World War II he served in the Unitecd States Army Air Forces. He first served in elected office as a member of the Elizabethtown Area School Board. He served four terms in the state legislature from 1965-1973.
