= Marietta Historic District (Marietta, Pennsylvania) =

Historic district in Pennsylvania, United States

- U.S. National Register of Historic Places
- U.S. Historic district
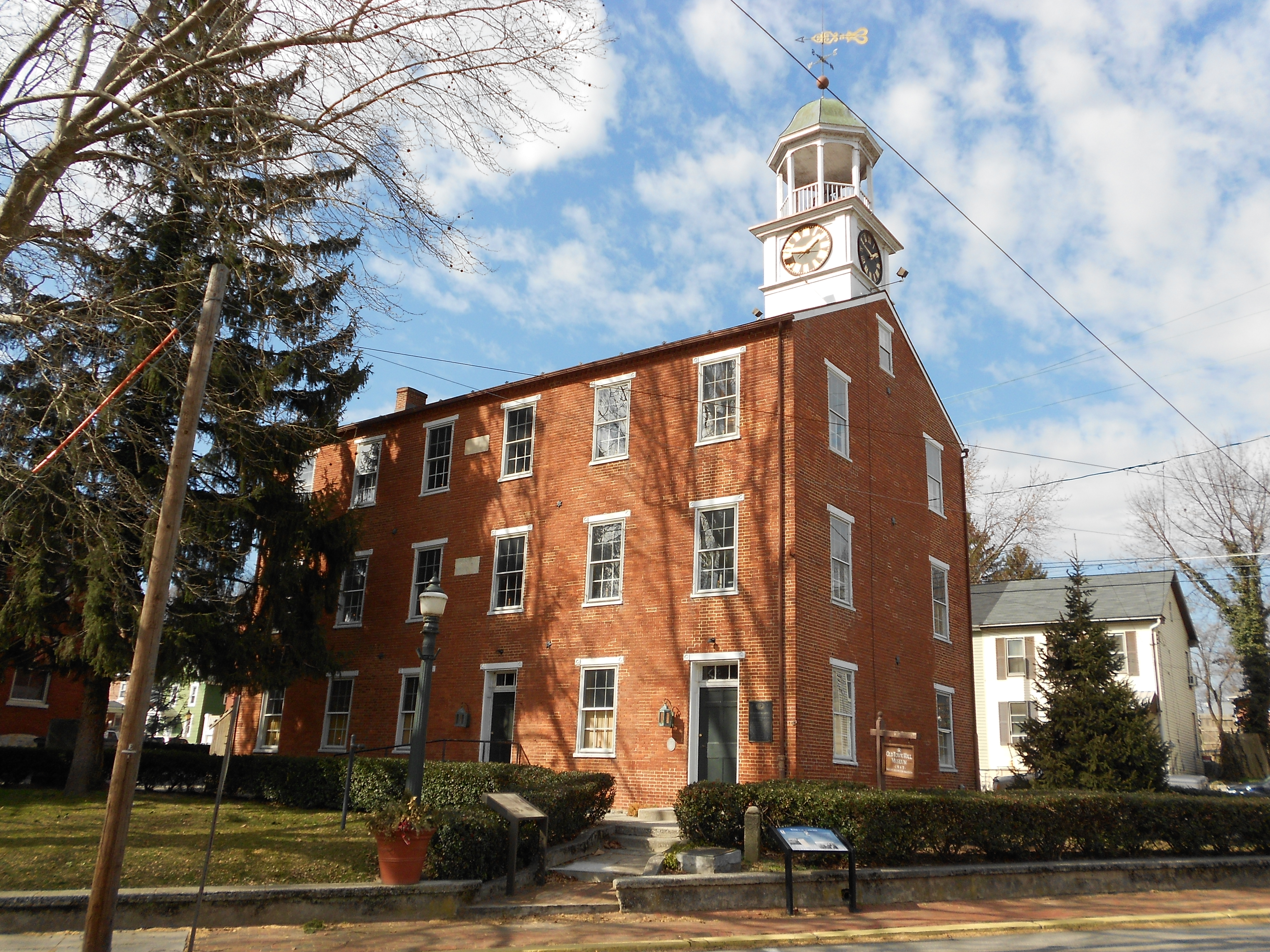
- Old Town Hall

- Location within Pennsylvania Location within the United States
- Location: Roughly bounded by Market, Front, Biddle, and Waterford Sts., Marietta, Pennsylvania
- Coordinates: 40°03′22″N 76°33′28″W
- Area: 242.4 acres (98.1 ha)
- Architectural style: Italianate, Federal
- NRHP reference No.: 78002417, 84003446 (Boundary Increase)
- Added to NRHP: July 18, 1978, August 17, 1984 (Boundary Increase)

The Marietta Historic District is a national historic district that is located in Marietta, Lancaster County, Pennsylvania.

It was listed on the National Register of Historic Places in 1978, with a boundary increase in 1984.

== History and architectural features ==
This district includes 373 contributing buildings that are located in the central business district and surrounding residential areas of Marietta and are notable examples of the Italianate and Federal architectural styles. Notable buildings include the Duffy House, Marietta Community Center, Shelly House, the Pierre de Vittry House (c. 1825), Marietta Theater, First Farmers' Bank, David Smith House, English Presbyterian Church (1853, 1898, 1909), Liquor Control Board Office, the Railroad Hotel, Union House Gallery, Eckmans Hotel, White Swan Inn, Henry Musselman House, former Grove Hotel, and the Old Town Hall.
