= Linden House (Marietta, Pennsylvania) =

Historic house in Pennsylvania, United States

- U.S. National Register of Historic Places
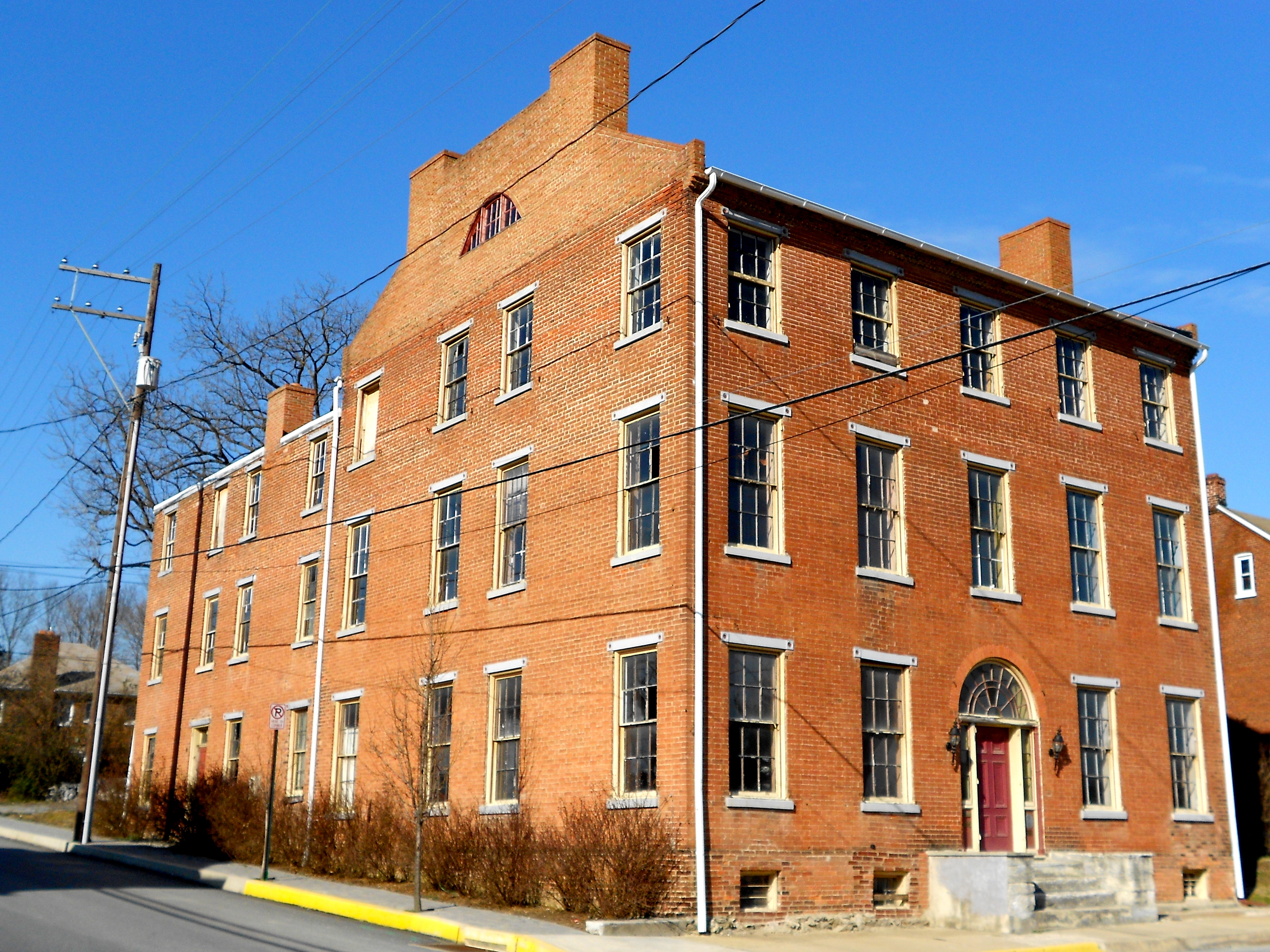
- Linden House, February 2012

- Location within Pennsylvania Location within the United States
- Location: 606 E. Market St., Marietta, Pennsylvania
- Coordinates: 40°3′35″N 76°32′30″W
- Area: 0.3 acres (0.12 ha)
- Built: c. 1813-1814
- Architectural style: Federal
- NRHP reference No.: 83002254
- Added to NRHP: January 6, 1983

Linden House is a historic home located at Marietta, Lancaster County, Pennsylvania. It was built about 1813–1814, and is a three-story, five-bay, L-shaped brick dwelling in the Federal style. In the 1840s, the house was occupied by a boys' boarding school.

It was listed on the National Register of Historic Places in 1983.
