= Donegall =

Donegall may refer to:

- Donegall Lectureship at Trinity College Dublin, lectureship in mathematics at TCD
- Donegall Square, a square in the centre of Belfast, County Antrim, Northern Ireland
- Donegall Road, a residential area and road thoroughfare in west Belfast
- Donegall Arms shooting, attack by a small Irish Republican paramilitary group in December 1991
- Donegall Pass, a place on the Ormeau Road in south Belfast
- Marquess of Donegall, Irish peerages associated with County Donegal
- Donegall Street bombing, Provisional IRA car bombing in Belfast on 20 March, 1972

== See also ==
- Donegal (disambiguation)
