= Thomas E. Armstrong =

American politician

Member of the Pennsylvania House of Representatives from the 98th district
- In office January 1, 1991 – November 30, 2002
- Preceded by: Kenneth E. Brandt
- Succeeded by: David Hickernell

Personal details
- Born: January 22, 1959 (age 67) Prescott, Arizona
- Party: Republican
- Spouse: Janice Christine
- Education: Penn State University

Thomas E. Armstrong (born January 22, 1959) is a former Republican member of the Pennsylvania House of Representatives.

Armstrong graduated from Conestoga Valley High School in 1977 and earned a degree in business from Penn State University in 1980. He was first elected to represent the 98th legislative district in the Pennsylvania House of Representatives in 1990. He was defeated in the 2002 Republican primary by David Hickernell.
