= Tom Jones (Pennsylvania politician) =

American politician

Member of the Pennsylvania House of Representatives from the 98th district
- Incumbent
- Assumed office January 3, 2023
- Preceded by: David Hickernell

Personal details
- Party: Republican
- Spouse: Rochelle M. Jones
- Education: Lancaster Catholic High School

Tom Jones is an American politician currently representing the 98th district of the Pennsylvania House of Representatives as a Republican.

== Early life ==
Jones graduated from the Lancaster Catholic High School in 1992. Jones self-employed himself in his landscaping business.

== Political career ==
Jones first became involved in politics when he was elected the East Donegal Township supervisor. He ran for the 98th district following the retirement of David Hickernell and would defeat two other candidates in the primary. He would go on to defeat Democrat Mark Temons, a tradesman and small business owner, and Libertarian Josh Gerber, by a 27-point margin. In 2025, Jones declared his intent to run for the Pennsylvania Senate seat currently occupied by Democrat James Malone. He is a member of the Pennsylvania Freedom Caucus.

== Political positions ==
=== Abortion and birth control ===
Jones opposes abortion and is in favor of banning it in the state of Pennsylvania. He opposes requiring health insurance companies to cover birth control.

=== Gun control ===
Jones opposes gun control measures, including background checks. As of October 2024, he had an "A" rating and endorsement from the NRA Political Victory Fund (NRA-PVF).

=== LGBT rights ===
Jones opposes same-sex marriage, supports restricting transgender student athletes to participating on the team of their biological sex, and supports banning discussion of LGBT topics and books covering such in Pennsylvania schools.

=== Voting rights ===
Jones opposes Governor Josh Shapiro's automatic voter registration program, and a federal judge dismissed a lawsuit by Jones and others to eliminate the program. He supports making it mandatory for every voter to show an ID before voting, and is in favor of banning mail-in ballots.

== Election results ==
=== 2022 ===
PA House election, 2022 Republican Primary: Pennsylvania House, District 98
Party	Candidate	Votes	%
Republican	Tom Jones	5,935	50.25
Republican	Lu Ann Fahndrich	3,292	27.87
Republican	Faith Bucks	2,566	21.73
Margin of victory		2,643	22.38
Turnout		11,793	100

PA House election, 2022: Pennsylvania House, District 98
Party	Candidate	Votes	%	±%
Republican	Tom Jones	18,910	61.87	▼4.74
Democratic	Mark Temons	10,718	35.07	▲1.68
Libertarian	Joshua Gerber	937	3.06	▲3.06
Margin of victory		8,192	26.8	▼6.42
Turnout		30,565	100	

=== 2024 ===
PA House election, 2024 Republican Primary: Pennsylvania House, District 98
Party	Candidate	Votes	%	±%
Republican	Tom Jones	5,646	98.79	▲48.54
Republican	Write-in	69	1.21	
Margin of victory		5,577	97.58	▲75.2
Turnout		5,715	100	

PA House election, 2024: Pennsylvania House, District 98
Party	Candidate	Votes	%	±%
Republican	Tom Jones	19,799	64.31	▲2.44
Democratic	Lynn McCleary	10,939	35.53	▲0.46
Write-in		48	0.16	
Margin of victory		8,860	28.78	▲1.96
Turnout		30,786		
