= David Hickernell =

American politician

David S. Hickernell

Member of the Pennsylvania House of Representatives from the 98th district
- In office January 7, 2003 – January 3, 2023
- Preceded by: Thomas E. Armstrong
- Succeeded by: Tom Jones

Personal details
- Born: January 2, 1959 (age 67) Lancaster, Pennsylvania, United States
- Party: Republican
- Spouse: Karen Hickernell
- Education: Elizabethtown College
- Website: www.rephickernell.com

David S. "Dave" Hickernell (born January 2, 1959) is a Republican former member of the Pennsylvania House of Representatives for the 98th District and was elected in 2002. He previously sat on the House Agriculture and Rural Affairs, Local Government, and Transportation Committees.

== Personal ==
Hickernell is a native of Marietta, Pennsylvania. Hickernell graduated from Donegal High School in 1977. Hickernell graduated from Elizabethtown College in 1983.

He worked several positions in the House Republican caucus, including as a legislative assistant, as Director of the House Policy Committee, as Executive Director for the Majority Whip's Office, and as Executive Assistant to the Majority Appropriations Chairman.

He also was elected to Clerk of Courts in Lancaster County, Pennsylvania.

He was first elected to represent the 98th legislative district in the Pennsylvania House of Representatives in the 2002 election. In 2003, the political website PoliticsPA named him to "The Best of the Freshman Class" list, calling him "the insider of insiders" because of his experience working in the House of Representatives.

Hickernell announced in December 2021 that he would not seek re-election, officially retiring after 20 years as a representative.

== Legislation ==
=== Fostering Independence Through Education Act ===
Hickernell introduced the Fostering Independence Through Education Act in the 2017-2018 legislative session, but the act was not passed into law until 2019. This act provides a fee and tuition waiver for current or former foster children obtaining an undergraduate degree at certain Pennsylvania colleges and universities. In addition, it mandates that institutions of higher education institutions create a point of contact for current and former foster children to help them manage their finances and navigate the university bureaucracy.

=== Promote Work and Community Engagement Among Medical Assistance Beneficiaries ===
Although not the primary sponsor, Hickernell expressed support for this legislation in a press release. The legislation, which was vetoed by Governor Wolf in 2018, would have added a work requirement for those on Medicaid. The work requirement would not affect primary caregivers of children under the age of 6, institutionalized individuals, individuals with disabilities, or full-time high school students.
