= Marietta, Pennsylvania =

Borough in Pennsylvania, US

- Borough
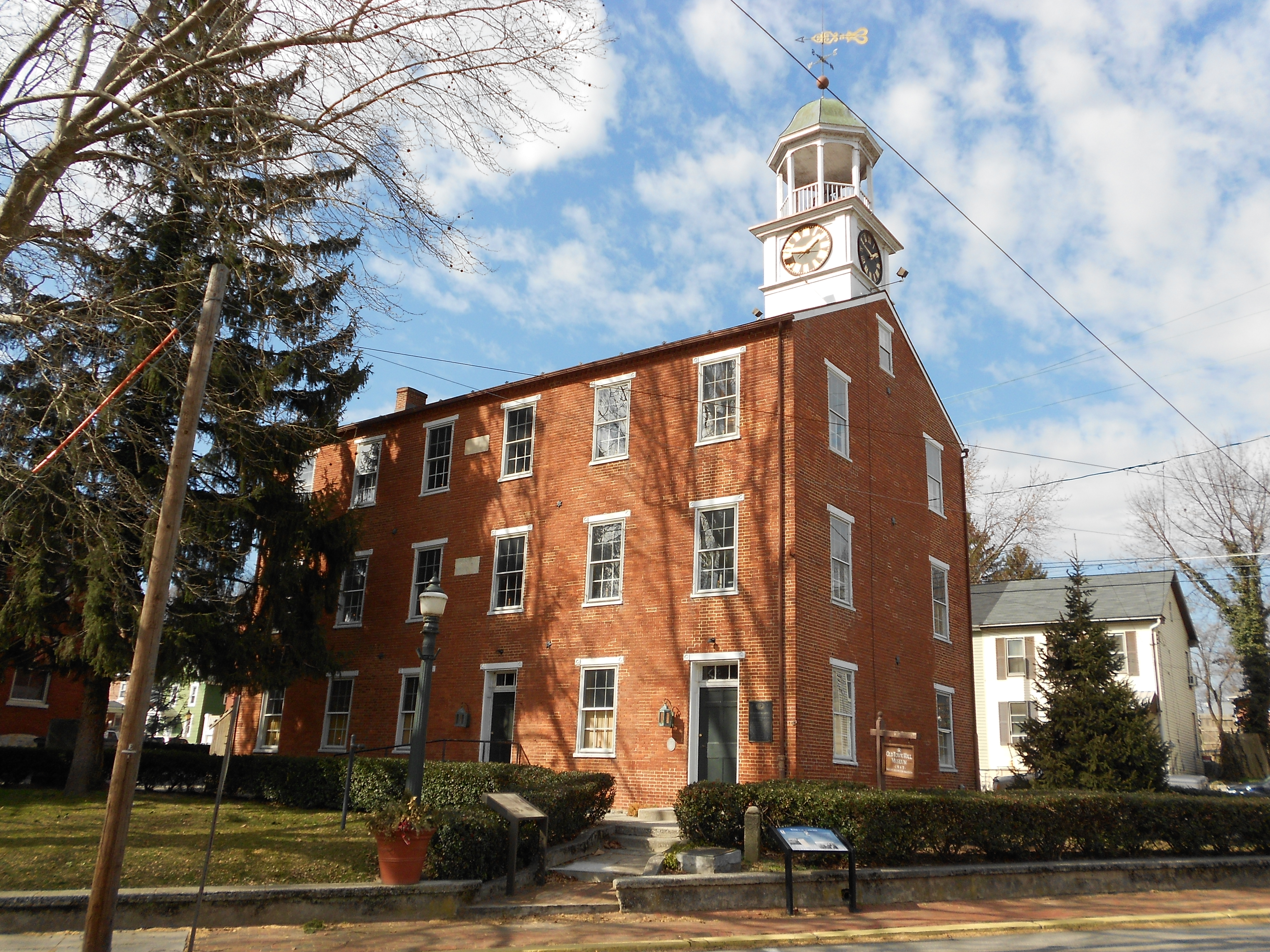
- Old Town Hall

- Location in Lancaster County, Pennsylvania

- Location in Pennsylvania Location in the United States
- Coordinates: 40°03′26″N 76°33′21″W
- Country: United States
- State: Pennsylvania
- County: Lancaster
- Named for: Mary Cook; Etta Anderson

Government
  - Mayor: Rebecca Carroll-Baltozer

Area
  - Total: 0.75 sq mi (1.95 km^{2})
  - Land: 0.75 sq mi (1.93 km^{2})
  - Water: 0.0077 sq mi (0.02 km^{2})
- Elevation: 279 ft (85 m)

Population (2020)
  - Total: 2,623
  - Density: 3,512.2/sq mi (1,356.05/km^{2})
- Time zone: UTC-5 (EST)
  - Summer (DST): UTC-4 (EDT)
- ZIP code: 17547
- Area codes: 717 and 223
- FIPS code: 42-47424
- Website: www.boroughofmarietta.com

Marietta is a borough in Lancaster County, Pennsylvania, United States. The population was 2,633 at the 2020 census. It is located on the east bank of the Susquehanna River, northwest of Columbia.

== Geography ==
Marietta is located in western Lancaster County at 40°3′26″N 76°33′21″W (40.057169, -76.555955). It is bordered to the north, east, and west by East Donegal Township, and to the south, across the Susquehanna River, by Hellam Township in York County.

According to the U.S. Census Bureau, the borough has a total area of 0.75 square miles (1.9 km^{2}), of which 0.007 square miles (0.018 km^{2}), or 0.93%, are water.

Market Street runs the whole length of the town. The east/west divider is Waterford Avenue. Pennsylvania Route 441 passes just north of the borough and forms part of its northeastern border; the highway leads southeast 3.5 miles (5.6 km) to Columbia and northwest (upriver) 15 miles (24 km) to Middletown.

== History ==
In 1727, James Anderson made a lottery that laid out part of present-day Marietta. Later David Cook laid another portion of present-day Marietta. Further development by Jacob Grosh, John Myers, John Peadan, James Mehaffey, Benjamin Long, and James Huffy laid out the rest of present-day Marietta. In 1812, the borough was incorporated, merging all the areas of town except for the western portion of the borough which was extended into Marietta at a later date.

For the first few years of existence, the growth of the borough was meager. Then an economic crisis struck the town, not relenting until around 1830. Thereafter, industries such as timber and iron smelting provided many economic opportunities in the borough.

The borough's name is an amalgamation of the first names of Mary Cook and Henrietta Anderson, the wives of two first settlers.

The Ashley and Bailey Silk Mill, Joseph Bucher House, Chickies Historic District, Linden House, and Marietta Historic District are listed on the National Register of Historic Places.

== Demographics ==
Historical population
Census	Pop.	Note	%±
1840	1,428		—
1850	2,099		47.0%
1860	2,186		4.1%
1870	2,397		9.7%
1880	2,503		4.4%
1890	2,402		−4.0%
1900	2,469		2.8%
1910	2,079		−15.8%
1920	1,735		−16.5%
1930	1,969		13.5%
1940	2,128		8.1%
1950	2,442		14.8%
1960	2,385		−2.3%
1970	2,838		19.0%
1980	2,740		−3.5%
1990	2,778		1.4%
2000	2,689		−3.2%
2010	2,588		−3.8%
2020	2,623		1.4%
2021 (est.)	2,978	▲	13.5%

As of the census of 2000, there were 2,689 people, 1,092 households, and 723 families residing in the borough. The population density was 3,587.0 inhabitants per square mile (1,384.9/km^{2}). There were 1,168 housing units at an average density of 1,558.1 per square mile (601.6/km^{2}). The racial makeup of the borough was 95.83% White, 2.49% African American, 0.15% Native American, 0.15% Asian, 0.04% Pacific Islander, 0.52% from other races, and 0.82% from two or more races. Hispanic or Latino of any race were 1.90% of the population.

There were 1,092 households, out of which 32.2% had children under the age of 18 living with them, 51.3% were married couples living together, 10.7% had a female householder with no husband present, and 33.7% were non-families. 25.8% of all households were made up of individuals, and 7.7% had someone living alone who was 65 years of age or older. The average household size was 2.46 and the average family size was 2.99.

In the borough, the population was spread out, with 24.8% under the age of 18, 8.1% from 18 to 24, 34.3% from 25 to 44, 22.0% from 45 to 64, and 10.8% who were 65 years of age or older. The median age was 36 years. For every 100 females, there were 99.9 males. For every 100 females age 18 and over, there were 97.7 males.

The median income for a household in the borough was $40,563, and the median income for a family was $46,905. Males had a median income of $33,783 versus $21,863 for females. The per capita income for the borough was $19,265. About 6.7% of families and 9.2% of the population were below the poverty line, including 11.8% of those under age 18 and 11.0% of those age 65 or over.

== Government ==
Council member	Party	Electoral history
Glen Mazis	Democrat	Elected ???; Reelected 11/07/2017
Robert W. Shambaugh	Democrat	Elected 11/07/2017
Louis C. McKinney Sr.	Democrat	Elected 11/07/2017
William A. Dalzell Jr.	Democrat	Elected 11/07/2017
Bridey Hannold	Democrat	Elected
Wayne Angelo		Elected
Frederick States		Elected

== Education ==
Primary and secondary education in the borough of Marietta is provided by the Donegal School District. Students kindergarten through second grade attend the Donegal Primary School in Mount Joy. Students third grade through sixth grade attend the Donegal Intermediate School located on PA 441 just outside the borough. Students seventh grade through eighth grade attend the Donegal Junior High School in Mount Joy. Students ninth grade through twelfth grade attend the Donegal High School in Mount Joy.

== Notable people ==
- Henry B. Cassel (1855–1926), Republican member of the U.S. House of Representatives
- Alan Dawson (1929–1996), jazz drummer and percussion teacher based in Boston; born in Marietta
- George Clayton Foulk (1856–1893), U.S. Ambassador to Joseon Korea.
- David Hickernell (b. 1959), Republican member of the Pennsylvania House of Representatives
- Simon Snyder Rathvon (1812–1891), agricultural entomologist
- Barr Spangler (1822-1922) bank president, member of the Prohibition Party and politician.

== Gallery ==
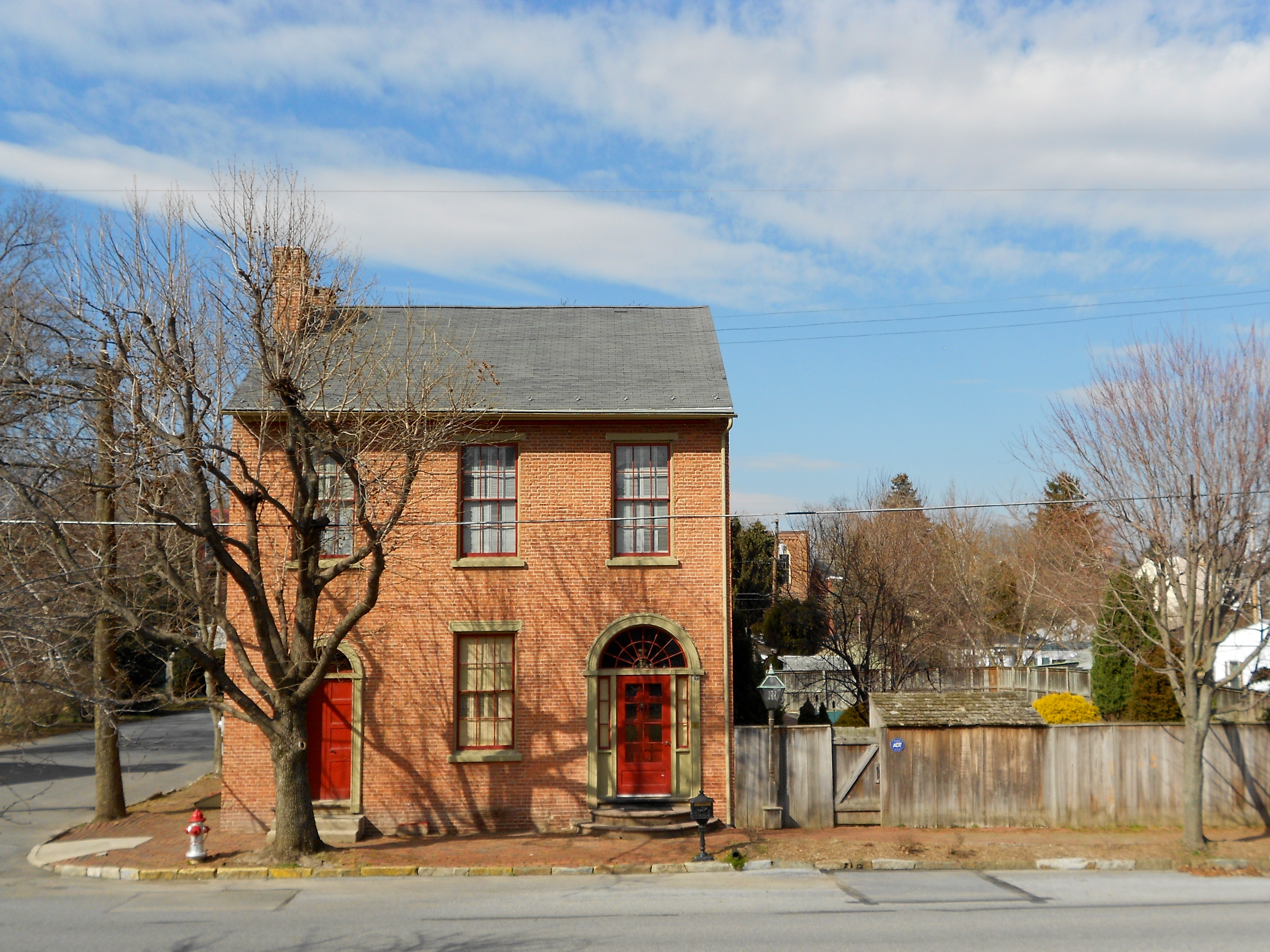
Joseph Bucher House

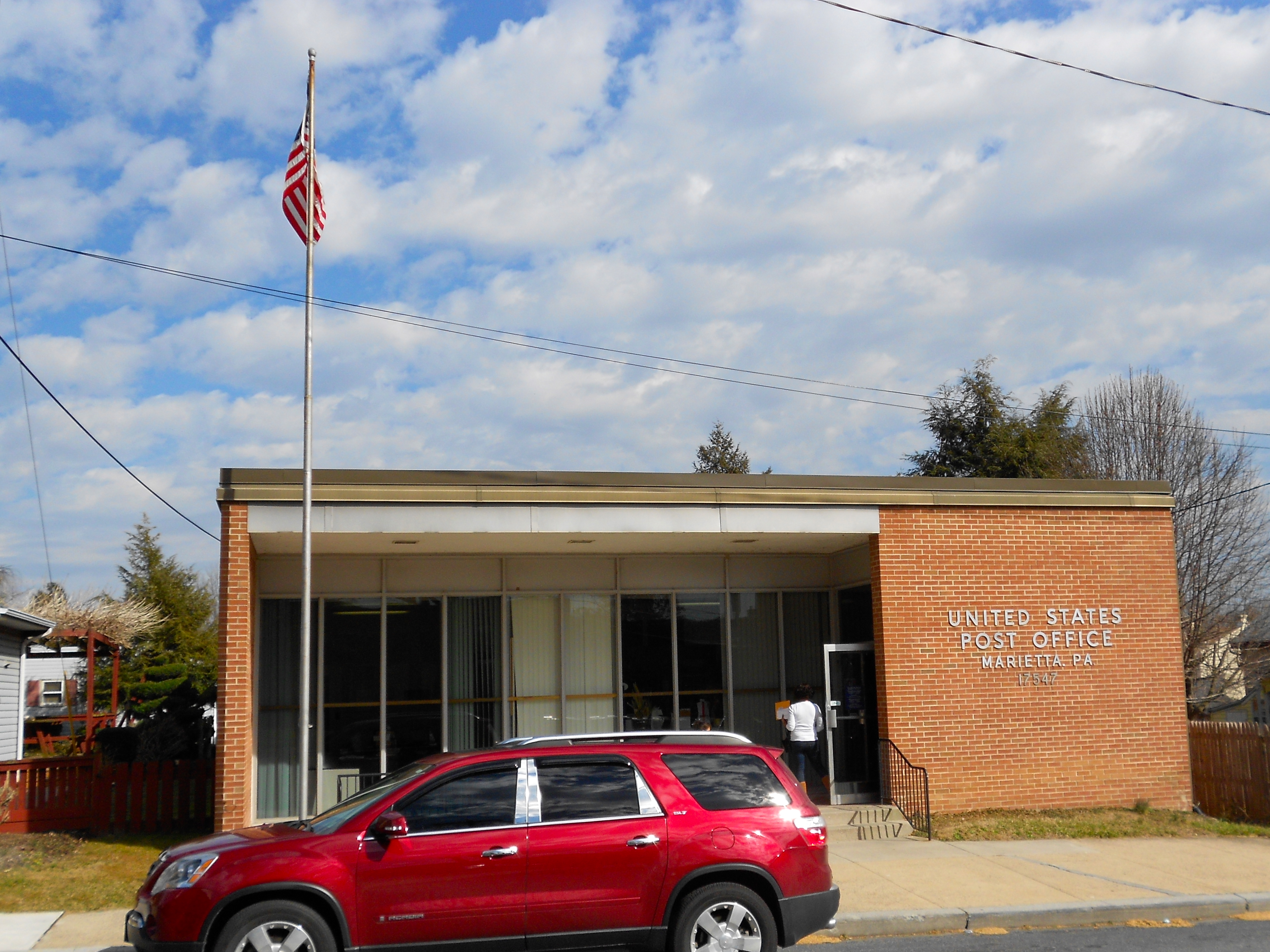
Post office

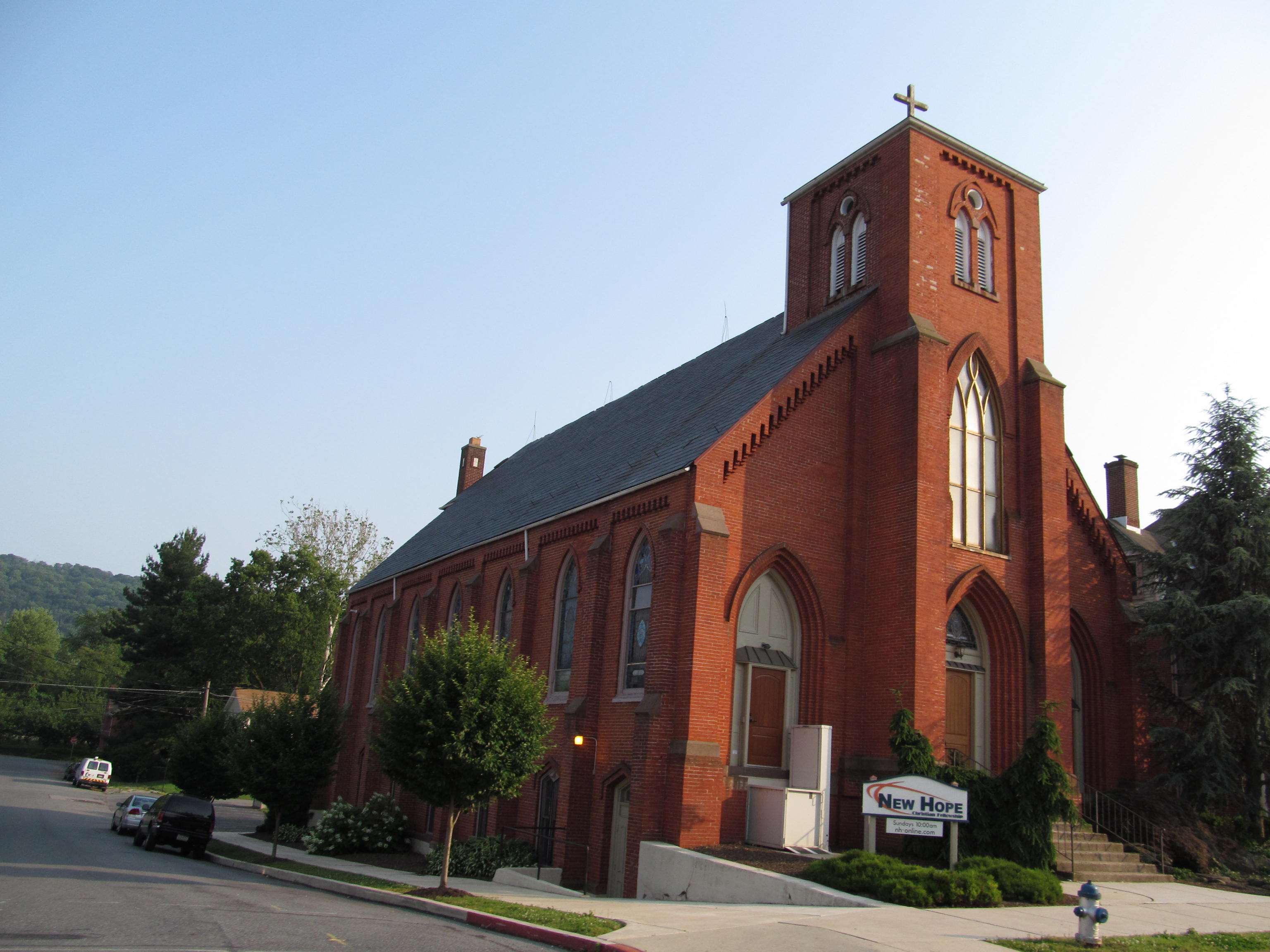

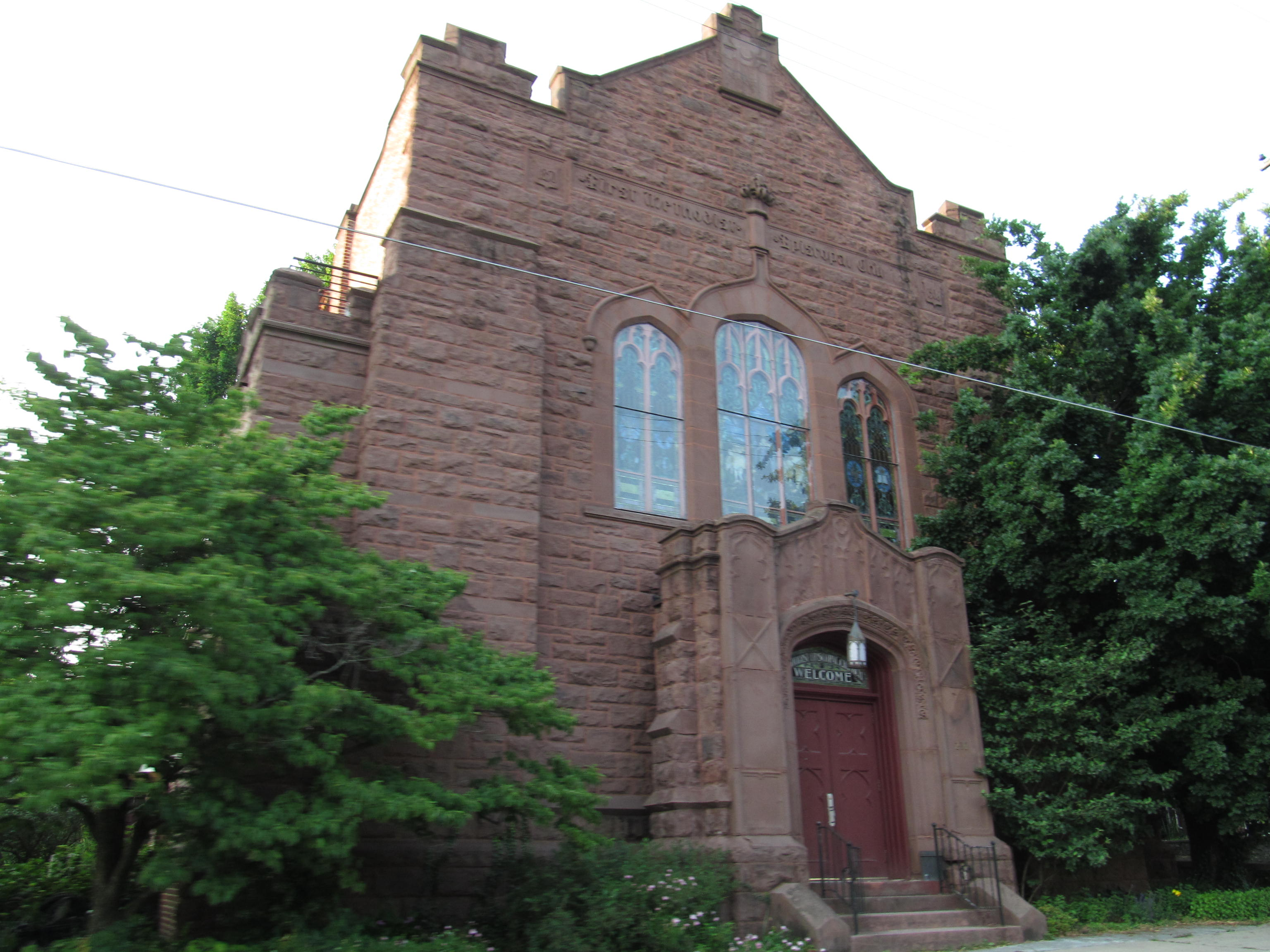

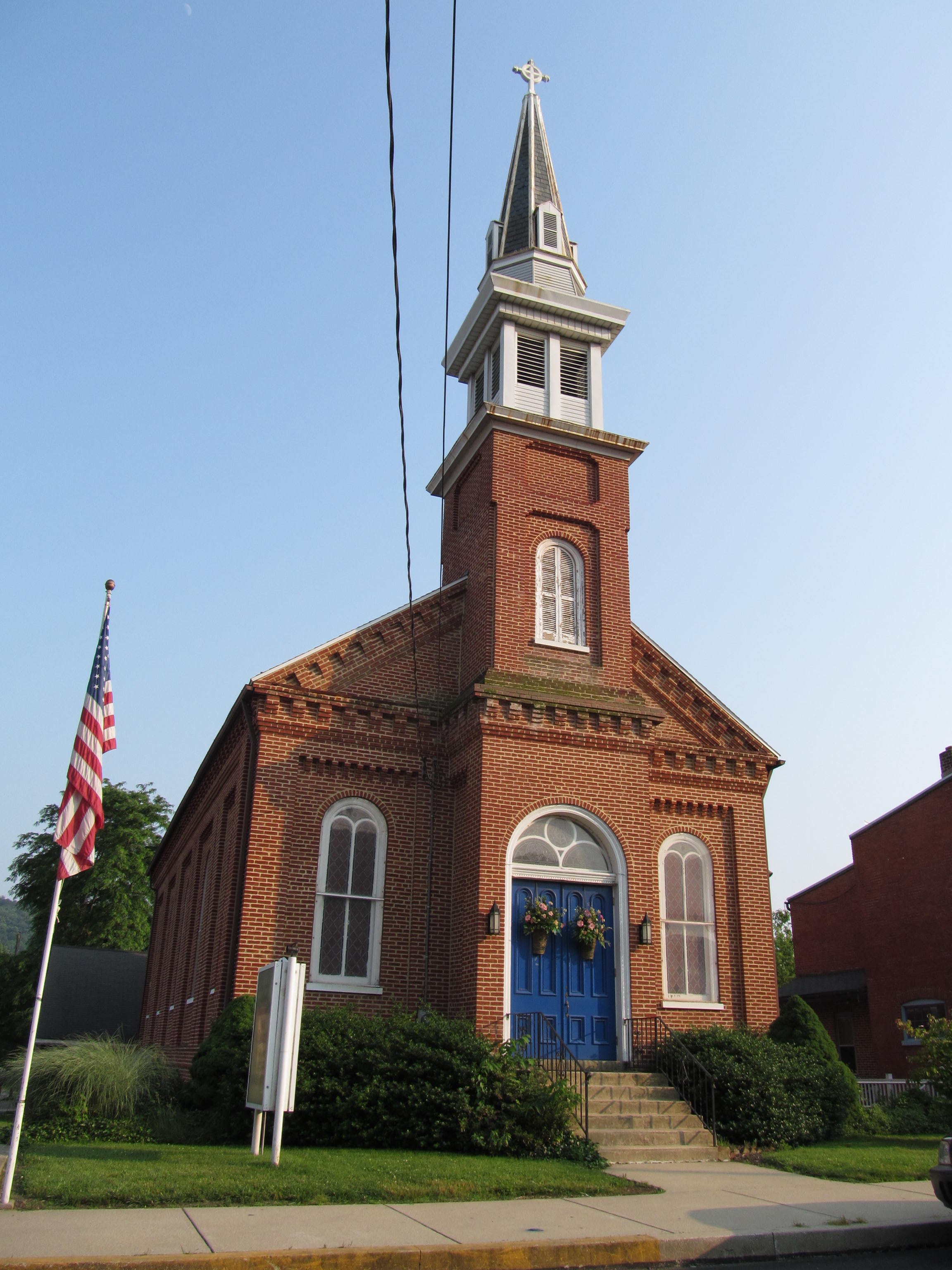

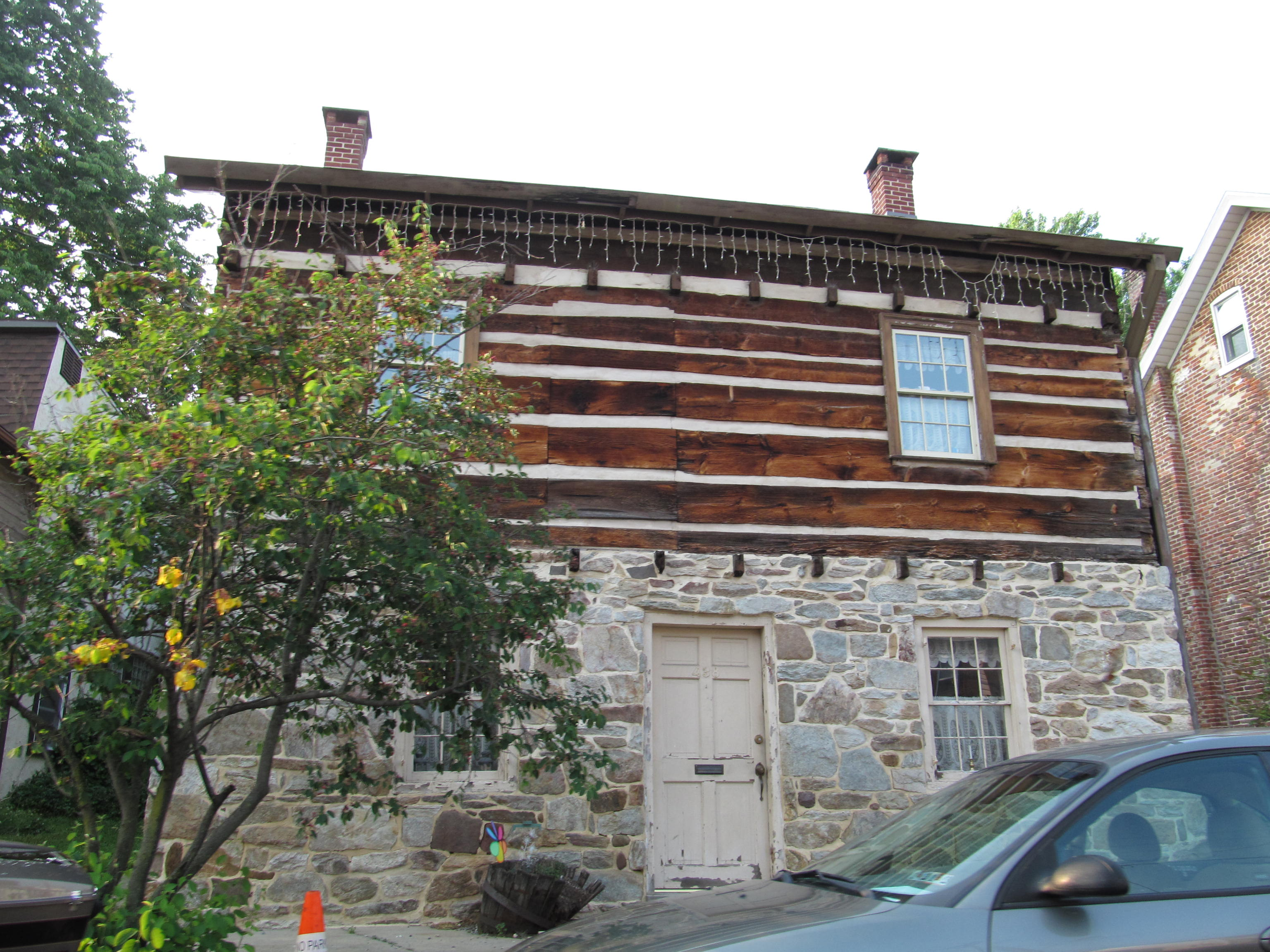

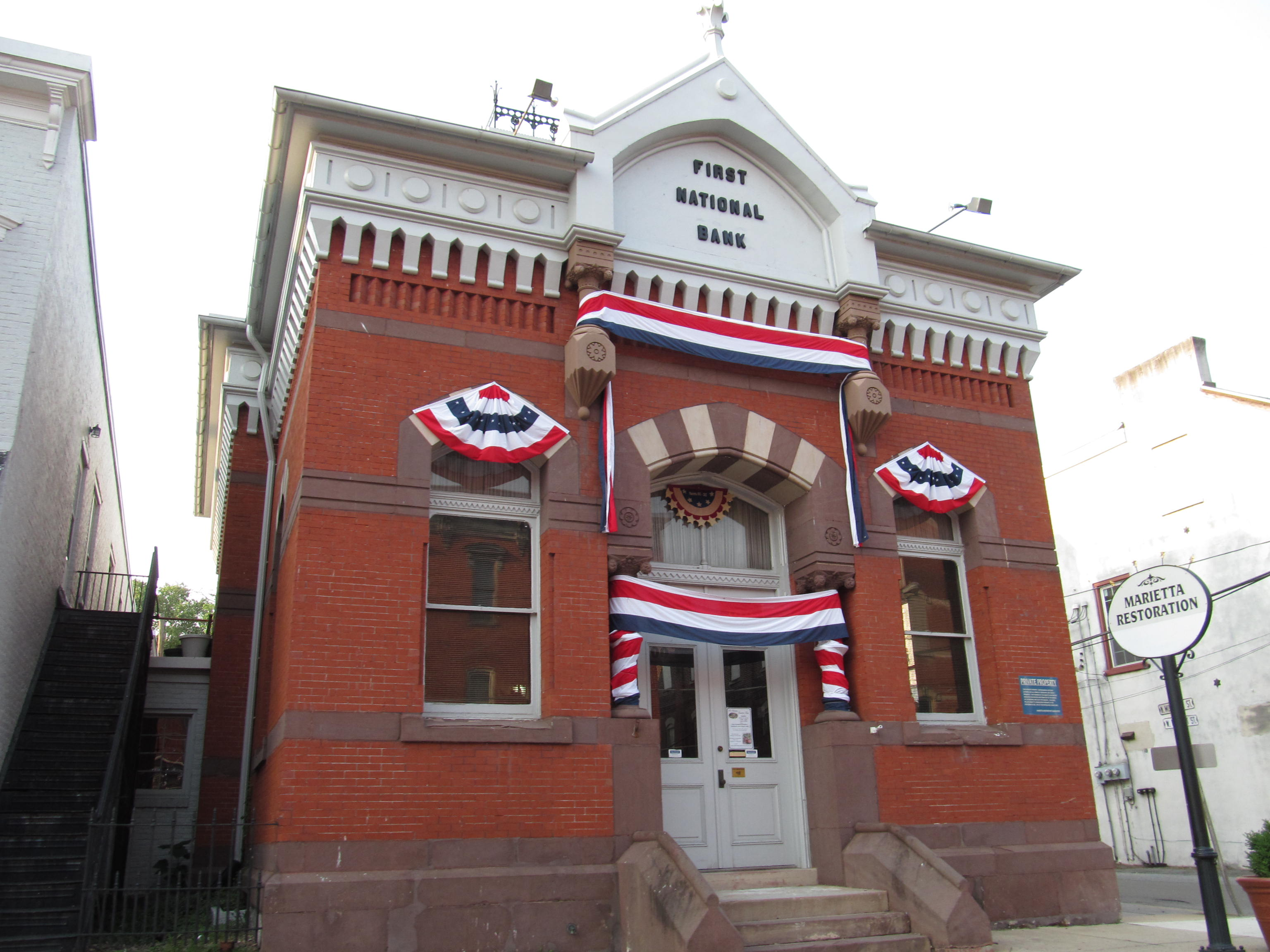
First National Bank Building

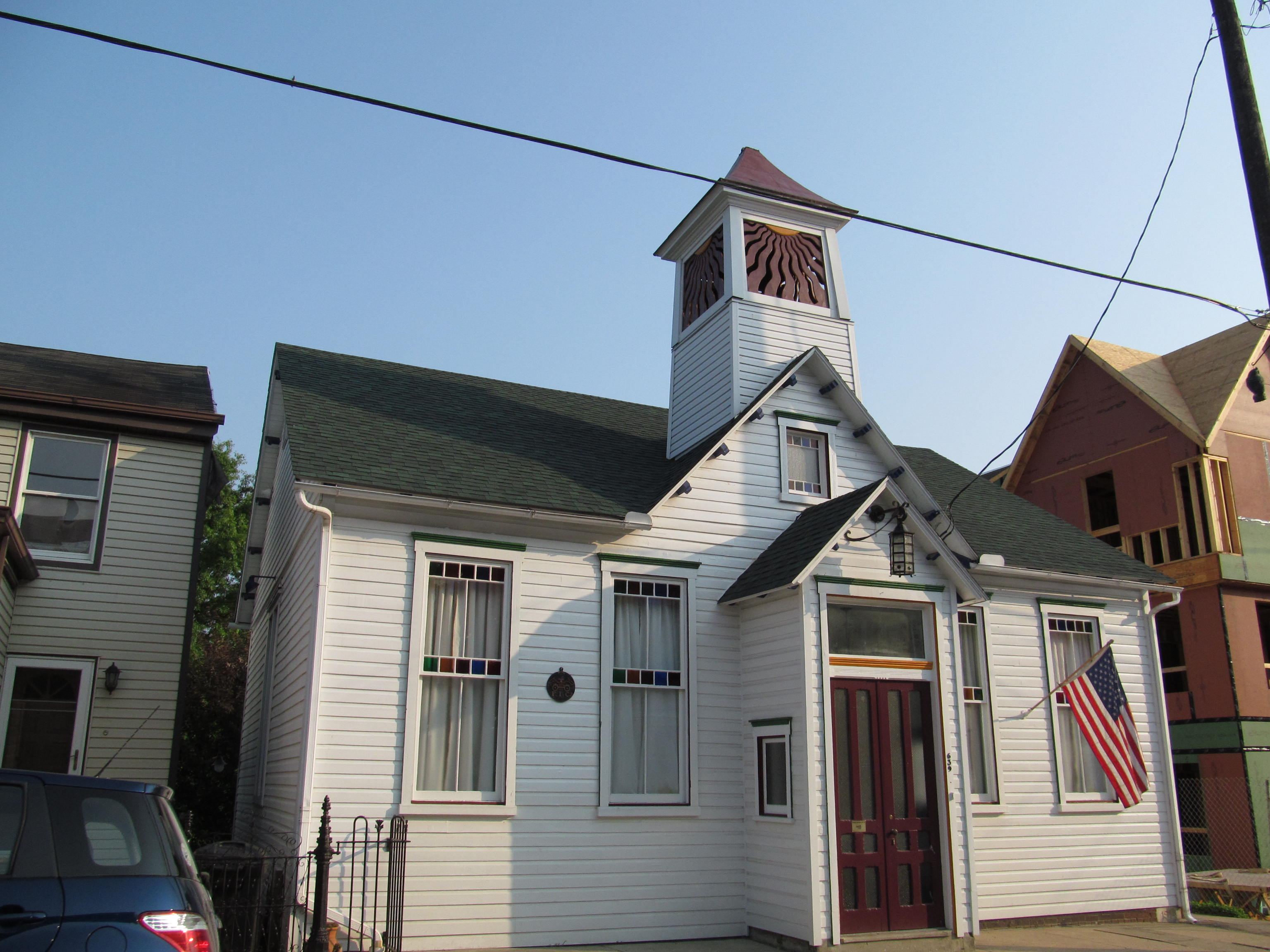
