= Pennsylvania Route 724 =

State highway in Pennsylvania, US

Pennsylvania Route 724

Route information
- Maintained by PennDOT
- Length: 30.553 mi (49.170 km)

Major junctions
- West end: US 422 in Sinking Spring
- US 222 in Spring Township; US 222 Bus. in Shillington; PA 625 in Kenhorst; PA 10 in Cumru Township; I-176 in Cumru Township; PA 568 in Robeson Township; PA 345 in Birdsboro; PA 100 in North Coventry Township; US 422 in North Coventry Township
- East end: PA 23 in East Pikeland Township

Location
- Country: United States
- State: Pennsylvania
- Counties: Berks, Chester

Highway system
- Pennsylvania State Route System; Interstate; US; State; Scenic; Legislative
← PA 722	→ PA 729

Pennsylvania Route 724 (PA 724) is a 30-mile (48 km) road in the U.S. commonwealth of Pennsylvania that runs from U.S. Route 422 (US 422) in Sinking Spring southeast to PA 23 near Phoenixville. PA 724 travels through Berks and Chester counties. The route runs through the southern suburbs of Reading, passing through Shillington and Kenhorst. Past the Reading area, PA 724 continues southeast parallel to the Schuylkill River, passing through or near Birdsboro, Pottstown, and Spring City. The route intersects many roads including US 222 near Shillington, PA 10 and Interstate 176 (I-176) southeast of Reading, PA 345 in Birdsboro, and PA 100 and US 422 near Pottstown.

The portion of PA 724 between Poplar Neck Road southeast of Reading and PA 23 was designated as part of PA 83 in 1927. By 1966, PA 724 was assigned to its current alignment and replaced the portion of PA 183 (which replaced PA 83 in 1961) between the Reading area and Phoenixville. PA 724 was referenced in Hall & Oates' 1973 album Abandoned Luncheonette, with the defunct Rosedale Diner that was located along the route near Pottstown on the album cover.

== Route description ==
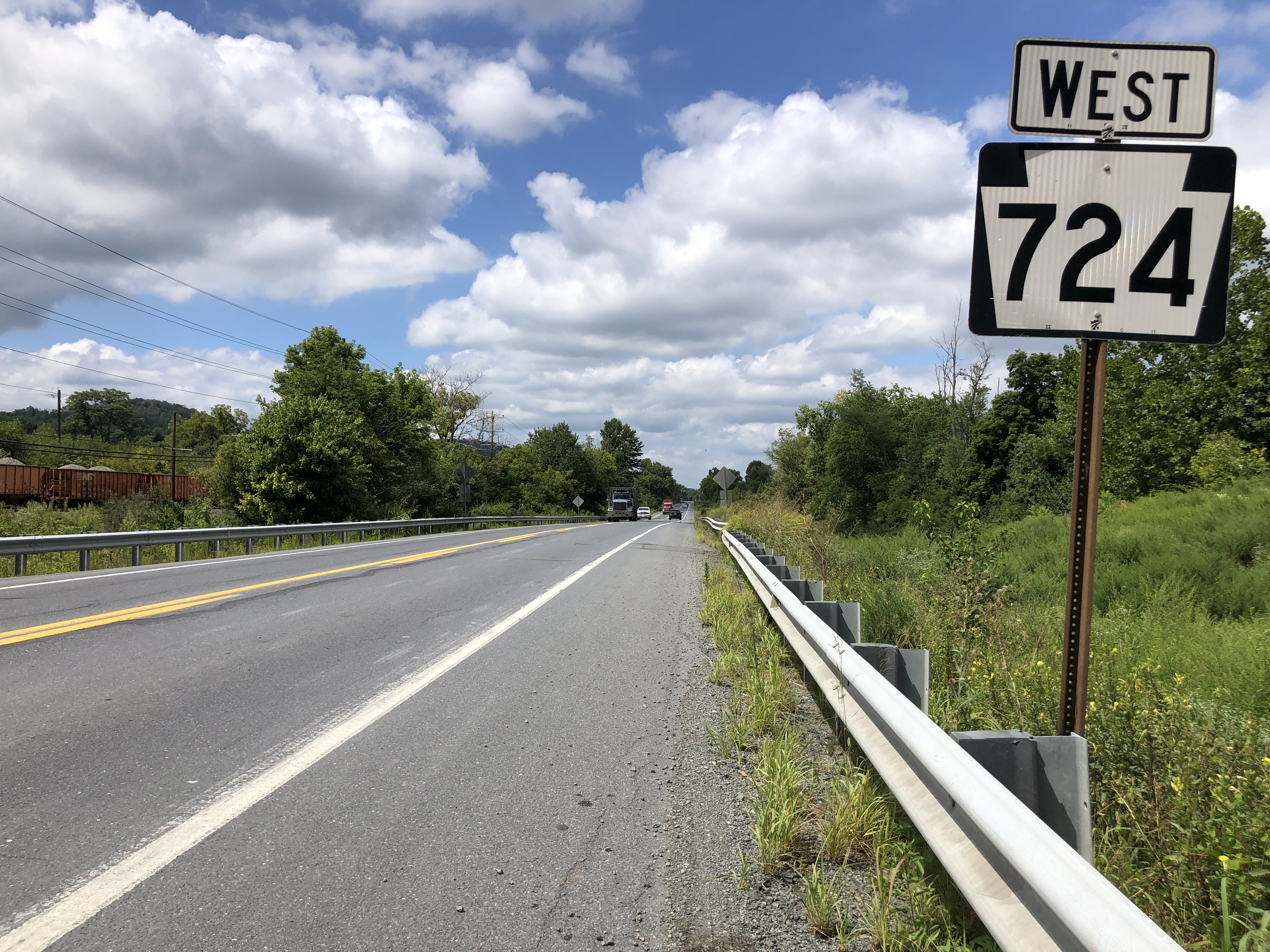
PA 724 westbound in Robeson Township

PA 724 begins at an intersection with US 422 near the city of Reading in the borough of Sinking Spring, Berks County, heading southeast on two-lane undivided Shillington Road. The road passes businesses and crosses under Norfolk Southern's Harrisburg Line. The route gains a center left-turn lane and crosses into Spring Township, where it heads through residential areas with some commercial establishments. PA 724 becomes a divided highway as it reaches an interchange with the US 222 freeway. Past this, the route becomes a two-lane undivided road and passes through business areas, with the name changing to Revere Boulevard. The road passes near some homes as it enters Cumru Township before forming the border between the borough of Wyomissing to the north and Cumru Township to the south. PA 724 widens into a four-lane divided highway and runs past businesses, turning south into Cumru Township to intersect US 222 Bus. At this point, PA 724 turns east to form a concurrency with US 222 Bus. on Lancaster Avenue, a five-lane road with a center left-turn lane. The road briefly runs along the Wyomissing/Cumru Township border before it crosses Wyomissing Creek and enters the borough of Shillington, where it narrows to a two-lane undivided road past homes and some businesses that runs east-southeast. US 222 Bus. splits to the northeast along Lancaster Avenue while PA 724 continues east-southeast along Philadelphia Avenue past more residences. The road continues east into Cumru Township before it forms the border between the borough of Kenhorst to the north and Cumru Township to the south as it reaches an intersection with PA 625 in commercial areas. Past this, the route crosses Angelica Creek and fully enters Cumru Township again, passing through the residential community of Grill. PA 724 continues past homes and some rural land before it intersects PA 10, where it heads north for a brief concurrency with that route on Morgantown Road.

Upon splitting from PA 10, PA 724 winds east along Philadelphia Avenue through forested areas, running along the south bank of the Schuylkill River. The route comes to an interchange with I-176 and passes southeast through the community of Ridgewood, where it crosses the Schuylkill River Trail and Norfolk Southern's Harrisburg Line #1. The road heads east into Robeson Township and turns southeast through wooded areas with some development as Main Street, passing through the community of Seyfert before crossing Allegheny Creek and reaching an intersection with the eastern terminus of PA 568 in the community of Gibraltar. The road heads east-southeast through a mix of fields and trees with some homes along the north side of the Norfolk Southern line and a short distance south of the Schuylkill River. Farther east, PA 724 passes through wooded areas before it enters the borough of Birdsboro, where it runs past residences and industrial development on West Main Street. The road passes under the Norfolk Southern tracks before it comes to a junction with PA 345. At this point, PA 724 turns south for a concurrency with PA 345 on North Furnace Street through the commercial center of Birdsboro. The two routes turn east onto East Main Street and cross Hay Creek, passing through residential areas. At the eastern border of Birdsboro, PA 345 splits to the south and PA 724 continues east into Union Township, passing through rural areas of homes and the communities of Mount Airy and Monocacy. In this area, the road crosses the Schuylkill River Trail at-grade and passes under the trail further east. The route runs east through a mix of farmland and woodland with some homes before it turns southeast and follows the Schuylkill River. The road name changes to Schuylkill Road as it continues alongside the river.

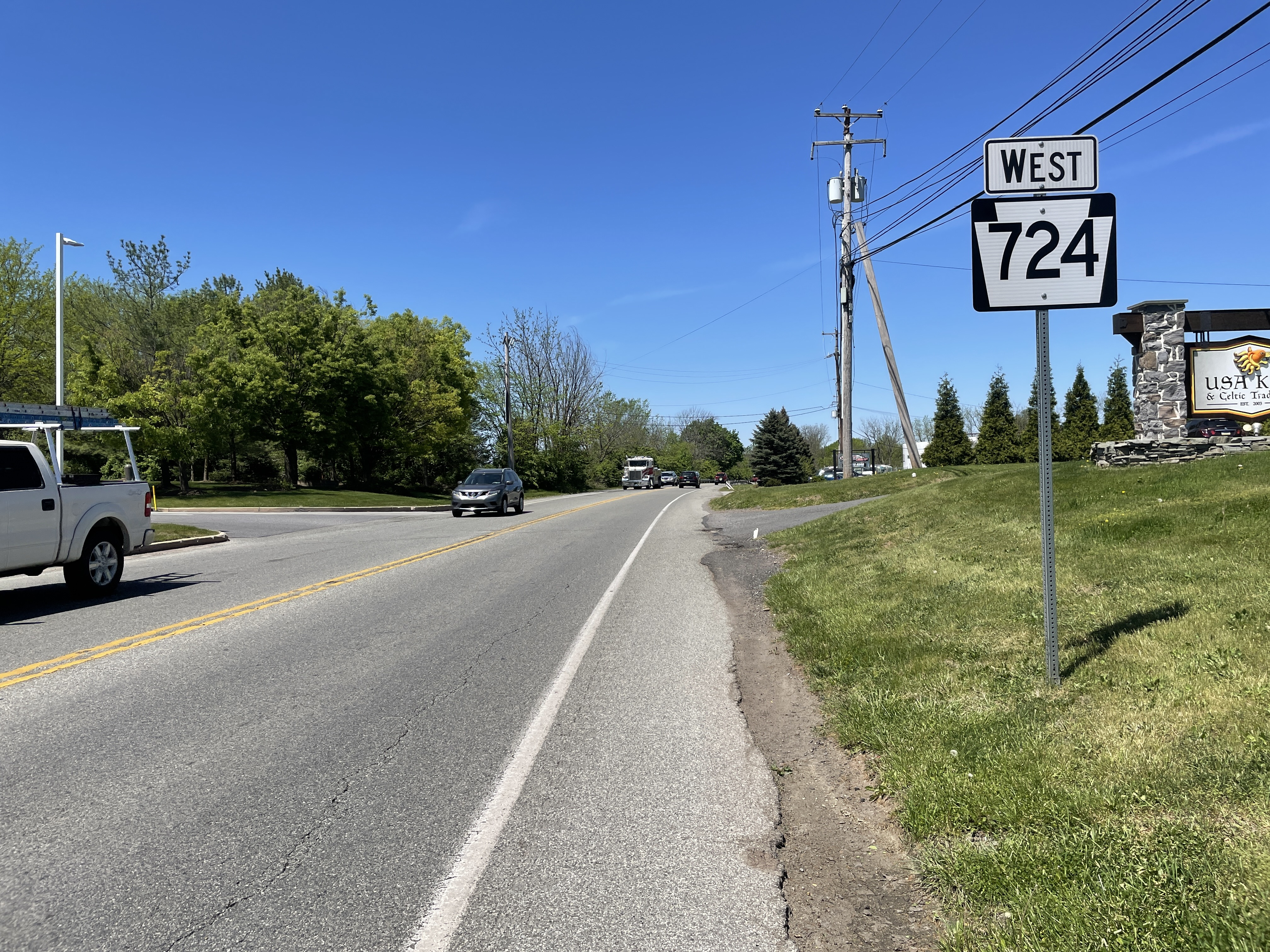
PA 724 westbound in East Vincent Township

PA 724 enters North Coventry Township in Chester County and continues southeast through forested areas along the Schuylkill River before heading east into farmland further south from the river. The route becomes a three-lane road with two westbound lanes and one eastbound lane as it heads through commercial areas, with The Shoppes at Coventry located on the north side of the road. PA 724 becomes a four-lane divided highway as it reaches an interchange with PA 100. Past this interchange, the route narrows to a two-lane undivided road and passes through the residential community of South Pottstown and intersects Hanover Street, which heads north toward the borough of Pottstown. The road passes through a golf course and runs through the community of Kenilworth, where it intersects a ramp that provides access to the US 422 freeway to the north at a trumpet interchange. After this, PA 724 curves to the southeast and crosses into East Coventry Township and runs through a mix of farmland and woodland with some homes. The route passes through the community of Parker Ford, where it intersects Linfield Road/Bethel Church Road, and briefly runs to the southwest of the Schuylkill River Trail before it enters East Vincent Township. The road passes through a golf course before heading into a commercial area and intersecting Bridge Street, which heads east toward the borough of Spring City. PA 724 continues past a mix of residences, businesses, and farm fields, turning to the south and coming to a junction with New Street, which also provides access to Spring City. The route continues into East Pikeland Township and continues south to its eastern terminus at an intersection with PA 23. At this point, PA 23 continues southeast along Schuylkill Road toward the borough of Phoenixville.

== History ==
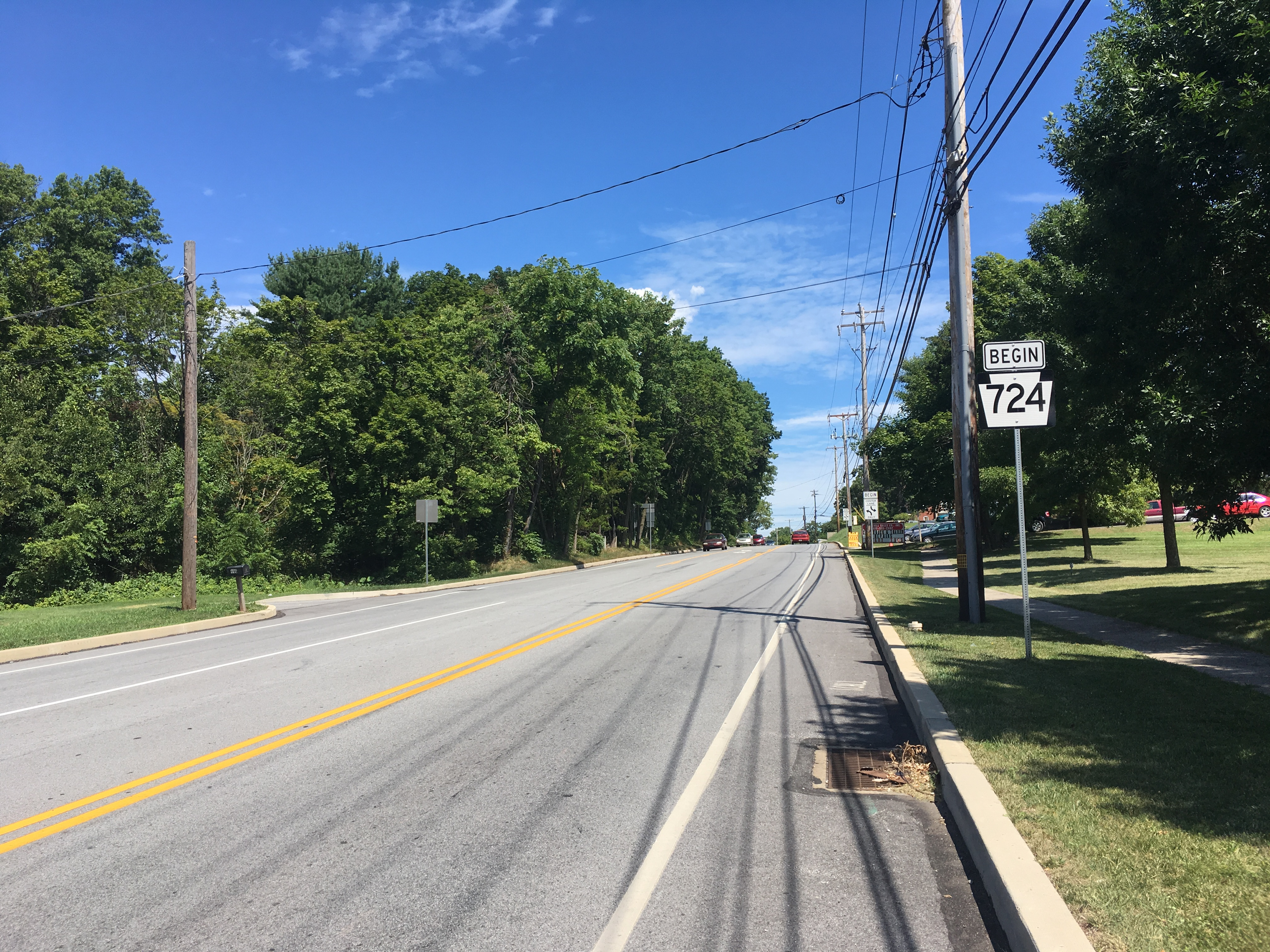
PA 724 westbound past its eastern terminus at PA 23 in East Pikeland Township

When routes were first legislated in Pennsylvania in 1911, what is now PA 724 was designated as part of Legislative Route 147 between east of Reading and North Coventry Township and as part of Legislative Route 201 between North Coventry Township and Phoenixville. In 1927, PA 83 was designated along the road between Poplar Neck Road and PA 23 while the road west of there remained unnumbered. By 1940, the current alignment of PA 724 between Sinking Spring and PA 83 existed as an unnumbered paved road. By 1950, PA 83 was shifted to a new alignment between Kenilworth and Parker Ford, with the former alignment now Old Schuylkill Road. In 1961, PA 83 was renumbered to PA 183 to avoid conflict with I-83 in South Central Pennsylvania. PA 724 was designated onto its current alignment between US 422 in Sinking Spring and PA 23 near Phoenixville by 1966, replacing the portion of PA 183 between Poplar Neck Road and PA 23.

PA 724 is referenced in the liner notes of Hall & Oates' 1973 album Abandoned Luncheonette. Daryl Hall, a Pottstown native, and John Oates approached Talmadge W. Faulk at his restaurant Toggs on PA 724 on the eastern outskirts of town. The duo requested permission to photograph Faulk's defunct Rosedale Diner, which had been sitting dormant across the street since 1965. The photograph became the cover image for Abandoned Luncheonette. In the liner notes, Faulk is simply credited as "The man on Rt. 724". In exchange for his verbal permission, Faulk received an autographed copy of the first album off the presses. The Rosedale Diner remained in the same spot until it was scrapped in 1983, due to the dilapidated condition it had incurred at the hands of souvenir-hunting Hall & Oates fans. Faulk died in 2007.

== Major intersections ==
County	Location	mi	km	Destinations	Notes
Berks	Sinking Spring	0.000	0.000	US 422 – Wernersville, Lebanon, Reading	Western terminus
Berks	Spring Township	1.297	2.087	US 222 – Reading, Allentown, Lancaster	Interchange
Berks	Cumru Township	2.377	3.825	US 222 Bus. south to US 222 south – Lancaster	West end of US 222 Bus. concurrency
Berks	Shillington	3.033	4.881	US 222 Bus. north – Reading	East end of US 222 Bus. concurrency
Berks	Kenhorst	4.308	6.933	PA 625 – Reading, Knauers	
Berks	Cumru Township	5.422	8.726	PA 10 south (Morgantown Road) – Green Hills, Morgantown	West end of PA 10 concurrency
Berks	Cumru Township	5.504	8.858	PA 10 north (Morgantown Road) – Reading	East end of PA 10 concurrency
Berks	Cumru Township	7.076	11.388	I-176 – Reading, Morgantown	Exit 10 on I-176
Berks	Robeson Township	8.900	14.323	PA 568 west (Green Hills Road) – Green Hills	Eastern terminus of PA 568
Berks	Birdsboro	12.573	20.234	PA 345 north (Furnace Street) – Pottstown, Baumstown, Reading	West end of PA 345 concurrency
Berks	Birdsboro	13.224	21.282	PA 345 south (Chestnut Street) – Geigertown, Coatesville	East end of PA 345 concurrency
Chester	North Coventry Township	21.238	34.179	PA 100 – Pottstown, Boyertown	Interchange
Chester	North Coventry Township	22.964	36.957	US 422 – Pottstown, Reading, King of Prussia	Interchange
Chester	East Pikeland Township	30.553	49.170	PA 23 west (Ridge Road)	
Chester	East Pikeland Township	30.553	49.170	PA 23 east (Schuylkill Road) – Phoenixville	Continuation east
1.000 mi = 1.609 km; 1.000 km = 0.621 mi: Concurrency terminus

== PA 724 Truck ==
Pennsylvania Route 724 Truck
- Location: Berks County
- Existed: 2013–2017

Pennsylvania Route 724 Truck was a truck route of PA 724 around a weight-restricted bridge over the Angelica Creek in Kenhorst, on which trucks over 20 tons and combination loads over 29 tons are prohibited. The route followed PA 625, US 222 Bus., US 422, and I-176. It was signed in 2013, but as of October 2017, signs have been removed.
