= Pennsylvania Route 568 =

State highway in Pennsylvania, US

Pennsylvania Route 568

Route information
- Maintained by PennDOT
- Length: 11.603 mi (18.673 km)

Major junctions
- West end: US 222 / PA 272 near Adamstown
- PA 625 in Brecknock Township; PA 10 in Robeson Township
- East end: PA 724 in Robeson Township

Location
- Country: United States
- State: Pennsylvania
- Counties: Berks

Highway system
- Pennsylvania State Route System; Interstate; US; State; Scenic; Legislative
← PA 566	→ PA 570

Pennsylvania Route 568 (PA 568) is an 11.60-mile-long (18.67 km) state route in Berks County in east central Pennsylvania, United States. The western terminus is at U.S. Route 222 (US 222) near Adamstown, where PA 568 continues to the southwest as PA 272. The eastern terminus is at PA 724 in the Robeson Township hamlet of Gibraltar. The route is a two-lane undivided road that passes through rural areas in southern Berks County. The route intersects PA 625 in Knauers, passes through Alleghenyville, and forms a brief concurrency with PA 10 in Green Hills. PA 568 was designated onto its current alignment by 1966. The intersection with US 222 and PA 272 at the western terminus was replaced with an interchange in 2006.

== Route description ==
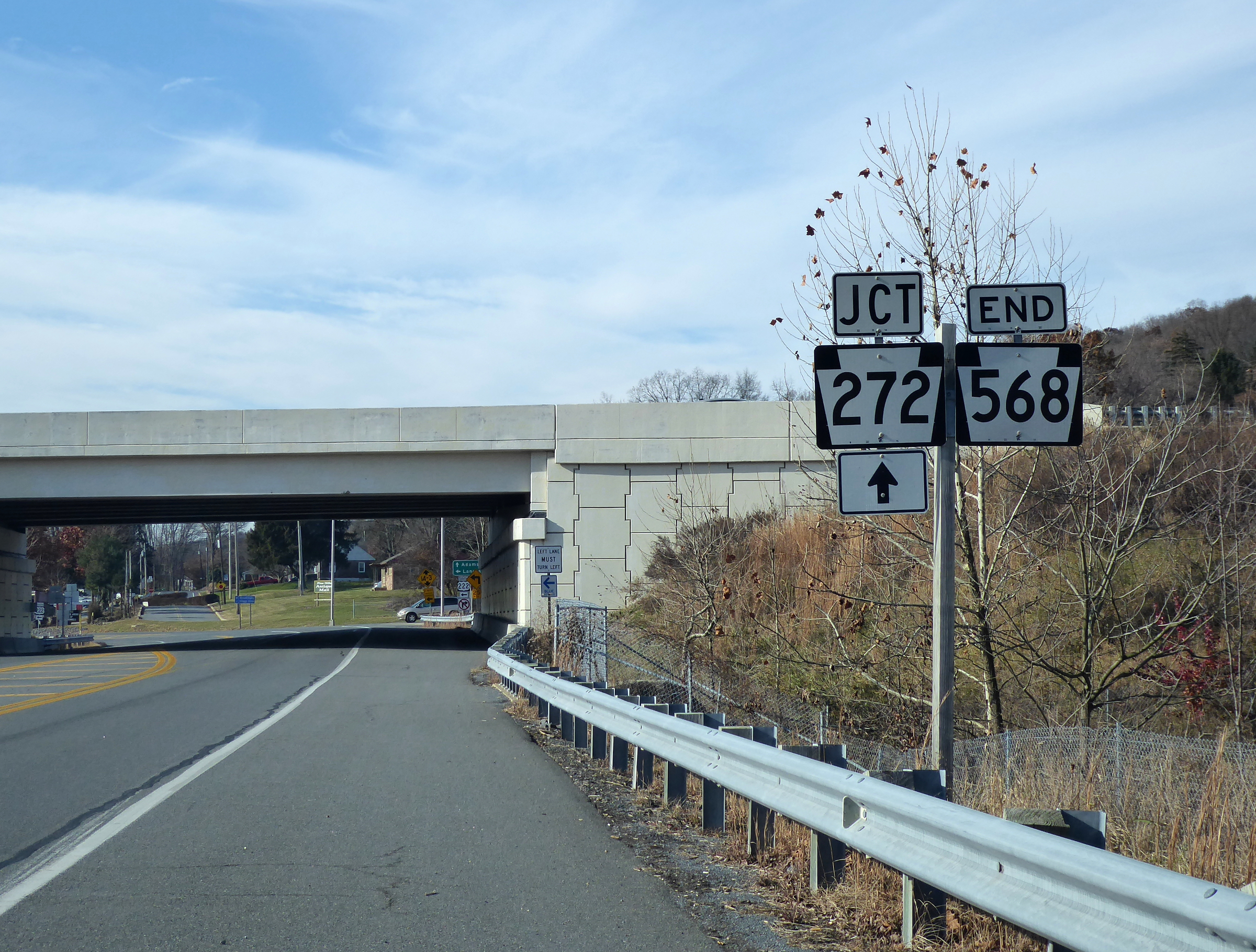
PA 568 western terminus at US 222/PA 272 in Brecknock Township.

PA 568 begins at a partial cloverleaf interchange with the US 222 freeway and the northern terminus of PA 272 northeast of the borough of Adamstown in Brecknock Township, Berks County. From this interchange, the route heads east as two-lane undivided Alleghenyville Road, passing through forested areas with some fields and homes. The road continues through rural land and comes to an intersection with PA 625 in the community of Knauers. PA 568 heads southeast through forests with residential subdivisions, reaching the community of Alleghenyville. At this point, the route turns northeast as Kurtz Mill Road and crosses Allegheny Creek, curving east into a mix of farmland, woods, and homes. The road heads northeast into Robeson Township and runs through more rural areas, passing under Interstate 176 without an interchange before coming to the PA 10 junction near Green Hills. At this intersection, PA 568 turns south to briefly run concurrent with PA 10 on Morgantown Road before it splits to the east on Green Hills Road. The road winds to the northeast through forests with some homes and fields. The route follows Allegheny Creek and winds east and then north through more forested areas. PA 568 heads northeast into the residential community of Gibraltar and passes underneath the Schuylkill River Trail and a Norfolk Southern railroad line before it reaches its eastern terminus at PA 724.

== History ==
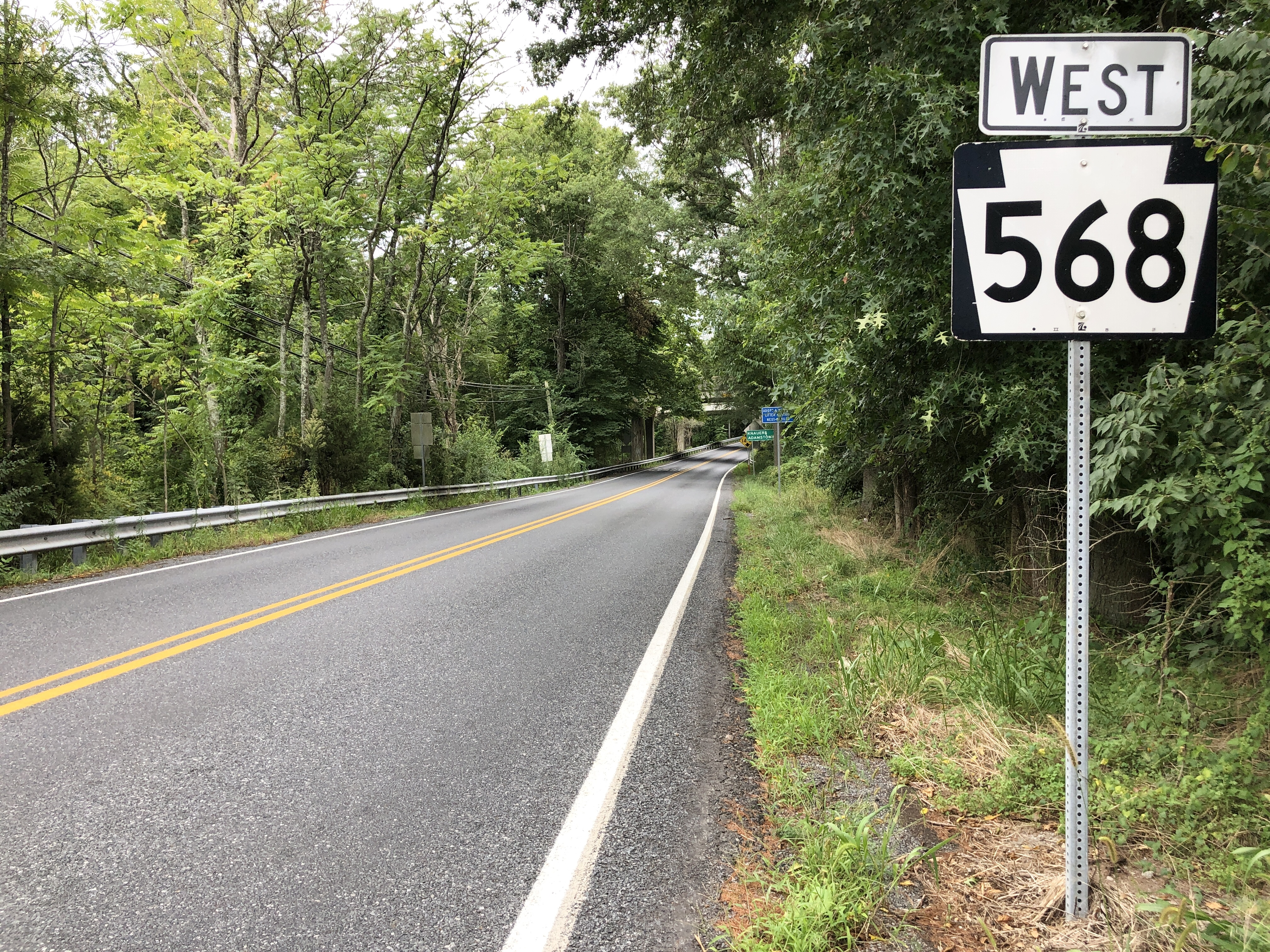
PA 568 westbound past PA 10 in Robeson Township

The present-day alignment of PA 568 was not legislated as part of a route when Pennsylvania first legislated routes in 1911. By 1928, the alignment between Adamstown and Alleghenyville existed as an unpaved road. The roadway between Adamstown and Alleghenyville was paved by 1940. By 1953, the road between Alleghenyville and Gibraltar was paved. PA 568 was designated by 1966 to run from US 222 near Adamstown east to PA 724 in Gibraltar. In 2006, the intersection with US 222 and PA 272 at the western terminus was replaced with an interchange as part of upgrading US 222 to a freeway.

== Major intersections ==
The entire route is in Berks County.

Location	mi	km	Destinations	Notes
Brecknock Township	0.000	0.000	PA 272 south (North Reading Road) – Adamstown	Continuation south
Brecknock Township	0.000	0.000	US 222 – Lancaster, Reading	Interchange
Brecknock Township	2.161	3.478	PA 625 (New Holland Road) – Reading, Blue Ball	
Robeson Township	7.611	12.249	PA 10 north (Morgantown Road) to I-176 – Green Hills	Western end of PA 10 concurrency
Robeson Township	7.687	12.371	PA 10 south (Morgantown Road) – Beckersville	Eastern end of PA 10 concurrency
Robeson Township	11.603	18.673	PA 724 (Main Street) – Shillington, Birdsboro	Eastern terminus
1.000 mi = 1.609 km; 1.000 km = 0.621 mi: Concurrency terminus
