= Pennsylvania Route 10 =

State highway in Pennsylvania, US

Pennsylvania Route 10

Route information
- Maintained by PennDOT
- Length: 44.041 mi (70.877 km)
- Existed: 1956–present

Major junctions
- South end: PA 472 in Oxford
- US 1 near Oxford; PA 896 in Russellville; PA 41 in Cochranville; PA 372 in Parkesburg; US 30 near Parkesburg; PA 340 in Compass; US 322 in Honey Brook; PA 23 in Morgantown; I-76 Toll / Penna Turnpike / I-176 in Morgantown; I-176 in Robeson Township
- North end: US 222 Bus. in Reading

Location
- Country: United States
- State: Pennsylvania
- Counties: Chester, Lancaster, Berks

Highway system
- Pennsylvania State Route System; Interstate; US; State; Scenic; Legislative
← PA 9	→ US 11

Pennsylvania Route 10 (PA 10) is a 44.04-mile-long (70.88 km) state route in southeastern Pennsylvania. Its southern terminus is at PA 472 in Oxford. Its northern terminus is at U.S. Route 222 Business (US 222 Bus.) in Reading. PA 10 is mostly a two-lane undivided road that serves Chester, Lancaster, and Berks counties. The route begins in Oxford and passes through rural areas of western Chester County, serving Cochranville, Parkesburg, Compass, and Honey Brook. The route passes through a small corner of eastern Lancaster County before it enters Berks County and reaches Morgantown, where it has interchanges with Interstate 176 (I-176). Between Morgantown and Reading, PA 10 parallels I-176.

The road between Oxford and Reading was originally designated as Legislative Route 274 in 1911. In 1927, this road became a portion of PA 42, which continued north from Reading to northern Pennsylvania. The PA 42 designation was replaced with US 122 in 1935; US 122 ran between Oxford and Reading and continued north to Northumberland. In the 1950s, PA 10 replaced the US 122 designation between US 1/PA 472 in Oxford and PA 23 in Morgantown. US 122 was decommissioned in 1963 and PA 10 was extended north along the former alignment between Morgantown and US 222 (now US 222 Bus.) in Reading.

== Route description ==
=== Chester County ===
PA 10 begins at an intersection with PA 472 in the center of the borough of Oxford in Chester County. The route heads north on two-lane undivided North Third Street, running concurrent with PA 472 for one block before that route splits to the northwest. PA 10 continues north through residential areas before heading into areas of businesses as it becomes the border between Lower Oxford Township to the west and Oxford to the east. In this area, the road briefly gains a center left-turn lane and a second southbound lane before narrowing back to two lanes. The route fully enters Lower Oxford Township and becomes Limestone Road, passing northeast through a mix of farms and homes before reaching a partial cloverleaf interchange with the US 1 freeway. Past this, the road curves to the north and passes to the east of Wyncote Golf Club. PA 10 runs northeast through agricultural areas with some trees and homes and crosses into Upper Oxford Township. The route comes to an intersection with PA 896 in the residential community of Russellville.

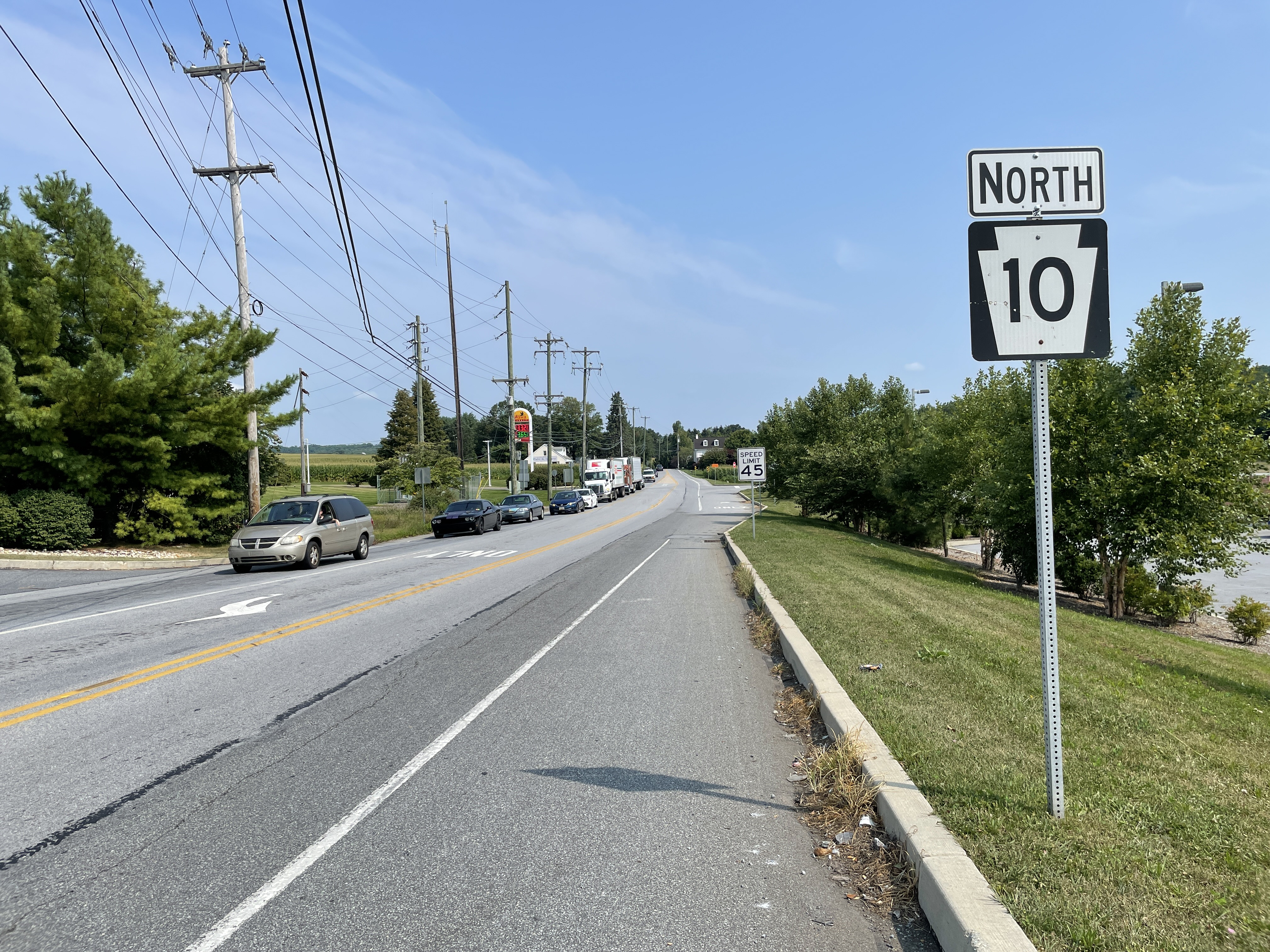
PA 10 northbound past US 30 in Sadsbury Township

A short distance later, the road reaches a junction with the western terminus of PA 926. PA 10 continues north-northeast through rural areas and enters West Fallowfield Township. The route runs north through more farmland before it reaches the community of Cochranville, where it turns northeast past homes and businesses and intersects PA 41. Following this intersection, the road heads back into agricultural areas and crosses into Highland Township, curving to the north. PA 10 winds north through farmland with some woods and residences. The road passes through wooded areas of hills before it enters the borough of Parkesburg.

Upon entering Parkesburg, the route becomes South Church Street and runs between residential areas to the west and farm fields to the east before intersecting PA 372 in a commercial area. At this point, the road becomes North Church Street and passes under Amtrak's Keystone Corridor railroad line before it runs through woodland with some residential development. PA 10 leaves Parkesburg for Sadsbury Township and becomes Octorara Trail, running northwest through farmland with some homes. The route turns north along the border between West Sadsbury Township to the west and Sadsbury Township to the east as it intersects US 30 (Lincoln Highway) in a business area, briefly gaining a center left-turn lane past the US 30 intersection. The road continues north along the township line through farmland with some residences, crossing Buck Run, before heading into forested areas and entering West Caln Township. PA 10 winds northeast and then northwest through hilly land before passing some fields and intersecting PA 340 in the community of Compass.

Here, PA 10 briefly runs concurrent with PA 340 on West Kings Highway past homes before splitting northeast along Compass Road. The route runs through a mix of farm fields and woods with some homes, curving to the north. The road enters Honey Brook Township and heads into agricultural areas with some trees and residences containing several Amish farms. PA 10 crosses into the borough of Honey Brook and heads northeast on Pequea Avenue past homes, intersecting US 322 in the commercial center of the borough. Past this intersection, the route becomes Conestoga Avenue and passes more homes before heading back into Honey Brook Township on Twin County Road. PA 10 runs north-northwest through farmland with some homes, crossing the West Branch Brandywine Creek before heading northeast and ascending a small forested hill named Welsh Mountain.

=== Lancaster and Berks counties ===
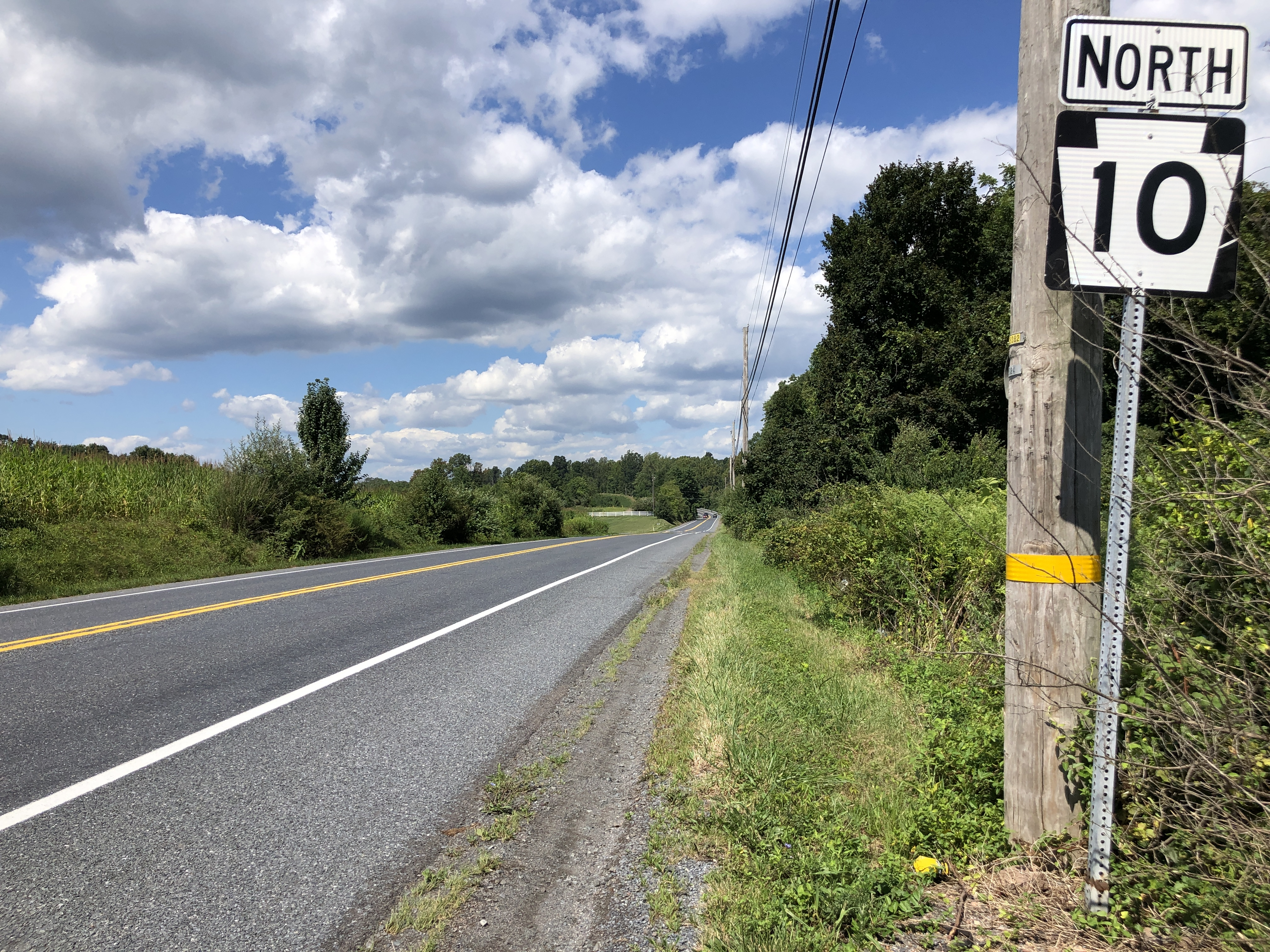
PA 10 northbound in New Morgan

PA 10 enters Caernarvon Township in Lancaster County and descends the hill into farmland, continuing to the north and crossing the Conestoga River. The route reaches an intersection with PA 23, at which point it turns northeast for a concurrency with that route along Main Street, a three-lane road with a center left-turn lane that heads into commercial areas. The road crosses into Caernarvon Township in Berks County and intersects SR 2089, a four-lane freeway that provides access to northbound I-176. The two routes continue into the community of Morgantown as a two-lane road and pass homes. PA 10 splits from PA 23 by turning north onto Morgantown Road, passing to the east of the Morgantown Center event facility before coming to a bridge over the Pennsylvania Turnpike (I-76). The route turns east, passing to the north of Hollywood Casino Morgantown, and comes to a partial cloverleaf interchange with I-176 that provides access to the Pennsylvania Turnpike (I-76) at the Morgantown interchange to the south.

Following this, the route becomes the border between the borough of New Morgan to the north and Caernarvon Township to the south before it turns north and fully enters New Morgan, heading through forested areas with some development. The road skirts between New Morgan and Caernarvon Township multiple times, running through a mix of fields and woods, before it turns northwest and follows the border between New Morgan to the southwest and Robeson Township to the northeast through forests. PA 10 fully enters Robeson Township and runs through wooded areas with some development prior to turning north and passing farm fields as it reaches the community of Plowville. The route continues north through forested areas with some development a short distance to the east of I-176 and passes through Beckersville before it forms a short concurrency with PA 568 near Green Hills Lake, crossing Allegheny Creek.

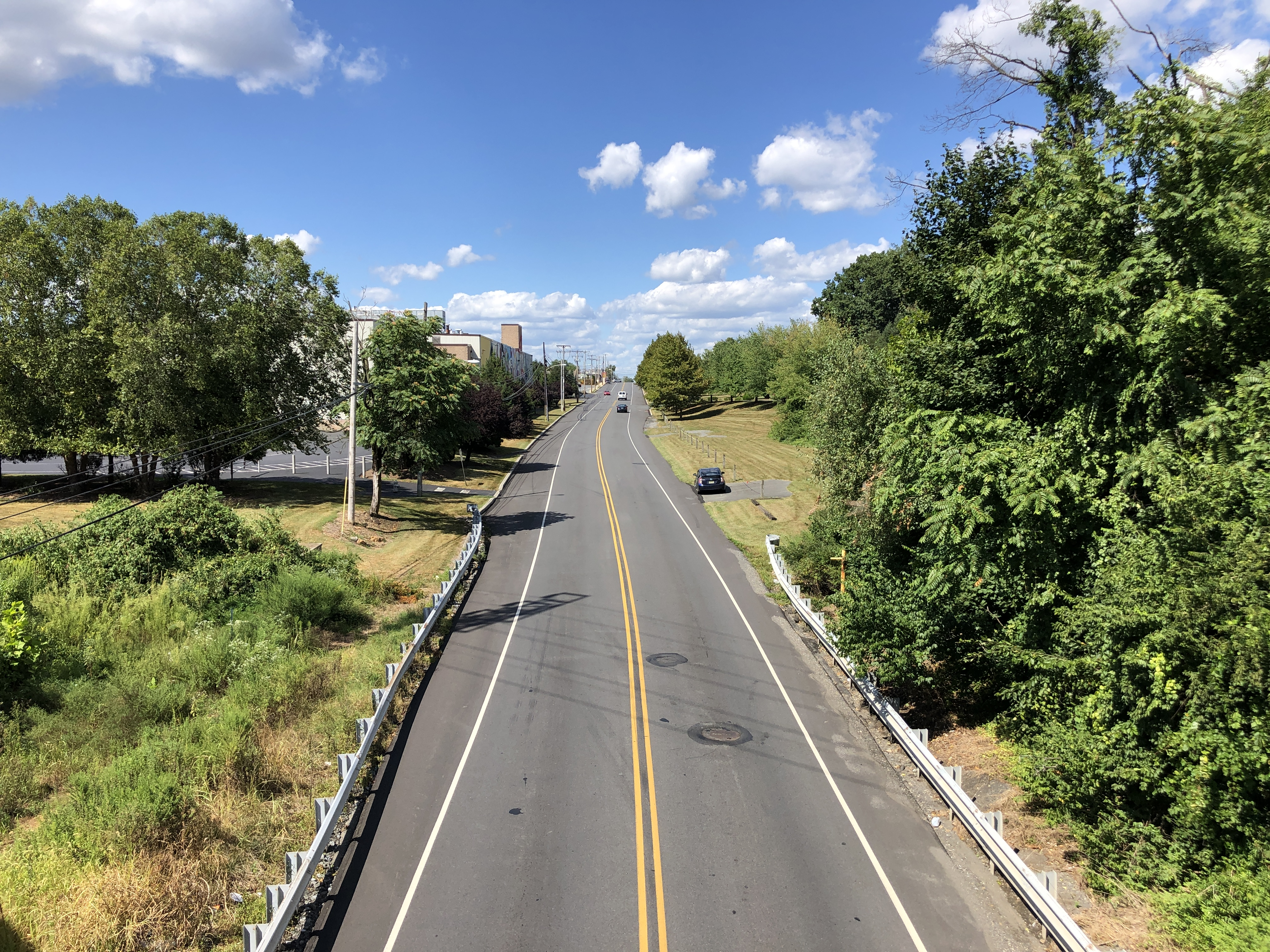
PA 10 northbound entering Reading

Following PA 568, PA 10 comes to ramps providing access to and from the northbound lanes of I-176 in the community of Green Hills before it turns west and passes under the interstate. The route curves north again and passes near commercial development as it enters Cumru Township and comes to ramps providing access to and from the southbound direction of I-176. The road passes through wooded areas with some homes and runs to the west of the Flying Hills Golf Course. Farther north, PA 10 comes to an intersection with PA 724, where that route turns north for a short concurrency before splitting to the east. The route continues north through woodland with some homes and commercial development to the west of the Schuylkill River before it enters the city of Reading. The road crosses Angelica Creek and passes under Norfolk Southern's Harrisburg Line #1 railroad line, running to the east of industry. PA 10 heads into a mix of residential and commercial areas and turns to the northwest. The route continues west between neighborhoods and businesses to the south and the Schuylkill River Trail and the US 422 freeway to the north before it comes to its northern terminus at an intersection with US 222 Bus. a short distance south of an interchange with US 422. At this intersection, left turns are prohibited from PA 10 northbound to US 222 Bus. southbound.

== History ==
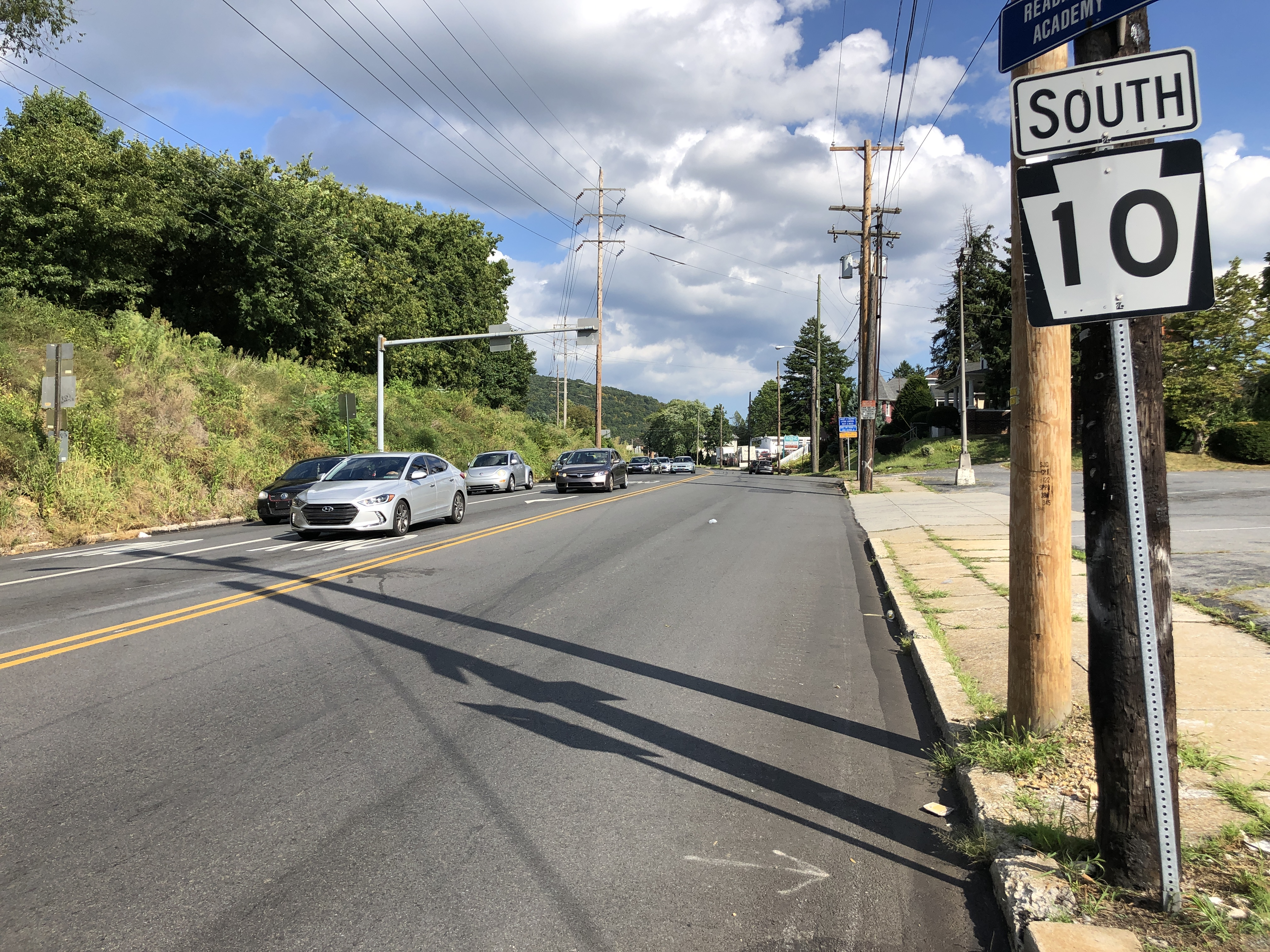
PA 10 southbound past northern terminus at US 222 Bus. in Reading

The portion of present-day PA 10 along Limestone Road was originally a Native American trail. When routes were first legislated in Pennsylvania in 1911, today's PA 10 was designated as Legislative Route 274, running between Legislative Route 131 in Oxford and Legislative Route 148 in Reading. By 1926, the entire length of Legislative Route 274 was paved except between Compass and south of Honey Brook and Honey Brook and Morgantown. In 1927, the road between US 1/PA 12 (now PA 472) in Oxford and US 222/PA 41 (now US 222 Bus.) in Reading was designated as part of PA 42, which continued north from Reading to the New York border in South Waverly. By 1928, the entire length of PA 42 between Oxford and Reading was paved. In April 1935, US 122 replaced the PA 42 designation between Oxford and Reading. US 122 began at US 1/PA 472 in the center of Oxford and continued north to Reading, where it ran north along the present-day PA 61 alignment to Sunbury and present-day PA 147 to US 11/US 111 in Northumberland. In 1955, the southern terminus of US 122 was cut back to Morgantown, and PA 10 was designated along the former alignment of US 122 between US 1/PA 472 in Oxford and PA 23 in Morgantown. The route was realigned to a new alignment south of the US 30 intersection north of Parkesburg in the 1950s, having previously followed current Hershey Lane and a concurrency with US 30. US 122 was decommissioned in 1963, and PA 10 was extended north along the former alignment to US 222 (now US 222 Bus.) in Reading. I-176 was built parallel to PA 10 between Morgantown and Reading in the 1960s.

== Major intersections ==
County	Location	mi	km	Destinations	Notes
Chester	Oxford	0.000	0.000	PA 472 south (Market Street) – Lewisville	Continuation south; southern end of PA 472 concurrency
Chester	Oxford	0.022	0.035	PA 472 north (Lancaster Avenue) – Quarryville	Northern end of PA 472 concurrency
Chester	Lower Oxford Township	1.690	2.720	US 1 – Rising Sun, Kennett Square	Interchange
Chester	Upper Oxford Township	4.638	7.464	PA 896 (Newark Road) – Octoraro, New London	
Chester	Upper Oxford Township	5.131	8.258	PA 926 east (Street Road) – London Grove	Western terminus of PA 926
Chester	West Fallowfield Township	8.489	13.662	PA 41 (Gap–Newport Pike) – Atglen, Avondale	
Chester	Parkesburg	13.581	21.857	PA 372 (First Avenue) – Parkesburg, Coatesville	
Chester	West Sadsbury–Sadsbury township line	15.650	25.186	US 30 (Lincoln Highway) – Lancaster, Coatesville	
Chester	West Caln Township	18.613	29.955	PA 340 east – Wagontown	Southern end of PA 340 concurrency
Chester	West Caln Township	18.761	30.193	PA 340 west – Lancaster	Northern end of PA 340 concurrency
Chester	Honey Brook	24.585	39.566	US 322 (Horseshoe Pike) – Beartown, Downingtown	
Lancaster	Caernarvon Township	29.083	46.805	PA 23 west – Lancaster	Southern end of PA 23 concurrency
Berks	Caernarvon Township	29.283	47.126	I-176 north – Green Hills, Reading	Access to I-176 north and from I-176 south; access via SR 2089; exit 2 on I-176; former I-176 routing
Berks	Caernarvon Township	29.729	47.844	PA 23 east (Main Street) – Elverson	Northern end of PA 23 concurrency
Berks	Caernarvon Township	30.684	49.381	I-76 Toll / Penna Turnpike	Exit 298 (Morgantown) on I-76 / Penna Turnpike
Berks	Caernarvon Township	30.684	49.381	I-176 north – Green Hills, Reading	Southern terminus and exit 1 on I-176
Berks	Robeson Township	37.980	61.123	PA 568 east (Green Hills Road) – Gibraltar	Southern end of PA 568 concurrency
Berks	Robeson Township	38.057	61.247	PA 568 west (Kurtz Mill Road) – Knauers, Maple Grove Park	Northern end of PA 568 concurrency
Berks	Robeson–Cumru township line	38.870	62.555	I-176 – Morgantown, Reading	Exit 7 on I-176
Berks	Cumru Township	41.859	67.366	PA 724 west (Philadelphia Avenue) – Shillington	Southern end of PA 724 concurrency
Berks	Cumru Township	41.938	67.493	PA 724 east (Philadelphia Avenue) – Birdsboro	Northern end of PA 724 concurrency
Berks	Reading	44.041	70.877	US 222 Bus. north (Lancaster Avenue) to US 422 – Allentown	Northern terminus; no access to US 222 Bus. south
1.000 mi = 1.609 km; 1.000 km = 0.621 mi: Concurrency terminus; Incomplete access
