= Pennsylvania Route 625 =

State highway in Pennsylvania, US

Pennsylvania Route 625

Route information
- Maintained by PennDOT
- Length: 16.687 mi (26.855 km)

Major junctions
- South end: PA 23 in East Earl Township
- PA 568 in Brecknock Township; PA 724 in Kenhorst
- North end: US 222 Bus. in Reading

Location
- Country: United States
- State: Pennsylvania
- Counties: Lancaster, Berks

Highway system
- Pennsylvania State Route System; Interstate; US; State; Scenic; Legislative
← PA 624	→ PA 629

Pennsylvania Route 625 (PA 625) is a 16.7-mile-long (26.9 km) state route in east central Pennsylvania, United States. The southern terminus is at PA 23 in East Earl Township. The northern terminus is U.S. Route 222 Business (US 222 Bus.) in Reading. PA 625 is a two-lane undivided road its entire length. The route runs through rural areas in the Pennsylvania Dutch Country of northeastern Lancaster County, passing through Bowmansville. PA 625 continues into Berks County and runs through more rural areas, intersecting PA 568 in Knauers before coming to a junction with PA 724. Past this intersection, the route heads into developed areas and passes through Kenhorst before coming to its northern terminus. The route was designated as the westernmost of segment of PA 73 in 1928, which continued past Reading to Philadelphia. By 1940, the entire length of PA 73 between Blue Ball and Reading was completely paved. PA 625 was designated onto its current alignment by 1966 following the rerouting of PA 73 to its current terminus at Leesport.

== Route description ==
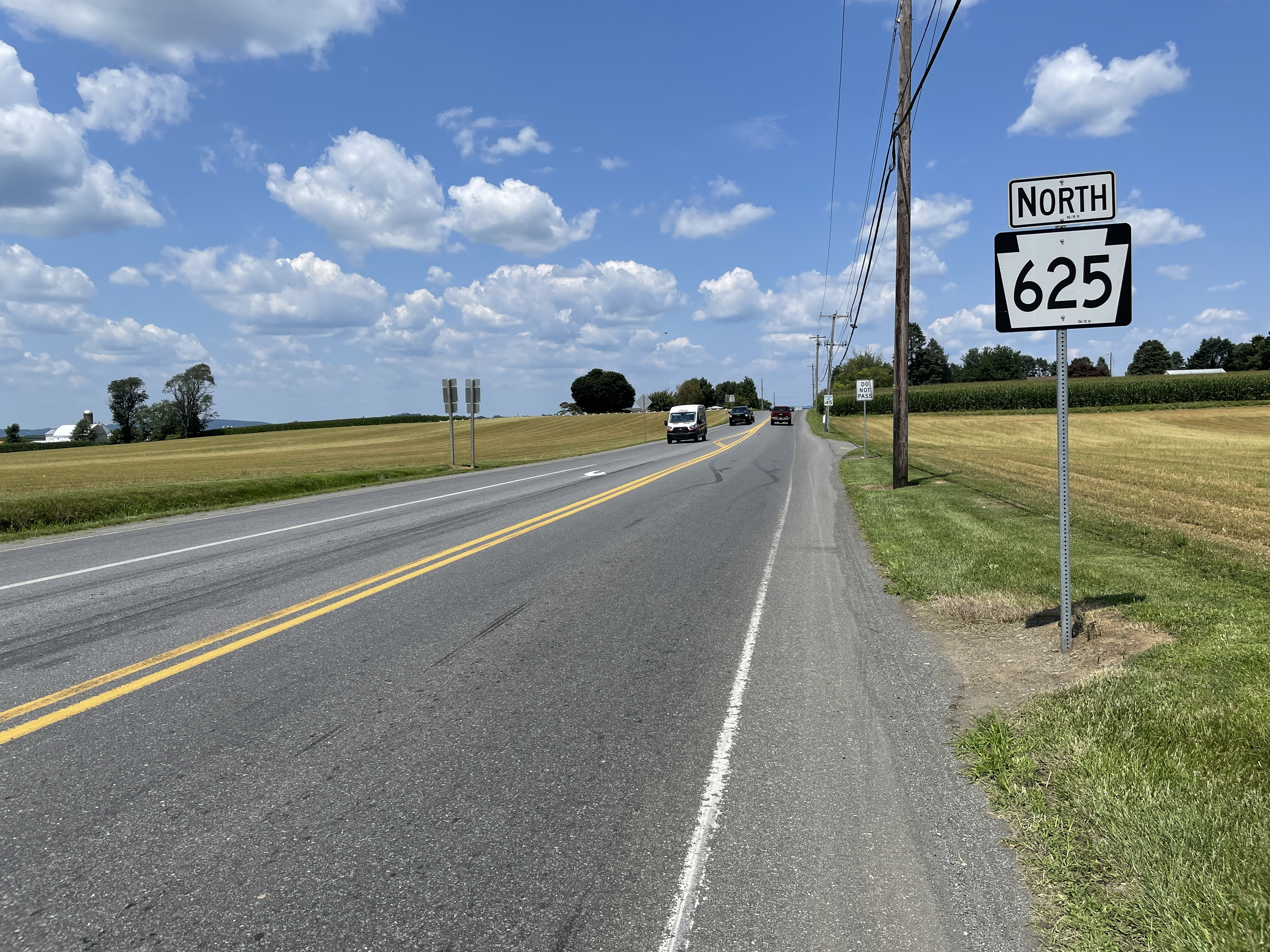
PA 625 northbound past its southern terminus at PA 23 in East Earl Township

PA 625 begins at an intersection with PA 23 west of the village of Goodville and east of Blue Ball in East Earl Township, Lancaster County, heading north on two-lane undivided Reading Road. The route passes through the Pennsylvania Dutch Country of eastern Lancaster County, which is home to many Amish farms. The road heads through agricultural areas with some homes, passing to the east of an industrial complex before crossing the Conestoga River. The route curves northeast through more farmland with a few trees and residences and turns north to cross Black Creek into Brecknock Township. PA 625 continues through rural areas with some development before it runs through the residential community of Bowmansville. North of Bowmansville, the road passes under the Pennsylvania Turnpike (Interstate 76). The route runs through a mix of farms, trees, and residential and commercial development to the east of parallel Muddy Creek, curving to the northeast.

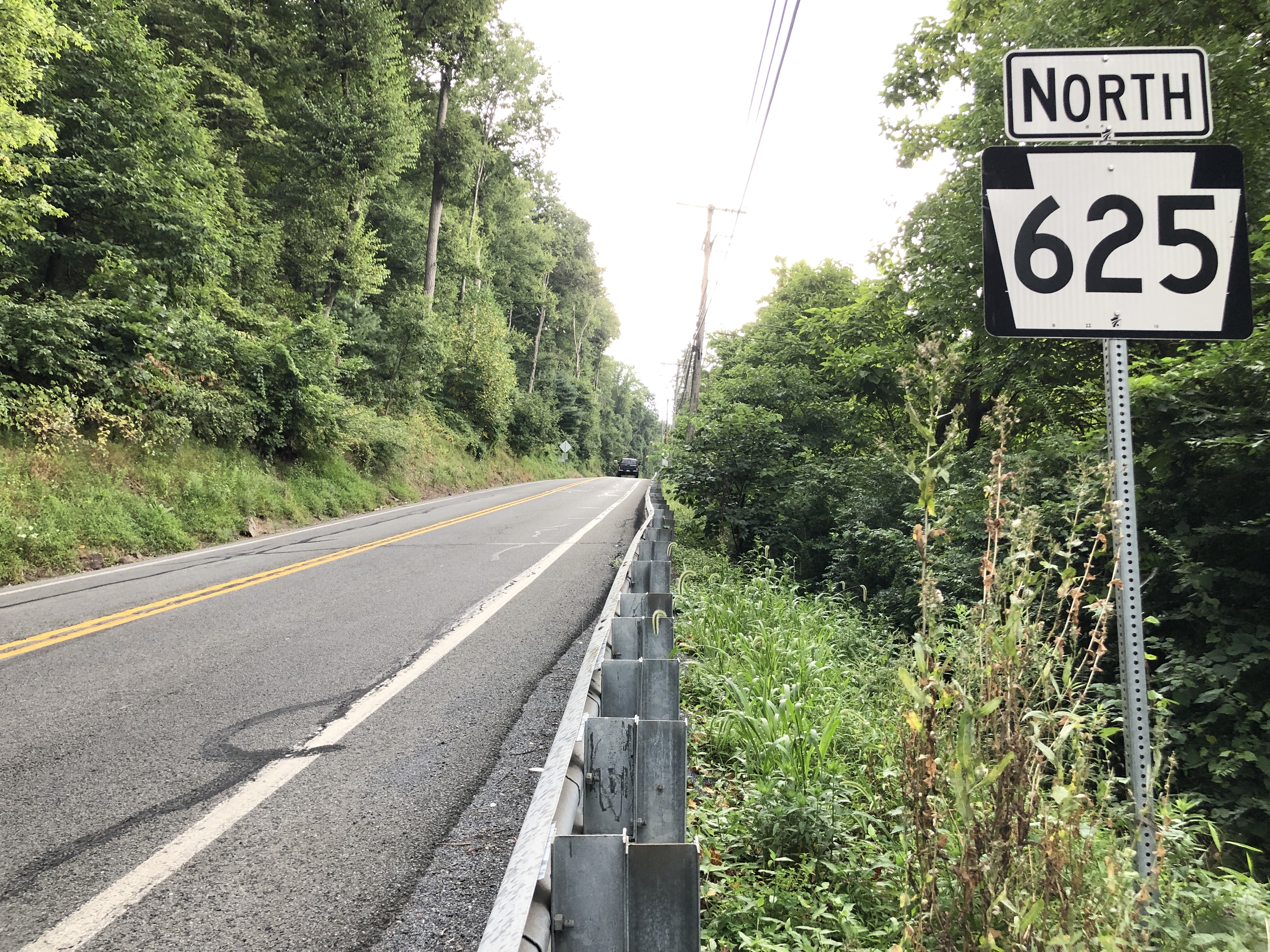
PA 625 northbound in Cumru Township

PA 625 enters Brecknock Township in Berks County and becomes New Holland Road, crossing Muddy Creek and passing through forested areas with some homes. The road runs through a mix of woods, fields, and residences as it reaches a junction with PA 568 in the community of Knauers. The route continues through rural land with some development and turns east to cross into Cumru Township. PA 625 curves northeast and becomes parallel to Angelica Creek, running through wooded areas with some homes and passing to the east of a golf course. The road winds north through forests and forms the eastern border of Nolde Forest Environmental Education Center. The route continues through woodland and comes to an intersection with PA 724. Past this intersection, PA 625 enters the borough of Kenhorst and passes businesses before it continues north through residential and commercial areas. The road curves northeast and continues past more homes. PA 625 continues into the city of Reading and soon comes to its northern terminus at US 222 Bus. southwest of the downtown area.

== History ==
When Pennsylvania first legislated routes in 1911, present-day PA 625 was not designated as part of a route. In 1928, the road between PA 23 in Blue Ball and Reading was designated as the westernmost part of PA 73, which continued through Reading northeast to Oley and southeast to Philadelphia. At this time, a portion of the road south of Reading was paved while the remainder south to Blue Ball was unpaved. By 1930, PA 73 was paved in the Bowmansville area and from south of Reading to south of Angelica; the remainder of the route between Blue Ball and Reading was under construction at this time. The entire length of road was paved by 1940. By 1966, PA 73 was realigned to head from Oley to Leesport, and PA 625 was designated on the former alignment between PA 23 in Blue Ball and US 222 (now US 222 Bus.) in Reading. PA 625 has remained on the same alignment since.

== Major intersections ==
County	Location	mi	km	Destinations	Notes
Lancaster	East Earl Township	0.000	0.000	PA 23 (Main Street) – Morgantown, New Holland, Lancaster	Southern terminus
Berks	Brecknock Township	9.674	15.569	PA 568 (Alleghenyville Road) – Adamstown, Green Hills, Gibraltar, Maple Grove Park	
Berks	Cumru Township–Kenhorst line	15.330	24.671	PA 724 (Philadelphia Avenue) – Shillington, Birdsboro	
Berks	Reading	16.687	26.855	US 222 Bus. (Lancaster Avenue) – Shillington, Lancaster, Reading	Northern terminus
1.000 mi = 1.609 km; 1.000 km = 0.621 mi

== PA 625 Truck ==
Pennsylvania Route 625 Truck
- Location: Berks County
- Existed: 2013–present

Pennsylvania Route 625 Truck (PA 625 Truck) is a truck route of PA 625 that bypassed a weight-restricted bridge over Angelica Creek in Cumru Township, on which trucks over 32 tons and combination loads over 40 tons were prohibited. The route follows PA 568, US 222, US 222 Bus., and PA 724. It was signed in 2013. The bridge was reconstructed in 2017, but as of October 2021, the route is still signed.
