= Angelica Creek =

Angelica Creek may refer to:

- Angelica Creek (Georgia)
- Angelica Creek (Pennsylvania)
