= West Sadsbury Township, Pennsylvania =

Township in Pennsylvania, US

West Sadsbury Township
- Township
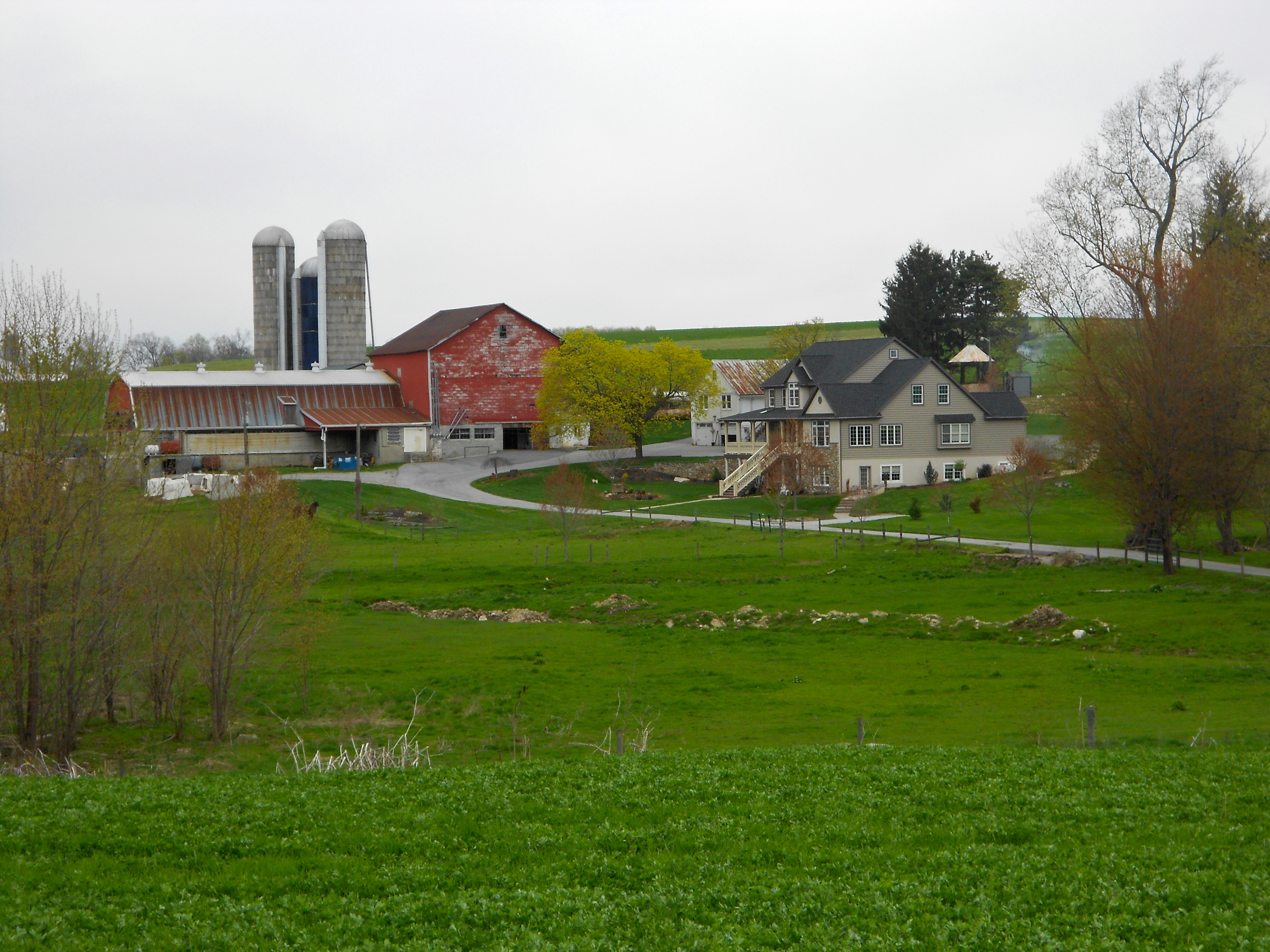
- Farm in the southern part of the township

- Location in Chester County and the state of Pennsylvania.

- Location of Pennsylvania in the United States
- Coordinates: 40°00′06″N 75°56′48″W
- Country: United States
- State: Pennsylvania
- County: Chester

Area
  - Total: 10.65 sq mi (27.59 km^{2})
  - Land: 10.61 sq mi (27.48 km^{2})
  - Water: 0.039 sq mi (0.10 km^{2})
- Elevation: 817 ft (249 m)

Population (2010)
  - Total: 2,444
  - Estimate (2016): 2,466
  - Density: 232.4/sq mi (89.72/km^{2})
- Time zone: UTC-5 (EST)
  - Summer (DST): UTC-4 (EDT)
- Area code: 610
- FIPS code: 42-029-83968
- Website: https://www.westsadsburytwp.org/

West Sadsbury Township is a township in Chester County, Pennsylvania, United States. The population was 2,444 at the 2010 census.

== Geography ==
According to the U.S. Census Bureau, the township has a total area of 10.7 square miles (28 km^{2}), all land.

== Transportation ==
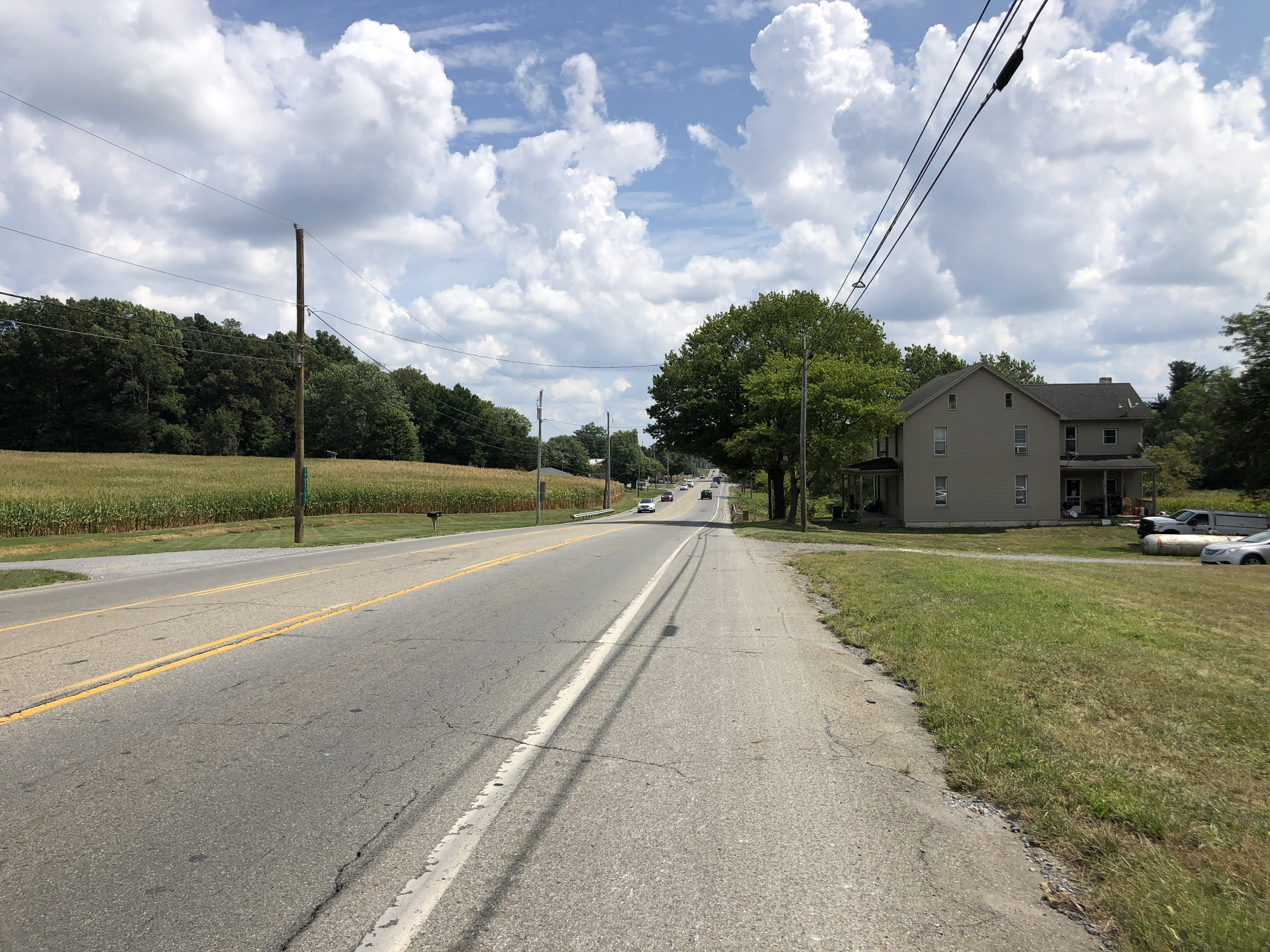
US 30 eastbound in West Sadsbury Township

As of 2018, there were 28.60 miles (46.03 km) of public roads in West Sadsbury Township, of which 5.86 miles (9.43 km) were maintained by the Pennsylvania Department of Transportation (PennDOT) and 22.74 miles (36.60 km) were maintained by the township.

U.S. Route 30 is the most prominent highway serving West Sadsbury Township. It follows the Lincoln Highway along an east–west alignment across the northern portion of the township. Pennsylvania Route 10 follows Octorara Trail along a north–south alignment along the northeastern border of the township. Pennsylvania Route 41 follows Gap Newport Pike along a northwest–southeast alignment across the southwestern portion of the township. Pennsylvania Route 372 follows Valley Road along an east–west alignment across the southern part of the township.

== Demographics ==
Historical population
Census	Pop.	Note	%±
1930	690		—
1940	655		−5.1%
1950	802		22.4%
1960	1,102		37.4%
1970	1,189		7.9%
1980	1,728		45.3%
1990	2,160		25.0%
2000	2,444		13.1%
2010	2,444		0.0%
2020	2,436		−0.3%

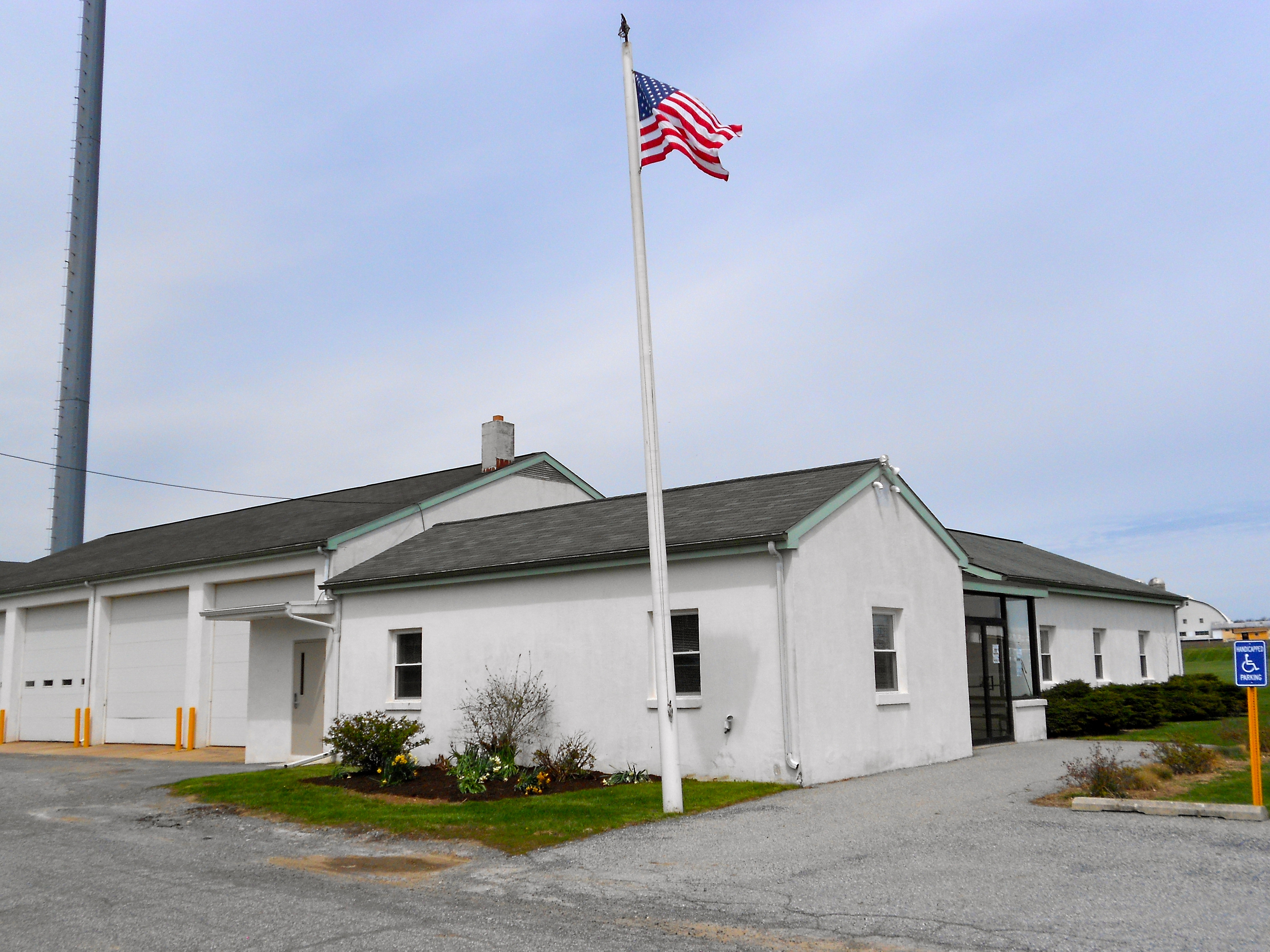
West Sadsbury Township Office

At the 2010 census, the township was 90.9% non-Hispanic White, 5.0% Black or African American, 0.1% Native American, 0.4% Asian, and 1.2% were two or more races. 2.4% of the population were of Hispanic or Latino ancestry.

At the 2000 census there were 2,444 people, 802 households, and 645 families living in the township. The population density was 229.1 inhabitants per square mile (88.5/km^{2}). There were 818 housing units at an average density of 76.7 per square mile (29.6/km^{2}). The racial makeup of the township was 93.45% White, 5.16% African American, 0.16% Native American, 0.29% Asian, 0.33% from other races, and 0.61% from two or more races. Hispanic or Latino of any race were 0.78%.

There were 802 households, 39.3% had children under the age of 18 living with them, 70.2% were married couples living together, 7.2% had a female householder with no husband present, and 19.5% were non-families. 16.5% of households were made up of individuals, and 6.9% were one person aged 65 or older. The average household size was 3.04 and the average family size was 3.43.

The age distribution was 29.3% under the age of 18, 7.2% from 18 to 24, 28.7% from 25 to 44, 24.3% from 45 to 64, and 10.4% 65 or older. The median age was 36 years. For every 100 females, there were 102.2 males. For every 100 females age 18 and over, there were 100.8 males.

The median household income was $52,031 and the median family income was $60,909. Males had a median income of $40,765 versus $25,966 for females. The per capita income for the township was $19,839. About 4.2% of families and 7.2% of the population were below the poverty line, including 10.5% of those under age 18 and 6.6% of those age 65 or over.
