= Highland Township, Chester County, Pennsylvania =

Township in Pennsylvania, US

Highland Township
- Township
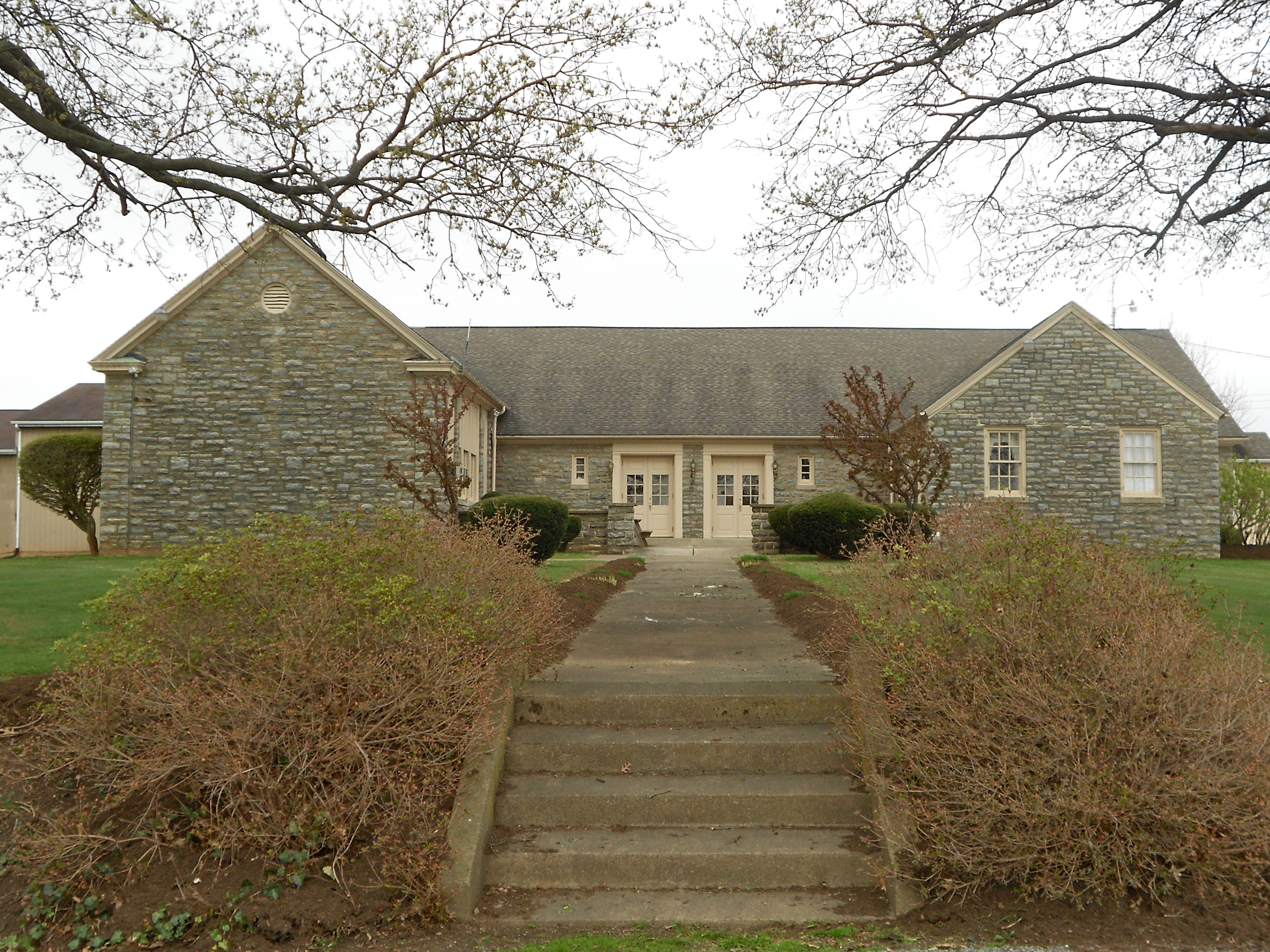
- Highland Township building

- Location of Highland Township in Chester County, Pennsylvania (top) and of Chester County in Pennsylvania (below)

- Location of Pennsylvania in the United States
- Coordinates: 39°56′16″N 75°54′00″W
- Country: United States
- State: Pennsylvania
- County: Chester

Area
  - Total: 17.19 sq mi (44.51 km^{2})
  - Land: 17.12 sq mi (44.33 km^{2})
  - Water: 0.069 sq mi (0.18 km^{2})
- Elevation: 607 ft (185 m)

Population (2010)
  - Total: 1,272
  - Estimate (2016): 1,282
  - Density: 74.9/sq mi (28.92/km^{2})
- Time zone: UTC-5 (EST)
  - Summer (DST): UTC-4 (EDT)
- Area code: 610
- FIPS code: 42-029-34448
- Website: https://highlandtwp1853.org/

Highland Township is a township in Chester County, Pennsylvania, United States. It was founded in 1853 when West Fallowfield Township was divided and the division with the higher elevation was named Highland Township. The population was 1,272 at the 2010 census.

== Geography ==
According to the U.S. Census Bureau, the township has a total area of 17.2 square miles (45 km^{2}), all of which is land.

== Transportation ==
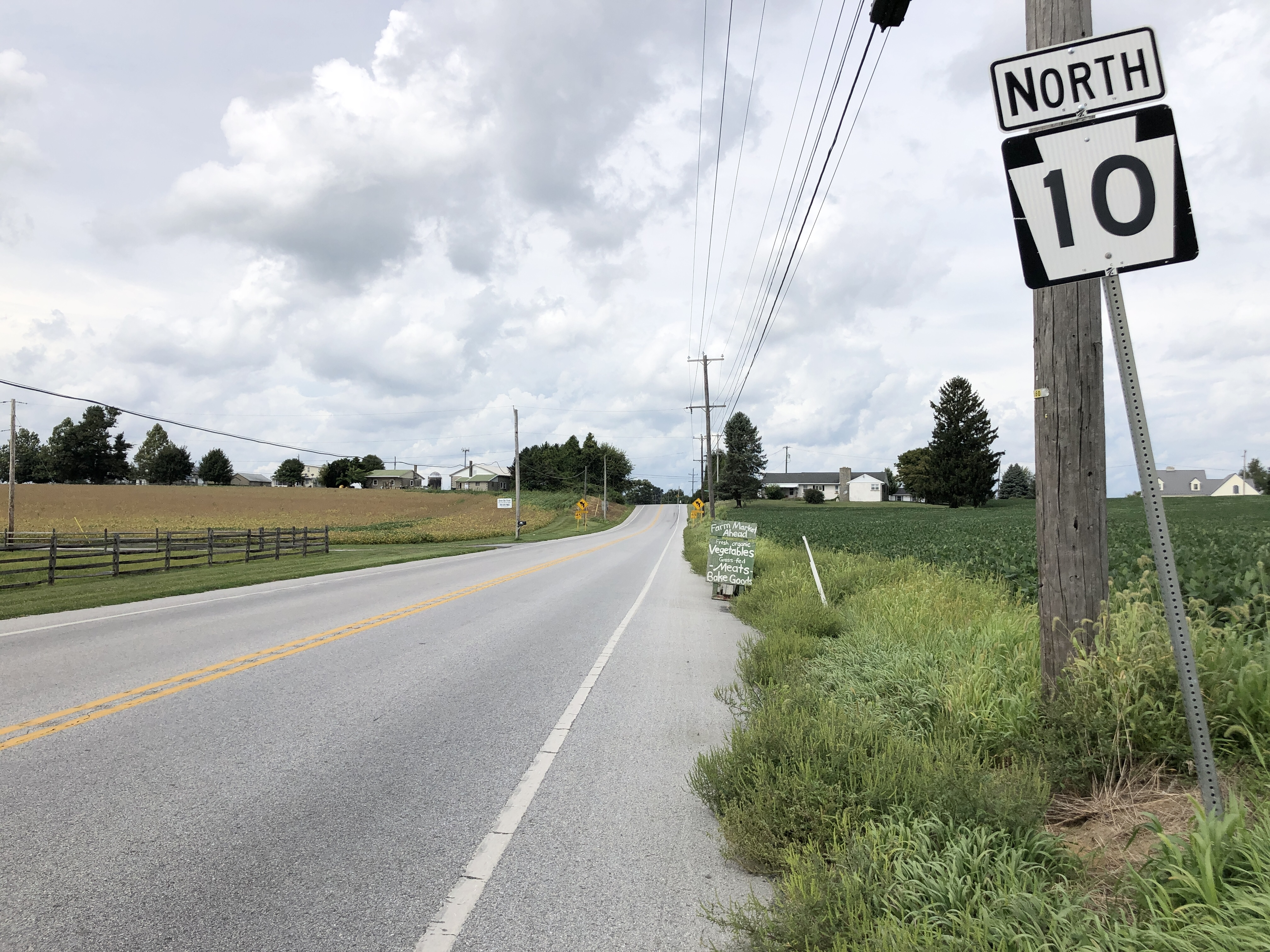
PA 10 northbound in Highland Township

As of 2018, there were 49.07 miles (78.97 km) of public roads in Highland Township, of which 21.36 miles (34.38 km) were maintained by the Pennsylvania Department of Transportation (PennDOT) and 27.71 miles (44.59 km) were maintained by the township.

Pennsylvania Route 10 is the only numbered highway serving Highland Township. It follows Limestone Road along a north–south alignment through the western portion of the township.

== Demographics ==
At the 2010 census, the township was 85.6% non-Hispanic White, 4.2% Black or African American, 0.2% Native American, 0.3% Asian, and 1.9% were two or more races. 8.7% of the population were of Hispanic or Latino ancestry.

Historical population
| Census | Pop. | Note | %± |
|---|---|---|---|
| 1930 | 792 | | — |
| 1940 | 827 | | 4.4% |
| 1950 | 904 | | 9.3% |
| 1960 | 1,029 | | 13.8% |
| 1970 | 1,248 | | 21.3% |
| 1980 | 1,244 | | −0.3% |
| 1990 | 1,199 | | −3.6% |
| 2000 | 1,125 | | −6.2% |
| 2010 | 1,272 | | 13.1% |
| 2020 | 1,259 | | −1.0% |

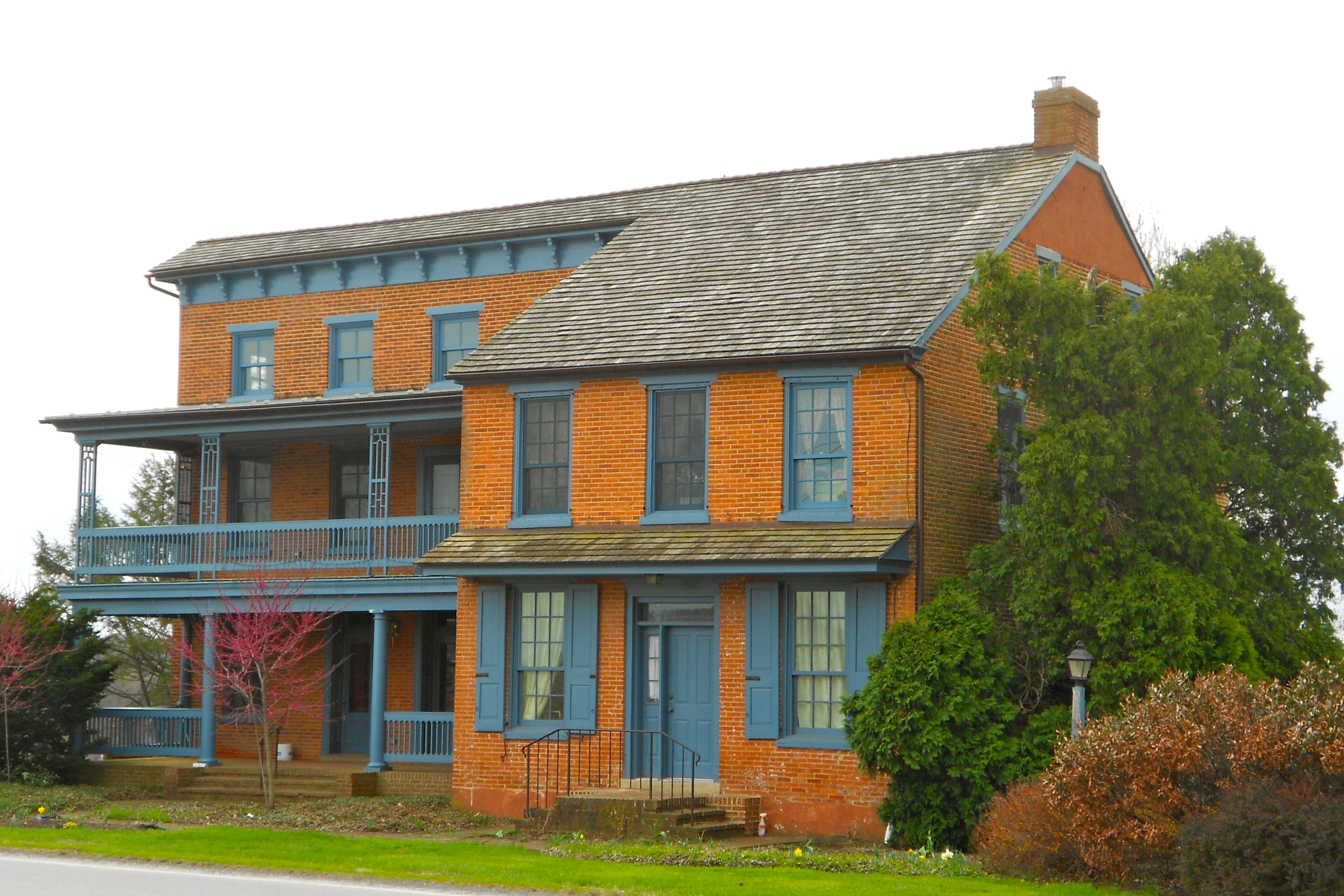
House on Gum Tree Rd.

At the 2000 census there were 1,125 people, 433 households, and 323 families living in the township. The population density was 65.3 inhabitants per square mile (25.2/km^{2}). There were 459 housing units at an average density of 26.7 per square mile (10.3/km^{2}). The racial makeup of the township was 93.24% White, 4.89% African American, 0.44% Asian, 0.89% from other races, and 0.53% from two or more races. Hispanic or Latino of any race were 2.04%.

There were 433 households, 28.4% had children under the age of 18 living with them, 62.8% were married couples living together, 8.3% had a female householder with no husband present, and 25.2% were non-families. 21.0% of households were made up of individuals, and 6.7% were one person aged 65 or older. The average household size was 2.60 and the average family size was 3.02.

The age distribution was 22.6% under the age of 18, 6.8% from 18 to 24, 29.9% from 25 to 44, 27.8% from 45 to 64, and 13.0% 65 or older. The median age was 40 years. For every 100 females, there were 95.0 males. For every 100 females age 18 and over, there were 96.2 males.

The median household income was $55,500 and the median family income was $61,875. Males had a median income of $39,318 versus $30,114 for females. The per capita income for the township was $24,113. About 3.9% of families and 6.1% of the population were below the poverty line, including 8.7% of those under age 18 and 14.4% of those age 65 or over.
