= Kenhorst, Pennsylvania =

Borough in Pennsylvania, US

- Borough
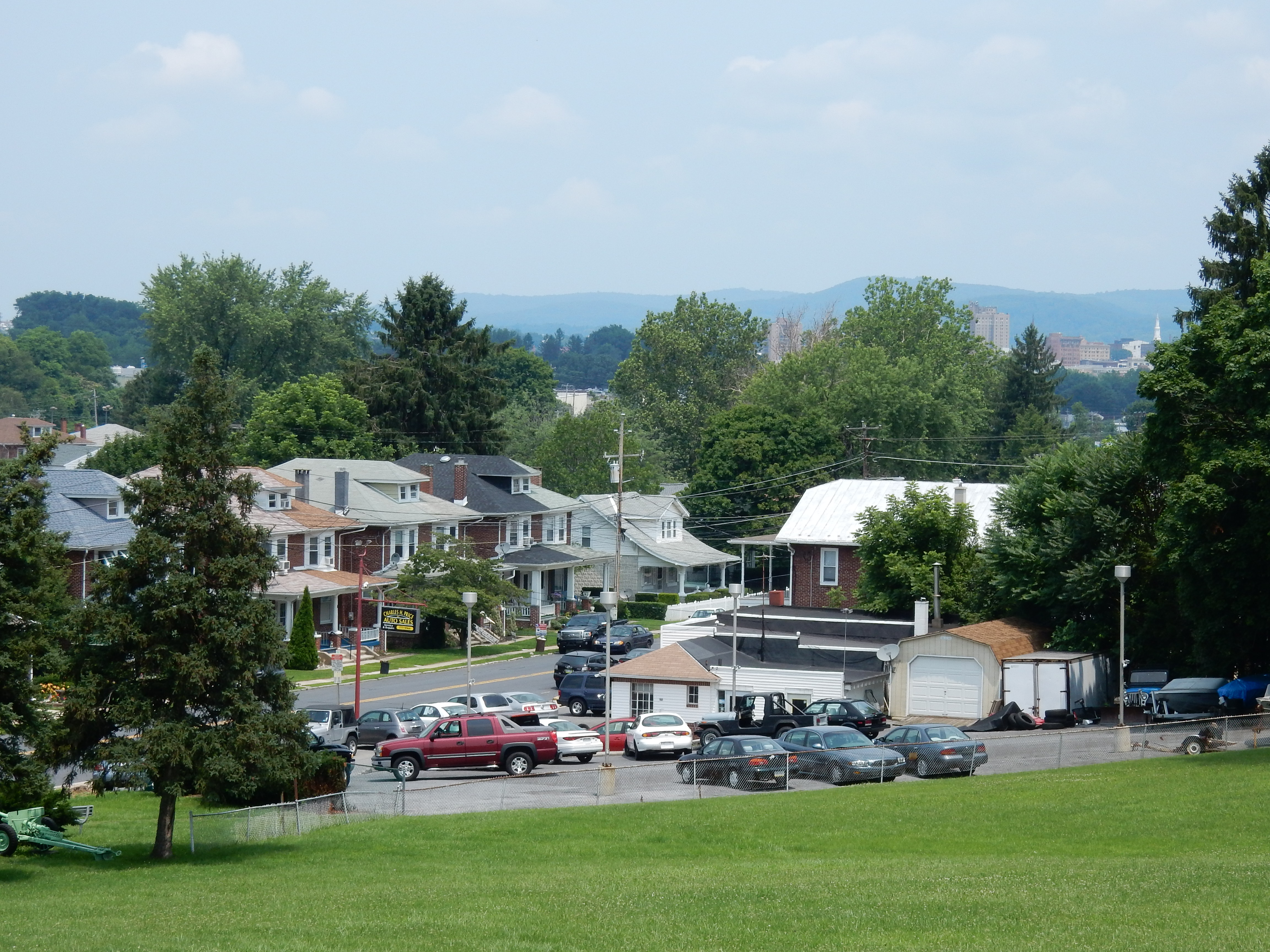
- New Holland Rd., Kenhorst.

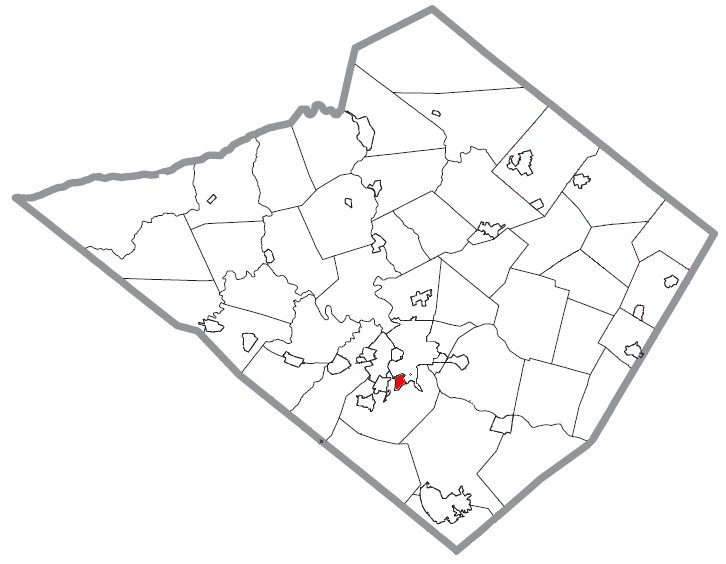
- Location of Kenhorst in Berks County, Pennsylvania.

- Location of Kenhorst in Pennsylvania Kenhorst (the United States)
- Coordinates: 40°18′29″N 75°56′39″W
- Country: United States
- State: Pennsylvania
- County: Berks
- Founded: August 25, 1931

Government
  - Mayor: Nickolas J. Hatzas

Area
  - Total: 0.59 sq mi (1.52 km^{2})
  - Land: 0.59 sq mi (1.52 km^{2})
  - Water: 0 sq mi (0.00 km^{2})
- Elevation: 344 ft (105 m)

Population (2020)
  - Total: 3,001
  - Density: 5,120.1/sq mi (1,976.89/km^{2})
- Time zone: UTC-5 (EST)
  - Summer (DST): UTC-4 (EDT)
- ZIP code: 19607
- Area codes: 610 and 484
- FIPS code: 42-39256
- Website: www.kenhorstborough.com

Kenhorst (/ˈkɛnhərst/ KEN-hərst) is a borough in Berks County, Pennsylvania, United States. The population was 3,001 at the 2020 census.

== Geography ==
Kenhorst is located in central Berks County at 40°18′29″N 75°56′39″W (40.308092, -75.944042). It is bordered by the city of Reading to the north and east and by Cumru Township to the south and west, including the census-designated place of Grill to the southeast.

According to the United States Census Bureau, the borough has a total area of 0.58 square miles (1.5 km^{2}), all land.

== Transportation ==
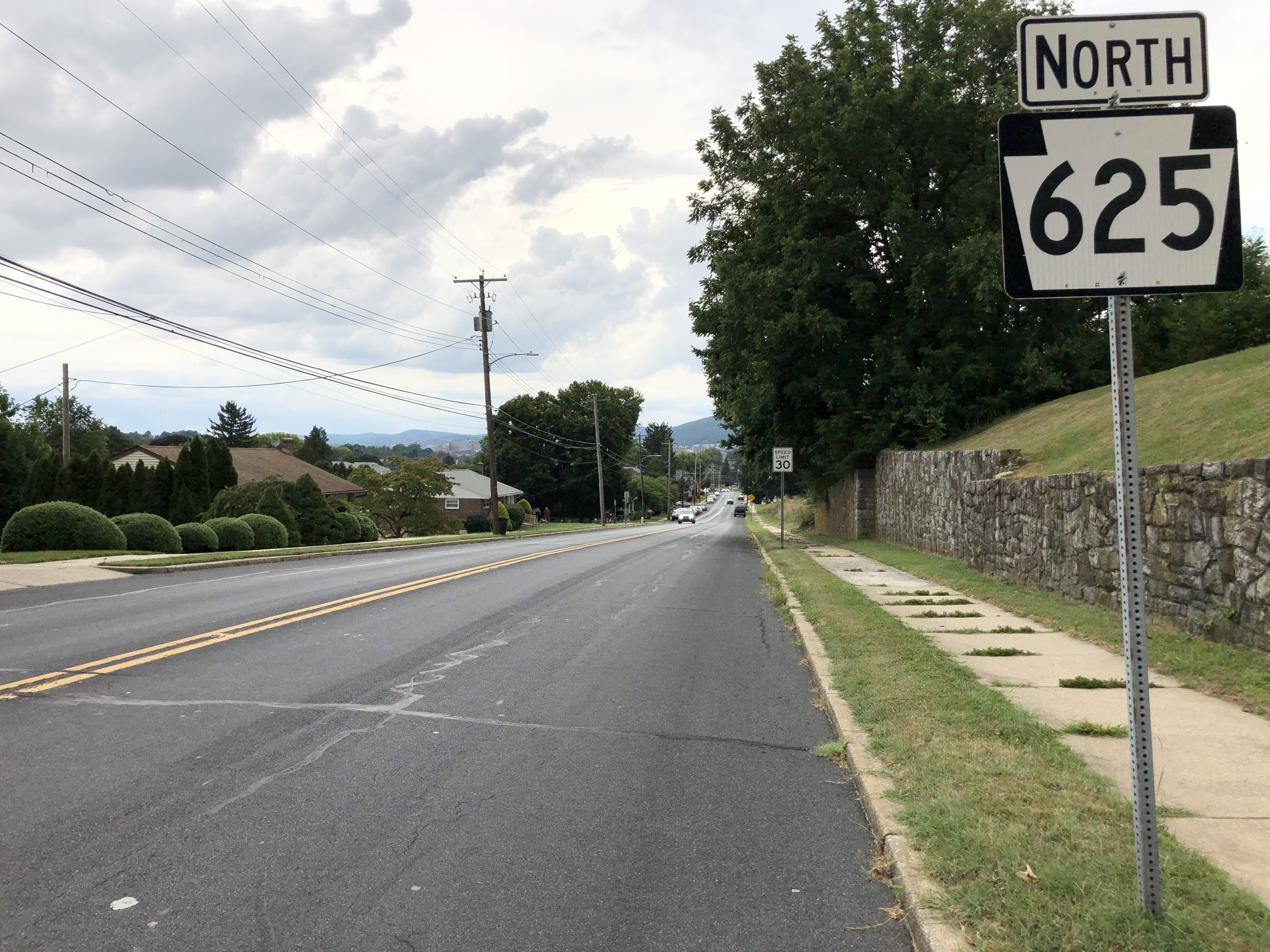
PA 625 northbound in Kenhorst

As of 2012, there were 10.74 miles (17.28 km) of public roads in Kenhorst, of which 1.61 miles (2.59 km) were maintained by the Pennsylvania Department of Transportation (PennDOT) and 9.13 miles (14.69 km) were maintained by the borough.

Pennsylvania Route 625 follows New Holland Road on a north-south alignment through the heart of Kenhorst. U.S. Route 222 Business follows Lancaster Avenue along a northeast-southwest alignment along the northwest edge of the borough. Pennsylvania Route 724 follows Philadelphia Avenue on an east-west alignment along the south edge of the borough.

== Demographics ==
Historical population
Census	Pop.	Note	%±
1940	2,227		—
1950	2,551		14.5%
1960	2,815		10.3%
1970	3,482		23.7%
1980	3,187		−8.5%
1990	2,918		−8.4%
2000	2,679		−8.2%
2010	2,877		7.4%
2020	3,001		4.3%

=== 2020 census ===
As of the 2020 census, Kenhorst had a population of 3,001. The median age was 39.0 years. 21.8% of residents were under the age of 18 and 16.7% of residents were 65 years of age or older. For every 100 females there were 100.1 males, and for every 100 females age 18 and over there were 94.9 males age 18 and over.

100.0% of residents lived in urban areas, while 0.0% lived in rural areas.

There were 1,201 households in Kenhorst, of which 31.5% had children under the age of 18 living in them. Of all households, 42.5% were married-couple households, 20.7% were households with a male householder and no spouse or partner present, and 26.8% were households with a female householder and no spouse or partner present. About 28.4% of all households were made up of individuals and 13.4% had someone living alone who was 65 years of age or older.

There were 1,248 housing units, of which 3.8% were vacant. The homeowner vacancy rate was 1.9% and the rental vacancy rate was 5.6%.

Racial composition as of the 2020 census
Race	Number	Percent
White	2,179	72.6%
Black or African American	105	3.5%
American Indian and Alaska Native	15	0.5%
Asian	47	1.6%
Native Hawaiian and Other Pacific Islander	5	0.2%
Some other race	343	11.4%
Two or more races	307	10.2%
Hispanic or Latino (of any race)	733	24.4%

=== 2000 census ===
As of the 2000 census, there were 2,679 people, 1,215 households, and 789 families living in the borough. The population density was 4,551.8 inhabitants per square mile (1,757.5/km^{2}). There were 1,254 housing units at an average density of 2,130.6 per square mile (822.6/km^{2}). The racial makeup of the borough was 95.86% White, 0.82% African American, 0.04% Native American, 1.61% Asian, 1.05% from other races, and 0.63% from two or more races. Hispanic or Latino of any race were 2.02% of the population.

There were 1,215 households, out of which 22.2% had children under the age of 18 living with them, 53.9% were married couples living together, 8.4% had a female householder with no husband present, and 35.0% were non-families. 30.0% of all households were made up of individuals, and 14.0% had someone living alone who was 65 years of age or older. The average household size was 2.20 and the average family size was 2.72.

In the borough the population was spread out, with 18.4% under the age of 18, 4.3% from 18 to 24, 29.9% from 25 to 44, 22.8% from 45 to 64, and 24.6% who were 65 years of age or older. The median age was 43 years. For every 100 females there were 93.7 males. For every 100 females age 18 and over, there were 91.2 males.

The median income for a household in the borough was $40,452, and the median income for a family was $44,762. Males had a median income of $37,243 versus $27,162 for females. The per capita income for the borough was $21,379. About 6.1% of families and 7.9% of the population were below the poverty line, including 12.0% of those under age 18 and 14.1% of those age 65 or over.

== Gallery ==
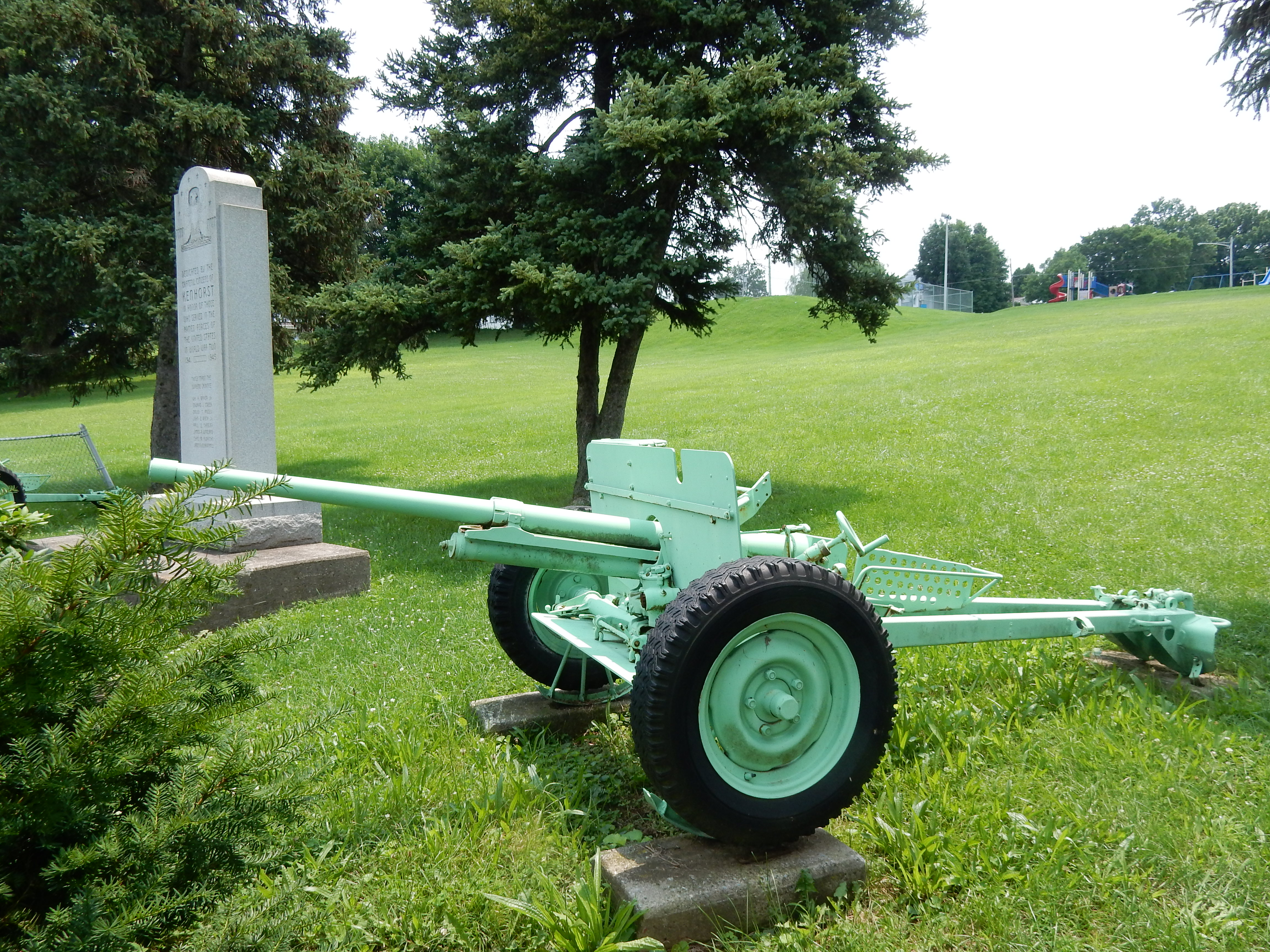
War Memorial in Kenhorst.

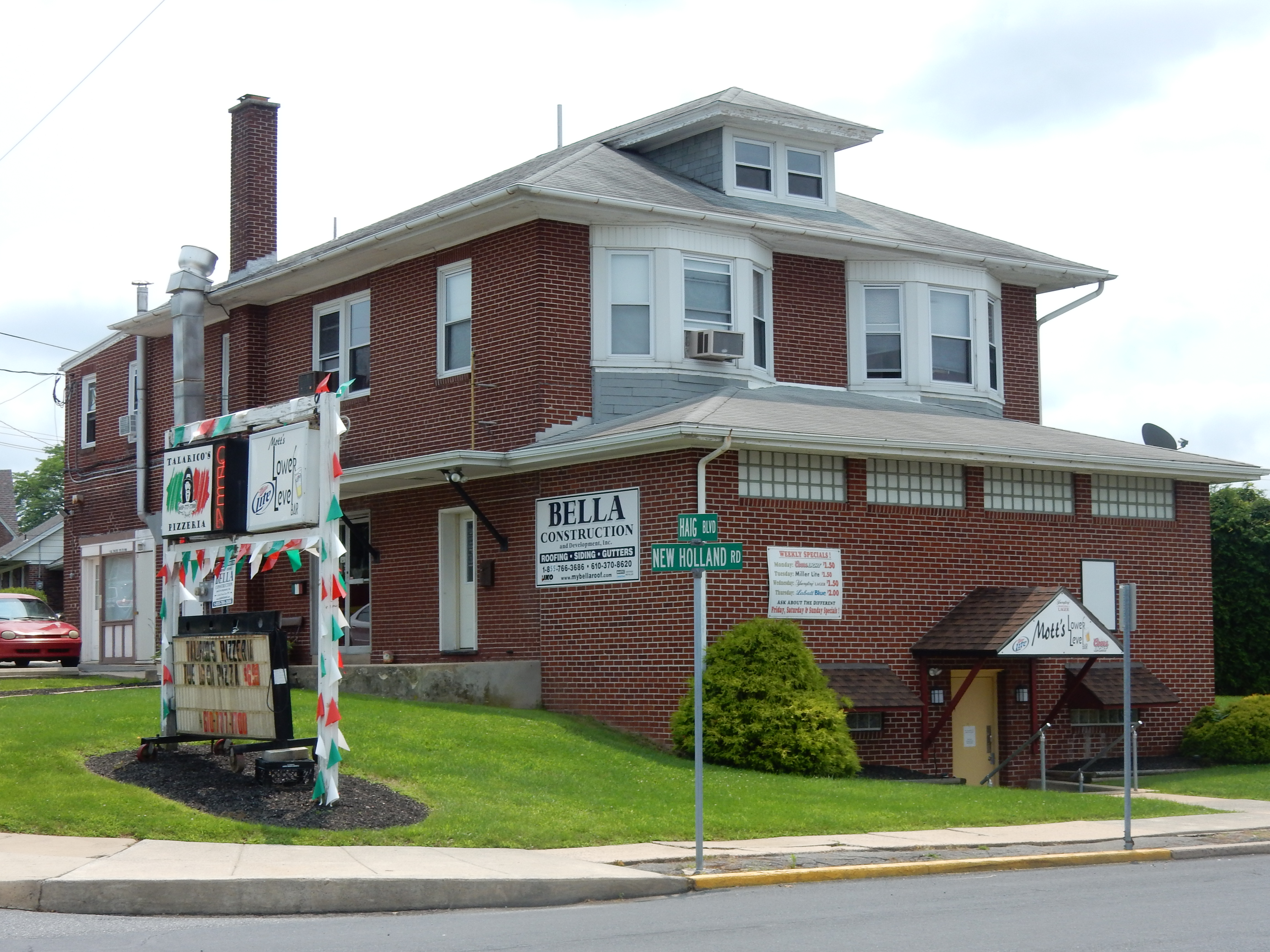
New Holland Rd.

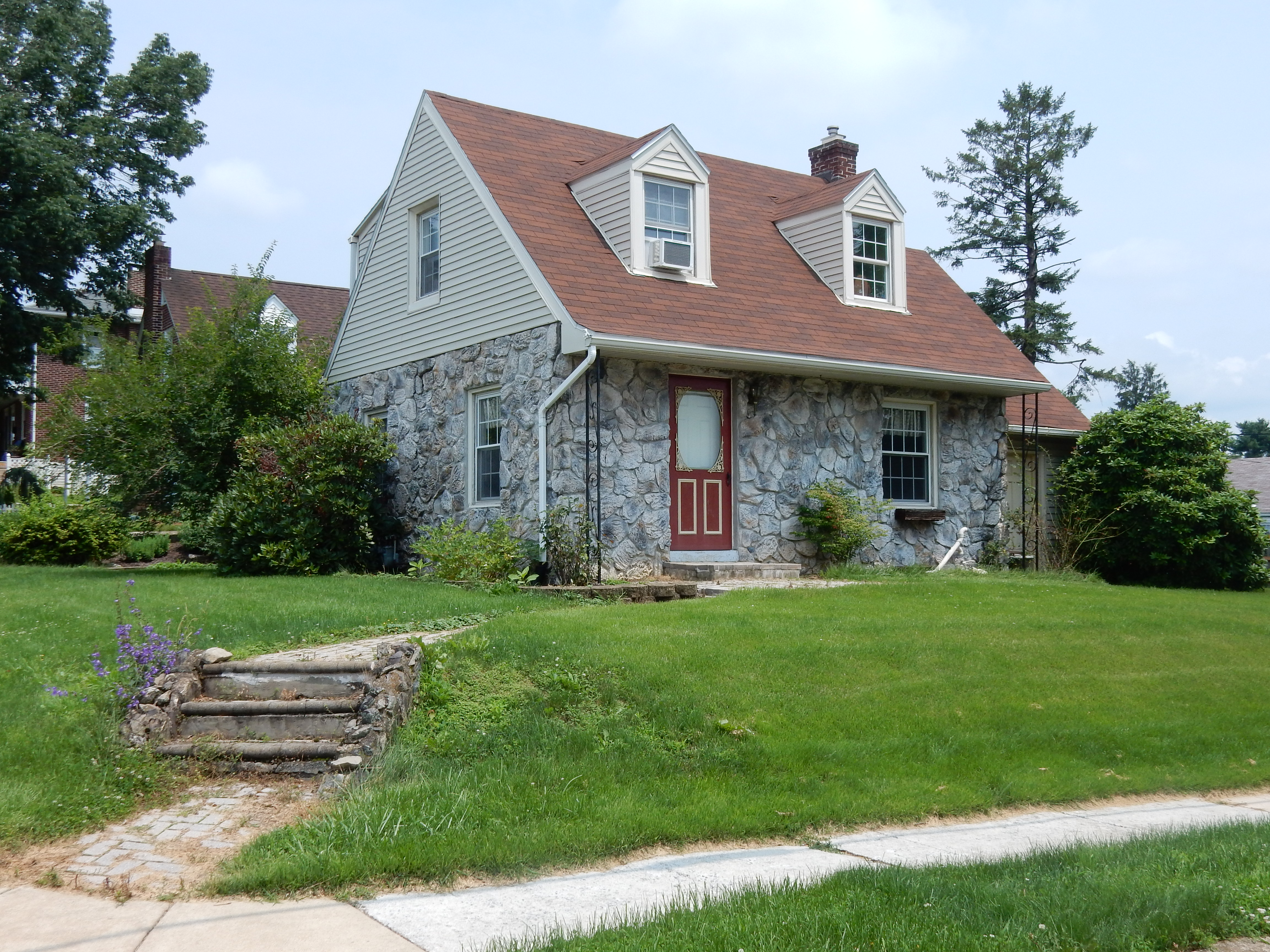
Lacrosse Ave.

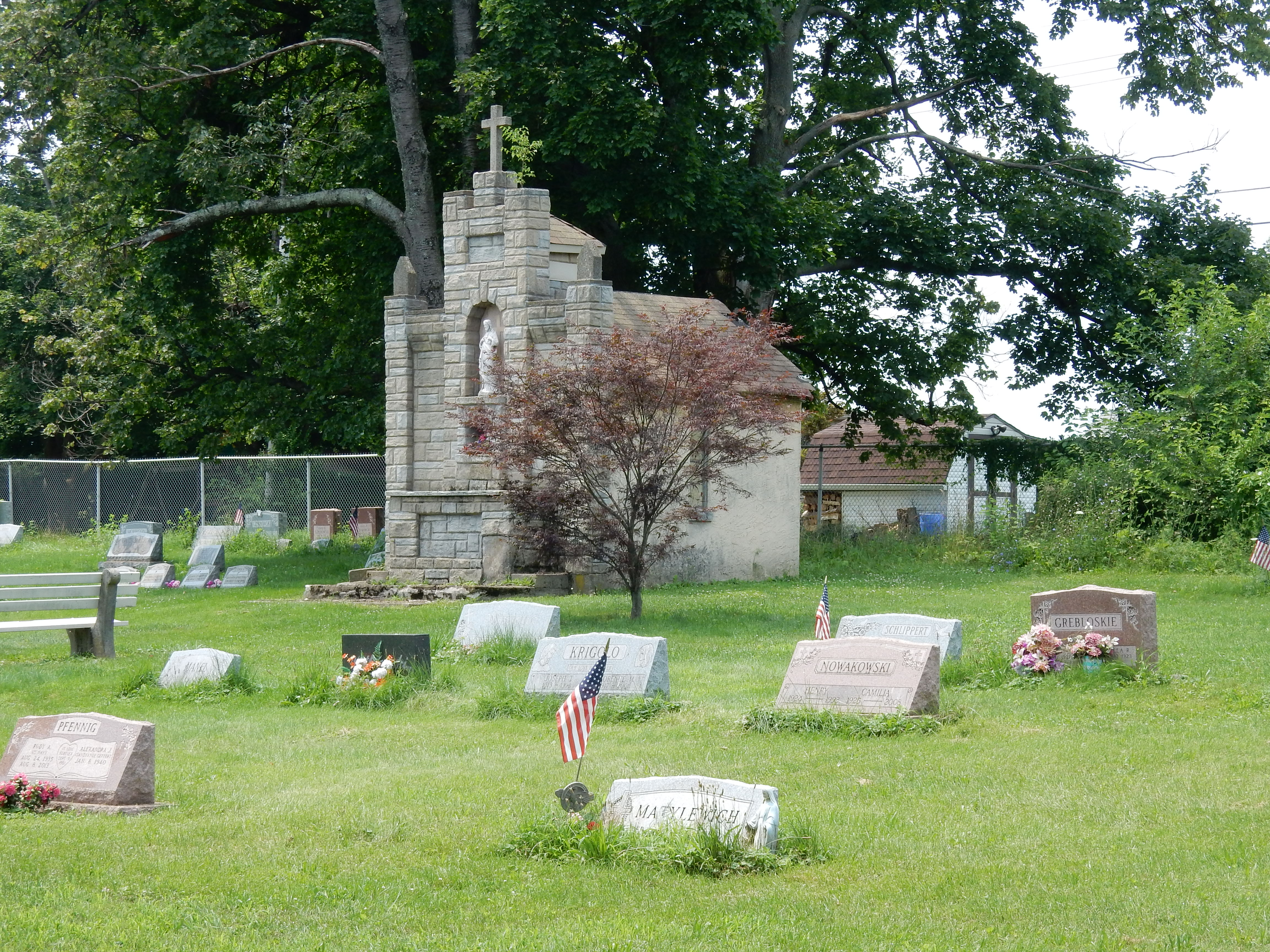
St. Stephen's Memorial Cemetery.

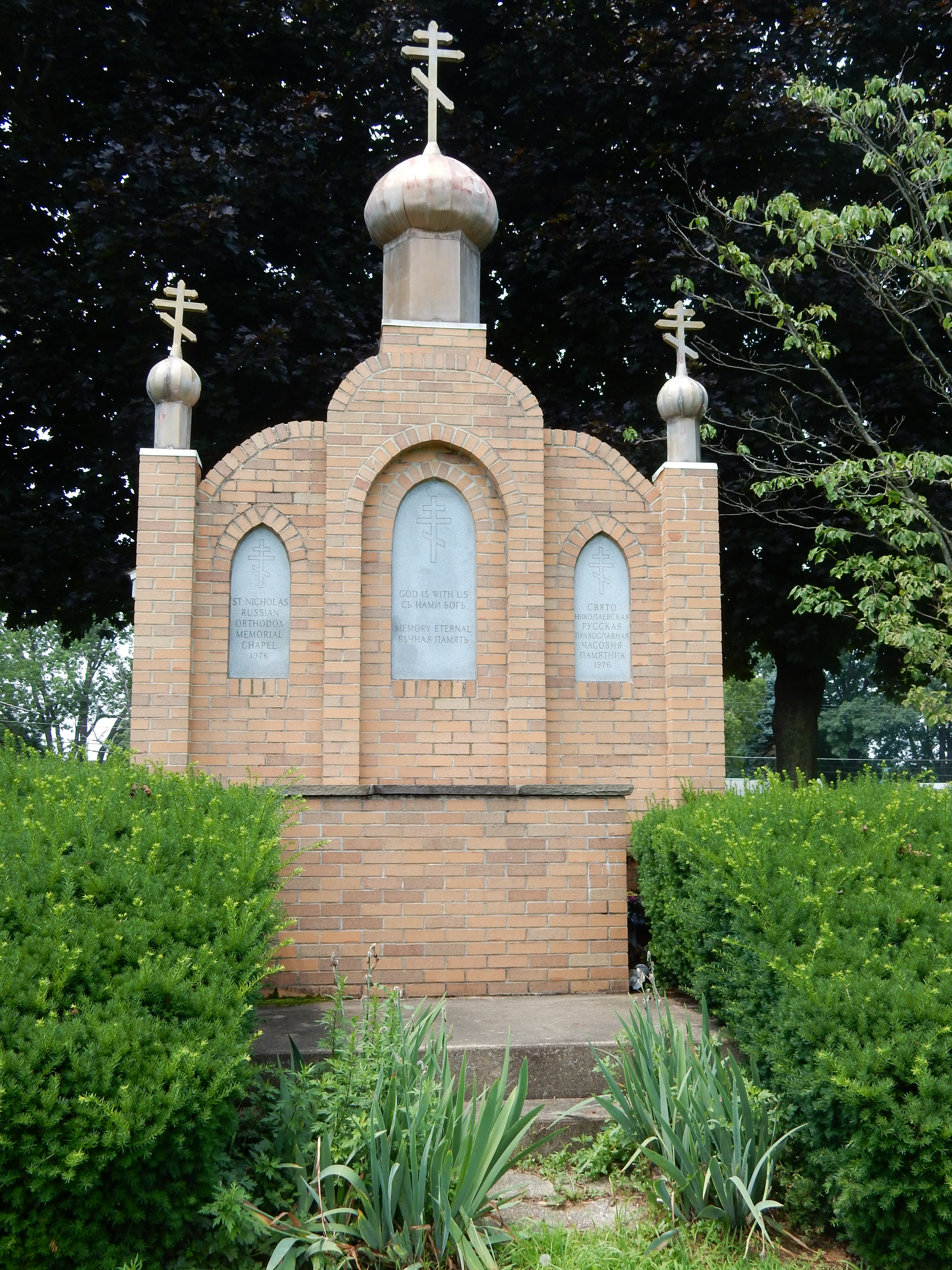
St. Nicolas Chapel at Memorial Cemetery.
