= Allegheny Creek =

Stream in Pennsylvania, USA

Allegheny Creek Tributary to Schuykill River
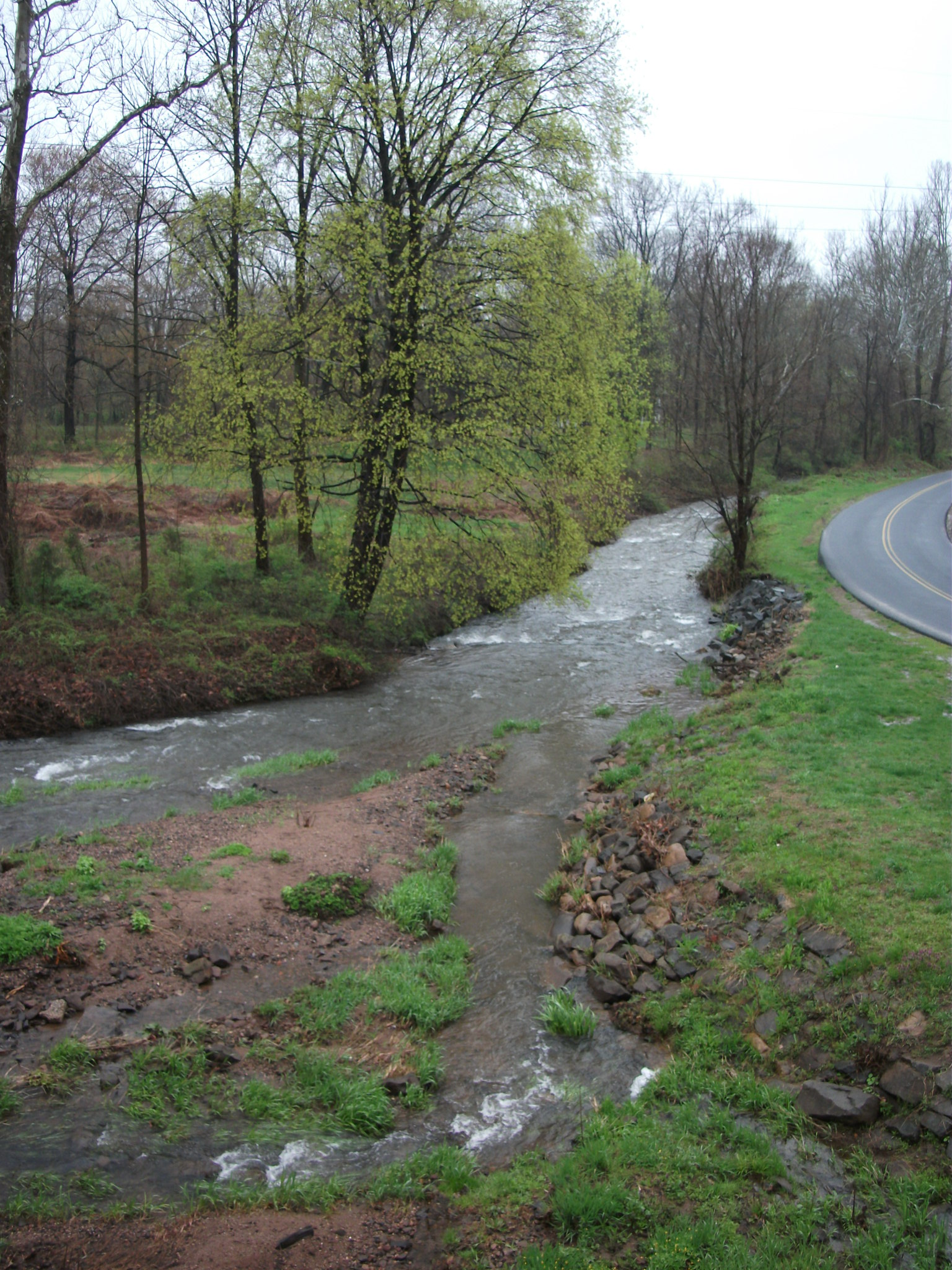
- Allegheny Creek at Allegheny Aqueduct in Gibraltar, Pennsylvania.

- Location of Allegheny Creek mouth Allegheny Creek (the United States)

Location
- Country: United States
- State: Pennsylvania
- County: Berks

Physical characteristics
- Source: Muddy Creek divide
  - location: about 1.5 miles south of Alleghenyville, Pennsylvania
  - coordinates: 40°14′21″N 075°59′32″W
  - elevation: 640 ft (200 m)
- Mouth: Schuylkill River
  - location: Gibraltar, Pennsylvania
  - coordinates: 40°17′20″N 075°52′31″W
  - elevation: 154 ft (47 m)
- Length: 10.84 mi (17.45 km)
- Basin size: 17.85 square miles (46.2 km^{2})
- Discharge
  - location: Schuylkill River
  - average: 27.25 cu ft/s (0.772 m^{3}/s) at mouth with Allegheny Creek

Basin features
- Progression: Schuylkill River → Delaware River → Delaware Bay → → Atlantic Ocean
- River system: Schuylkill River
- Tributaries
  - left: unnamed tributaries
  - right: Sleepy Hollow Run
- Waterbodies: Green Hills Lake
- Bridges: PA 568, Horning Road, Maple Grove Road, Gebhart School Road, Hartz Store Road, Gunhart Road, I-76, PA 10, Seton Road, PA 568, Evergreen Road, Everts Lane, Tumbleweed Way, White Bear Way, Green Hills Road, Old River Way

Allegheny Creek is an 11.3-mile-long (18.2 km) tributary of the Schuylkill River in Berks County, Pennsylvania in the United States.

The origin of Allegheny Creek is Green Hills Lake in the community of Green Hills. Allegheny Creek joins the Schuylkill River at the village of Gibraltar.

It is crossed by the Allegheny Aqueduct, built as part of the Schuylkill Canal in 1824.

== See also ==
- List of rivers of Pennsylvania
