= Angelica Creek (Georgia) =

Stream in Georgia, U.S.

Coordinates: 32°06′24″N 84°14′45″W

Location
- Country: United States
- State: Georgia

Angelica Creek is a stream in the U.S. state of Georgia.

Angelica Creek was named after the genus Angelica, which American Indians believed held medicinal qualities. Native variant names were "Muckaloochee Creek" and "Notosahatchie Creek".

== See also ==
- List of rivers of Georgia (U.S. state)
