= Knauers, Pennsylvania =

Unincorporated community in Pennsylvania, US

- Unincorporated community
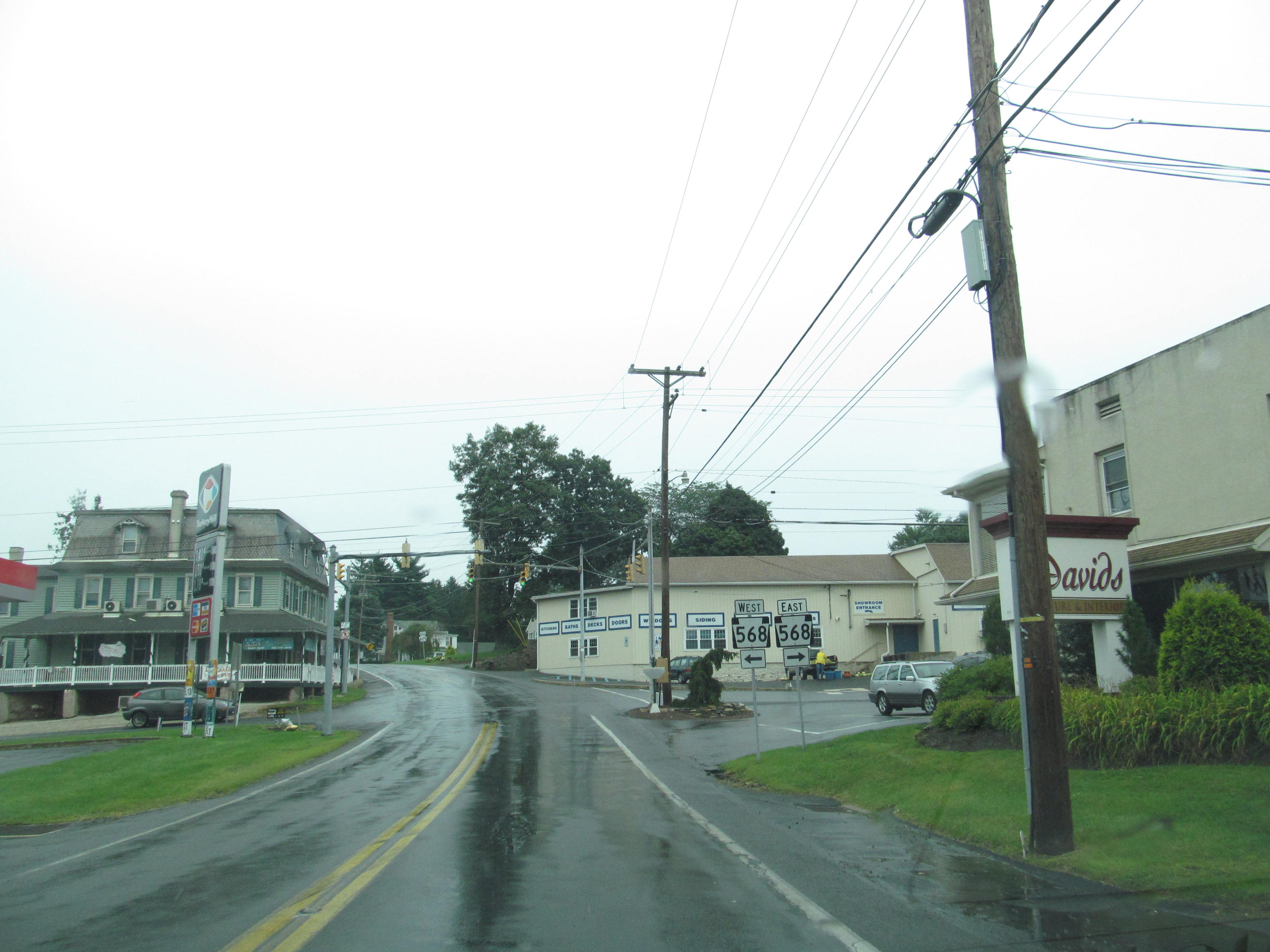
- PA 625 northbound in the center of Knauers

- Location within Pennsylvania Location within the United States
- Coordinates: 40°14′48″N 75°59′51″W
- Country: United States
- State: Pennsylvania
- County: Berks
- Township: Brecknock
- Elevation: 774 ft (236 m)
- Time zone: UTC-5 (Eastern (EST))
  - Summer (DST): UTC-4 (EDT)
- ZIP code: 19540
- Area codes: 610 and 484
- GNIS feature ID: 1178600

Knauers is a community in Brecknock Township, Berks County, Pennsylvania, United States, 3.4 miles from Adamstown and 0.9 miles from Alleghenyville.
