= Alleghenyville, Pennsylvania =

Unincorporated community in Pennsylvania, US

- Census-designated place
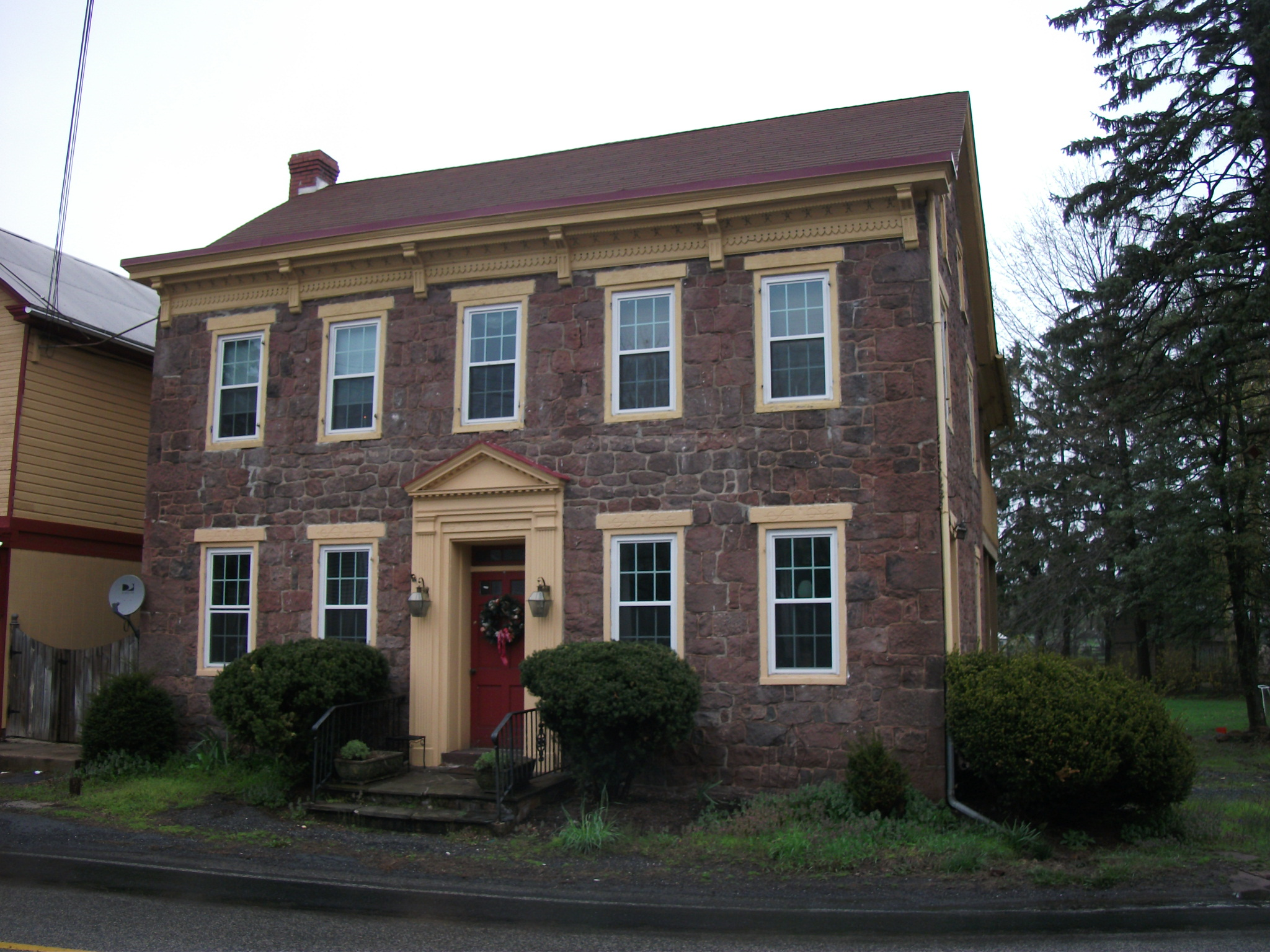

- Location within Pennsylvania Location within the United States
- Coordinates: 40°14′03″N 75°59′19″W
- Country: United States
- State: Pennsylvania
- County: Berks
- Township: Brecknock

Area
  - Total: 2.62 sq mi (6.78 km^{2})
  - Land: 2.61 sq mi (6.76 km^{2})
  - Water: 0.0077 sq mi (0.02 km^{2})
- Elevation: 564 ft (172 m)

Population (2020)
  - Total: 1,015
  - Density: 388.7/sq mi (150.07/km^{2})
- Time zone: UTC-5 (Eastern (EST))
  - Summer (DST): UTC-4 (EDT)
- ZIP code: 19540
- Area codes: 610 and 484
- FIPS code: 42-00924
- GNIS feature ID: 1168177

Alleghenyville is a census-designated place (CDP) in Brecknock Township, Berks County, Pennsylvania, United States. It is located near the Lancaster County line, and is served by the Governor Mifflin School District. As of the 2020 census the population was 1,015.

== Demographics ==
Historical population
Census	Pop.	Note	%±
2020	1,015		—
U.S. Decennial Census
