= Angelica Creek (Pennsylvania) =

Creek in eastern Pennsylvania, United States

Coordinates: 40°18′33″N 75°55′17″W

Angelica Creek is a 6.4-mile-long (10.3 km) tributary of the Schuylkill River in Berks County, Pennsylvania in the United States.

Angelica Creek joins the Schuylkill River at Kenhorst.

== See also ==
- List of rivers of Pennsylvania
