= Green Hills, Berks County, Pennsylvania =

Unincorporated community in Pennsylvania, US

- Unincorporated community
- Location within Pennsylvania Location within the United States
- Coordinates: 40.257°N 75.912°W
- Country: United States
- State: Pennsylvania
- County: Berks
- Township: Robeson
- Time zone: UTC-5 (Eastern (EST))
  - Summer (DST): UTC-4 (EDT)
- ZIP code: 19540
- Area codes: 610 and 484

Green Hills is an unincorporated community located in Robeson Township in Berks County, Pennsylvania, United States. Green Hills is located along Pennsylvania Route 10 north of Pennsylvania Route 568 at exit 7 of Interstate 176.
