= Pennsylvania State Game Lands Number 52 =

Park in the United States

- Location within Pennsylvania Location within the United States
- Location: Berks County; Lancaster County
- Nearest town: New Morgan; Terre Hill, Pennsylvania, U.S.
- Coordinates: 40°10′45″N 75°57′30″W
- Area: 2,463 acres (997 ha)
- Elevation: 679 feet (207 m)
- Max. elevation: 1,038 feet (316 m)
- Min. elevation: 540 feet (160 m)
- Owner: Pennsylvania Game Commission
- Website: www.pgc.pa.gov/HuntTrap/StateGameLands/Documents/SGL%20Maps/SGL__52.pdf

The Pennsylvania State Game Lands Number 52 are Pennsylvania State Game Lands in Berks and Lancaster Counties, Pennsylvania that provide the public with providing hunting, bird watching, and other activities.

== Geography ==
SGL 52 consists of a two parcels located in the Borough of New Morgan, Brecknock and Caernarvon Townships in Berks County, and in Brecknock Township in Lancaster County. Except for a very small portion of the northeast corner which drains into Hay Creek which is part of the Schuylkill River watershed which flows to the Delaware River, tributaries of the Game Lands are part of the Conestoga River watershed which is part of the Susquehanna River watershed. Nearby communities include the Boroughs of New Morgan and Terre Hill, as well as populated places Alleghenyville, Beckersville, Bowmansville, Briarwood, Brittany Estates, Churchtown, Fivepointville, Goodville, Joanna, Joanna Furnace, Joanna Heights, Kenneys, Knauers, Maple Grove Park, Morgantown, Pennwood Farms, Plowville, and Union Grove. The Pennsylvania Turnpike passes through the southern portion of SGL 52, Interstate 176 and Pennsylvania Route 10 pass just to the east, and Pennsylvania Route 23 passes a couple of miles to the south.

== Statistics ==
SGL 52 was entered into the Geographic Names Information System on 2 August 1979 as identification number 1193459, its elevation is listed as 843 feet (257 m). Elevations range from 600 feet (180 m) to 940 feet (290 m). It consists of 2,545 acres (1,030 ha) in three parcels.

== Biology ==
Hunting and furtaking species include deer (Odocoileus virginianus), Red fox (Vulpes vulpes), ruffed grouse (Bonasa umbellus), mink (Neovison vison), rabbit (Sylvilagus floridanus), Raccoon (Procyon lotor), squirrel (Sciurus carolinensis), and turkey (Meleagris gallopavo). The Game Lands is also managed to benefit non-game species of concern such as Scarlet tanager (Piranga olivacea), Brown thrasher (Toxostoma rufum), Wood thrush (Hylocichla mustelina), and Blue-winged warbler (Vermivora cyanoptera).

== See also ==
- Pennsylvania State Game Lands
- Pennsylvania State Game Lands Number 43, also located in Berks County
- Pennsylvania State Game Lands Number 80, also located in Berks County
- Pennsylvania State Game Lands Number 106, also located in Berks County
- Pennsylvania State Game Lands Number 110, also located in Berks County
- Pennsylvania State Game Lands Number 182, also located in Berks County
- Pennsylvania State Game Lands Number 274, also located in Berks County
- Pennsylvania State Game Lands Number 280, also located in Berks County
- Pennsylvania State Game Lands Number 315, also located in Berks County
- Pennsylvania State Game Lands Number 324, also located in Berks County
