= Pennsylvania State Game Lands Number 315 =

Hunting grounds in the United States

- Location within Pennsylvania Location within the United States
- Location: Berks County
- Nearest town: Bally
- Coordinates: 40°26′24″N 75°41′10″W; 40°24′29″N 75°36′47″W; 40°25′39″N 75°36′14″W; 40°25′35″N 75°46′10″W
- Area: 324 acres (131 ha)
- Elevation: 900 feet (270 m)
- Max. elevation: 1,000 feet (300 m)
- Min. elevation: 520 feet (160 m)
- Owner: Pennsylvania Game Commission
- Website: www.pgc.pa.gov/HuntTrap/StateGameLands/Documents/SGL%20Maps/SGL__315.pdf

The Pennsylvania State Game Lands Number 315 are Pennsylvania State Game Lands in Berks County in Pennsylvania in the United States providing hunting, bird watching, and other activities.

== Geography ==
SGL 315 consists of four parcels well separated, located in District, Hereford, Rockland, and Washington Townships in Berks County. The two parcels located farthest apart are separated by approximately 11 miles (18 km). The western parcel is drained by Bieber Creek, the northern parcel is drained by Pine Creek, both tributaries of Manatawny Creek. The remaining two parcels, to the east, are drained by the west branch Perkiomen Creek. All are part of the Schuylkill River watershed, part of the Delaware River watershed. Elevations range from 520 feet (160 m) to about 1,000 feet (300 m). Other nearby protected areas include Pennsylvania State Game Lands Number 182 and Green Lane Park. Nearby communities include the borough of Bally, and populated places Boyers Junction, Dale, Dryville, Five Points, Fredericksville, Harlem, Henningsville, Huffs Church, Landis Store, Lobachsville, Lyons, New Jerusalem, Oley Furnace, Pilgerts, Pikeville, Pine Waters, Rittenhouse Gap, Sally Ann, Seisholtzville and Stony Point. Pennsylvania Route 12 passes to the north of the western parcel of SGL 315, Pennsylvania Route 100 passes to the southeast of the two eastern parcels.

== Statistics ==
SGL 315 consists of four well separated parcels. It consists of 324 acres (131 ha) in one parcel, elevations range from 520 feet (160 m) to 1,000 feet (300 m).

== See also ==
- Pennsylvania State Game Lands
- Pennsylvania State Game Lands Number 43, also located in Berks County
- Pennsylvania State Game Lands Number 52, also located in Berks and Lancaster Counties
- Pennsylvania State Game Lands Number 80, also located in Berks County
- Pennsylvania State Game Lands Number 106, also located in Berks County
- Pennsylvania State Game Lands Number 110, also located in Berks County
- Pennsylvania State Game Lands Number 182, also located in Berks County
- Pennsylvania State Game Lands Number 274, also located in Berks County
- Pennsylvania State Game Lands Number 280, also located in Berks County
- Pennsylvania State Game Lands Number 324, also located in Berks County
