= Brecknock Township, Pennsylvania =

Brecknock Township is the name of some places in the U.S. state of Pennsylvania:

- Brecknock Township, Berks County, Pennsylvania
- Brecknock Township, Lancaster County, Pennsylvania
