= Pennsylvania State Game Lands Number 80 =

Park in the United States

- Location within Pennsylvania Location within the United States
- Location: Berks County; Lebanon County; Schuylkill County, U.S.
- Nearest town: New Morgan; Terre Hill
- Coordinates: 40°31′48″N 76°14′30″W
- Area: 11,252 acres (4,554 ha)
- Elevation: 768 feet (234 m)
- Max. elevation: 1,038 feet (316 m)
- Min. elevation: 540 feet (160 m)
- Owner: Pennsylvania Game Commission
- Website: www.pgc.pa.gov/HuntTrap/StateGameLands/Documents/SGL%20Maps/SGL__80.pdf

The Pennsylvania State Game Lands Number 80 are Pennsylvania State Game Lands in Berks, Lebanon and Schuylkill Counties in Pennsylvania, providing hunting, bird watching, and other activities.

== Geography ==
SGL 80 consists of a three parcels located in Bethel Township in Berks County, in Bethel and Union Townships in Lebanon County, and in Pine Grove, Washington and Wayne Townships in Schuylkill County. Portions of Game Lands Number 80 straddles Blue Mountain; tributaries on both sides drain to Swatara Creek, part of the Susquehanna River watershed. Nearby communities include the boroughs of Aubrun, Pine Grove, and populated places Bethel. Brookside, De Turksville, Exmoor, Fort Indiantown Gap, Friedensburg, Marstown, Meckville, Moyers, Paradise, Pleasant Valley, Ravine, Roeders, Roedersville, Round Head, Schubert, Stanhope, Stonemont, Strausstown, and Summit Station. Interstate 81 passes to the north of the Game Lands and cuts through the western portion isolating a small portion from the large center portion. Interstate 78 and U.S. Route 22 pass along to the south of the Game Lands. Pennsylvania Route 501 passes through the western portion of SGL 80. the Appalachian Trail passes through part of SGL 80.

== History ==
Historically, the land was used to supply charcoal to the Camp Strauss iron works. The owner at the time timbered the area in 1917 and 1918. Lumber was hauled out by narrow gauge railroad to Innwood and Meckville. Water was provided to the ironworks by a dam at Camp Strauss. More than 1,100 acres (450 ha) burned in 1940.

== Statistics ==
It consists of 2,545 acres (1,030 ha) in three parcels, elevations range from 700 feet (210 m) to 1,700 feet (520 m).

== Biology ==
State Game Lands Number 80 is almost completely forested, containing four forest types: Dry Oak-Mixed Hardwood, Red Oak-Mixed Hardwood, Tuliptree-beech-maple, and Dry Oak-Heath.

== See also ==
- Pennsylvania State Game Lands
- Pennsylvania State Game Lands Number 43, also located in Berks County
- Pennsylvania State Game Lands Number 52, also located in Berks County
- Pennsylvania State Game Lands Number 106, also located in Berks County
- Pennsylvania State Game Lands Number 110, also located in Berks County
- Pennsylvania State Game Lands Number 182, also located in Berks County
- Pennsylvania State Game Lands Number 274, also located in Berks County
- Pennsylvania State Game Lands Number 280, also located in Berks County
- Pennsylvania State Game Lands Number 315, also located in Berks County
- Pennsylvania State Game Lands Number 324, also located in Berks County
- Pennsylvania State Game Lands Number 329, also located in Schuylkill County
