= Fivepointville, Pennsylvania =

Unincorporated community in Pennsylvania, US

- Census-designated place
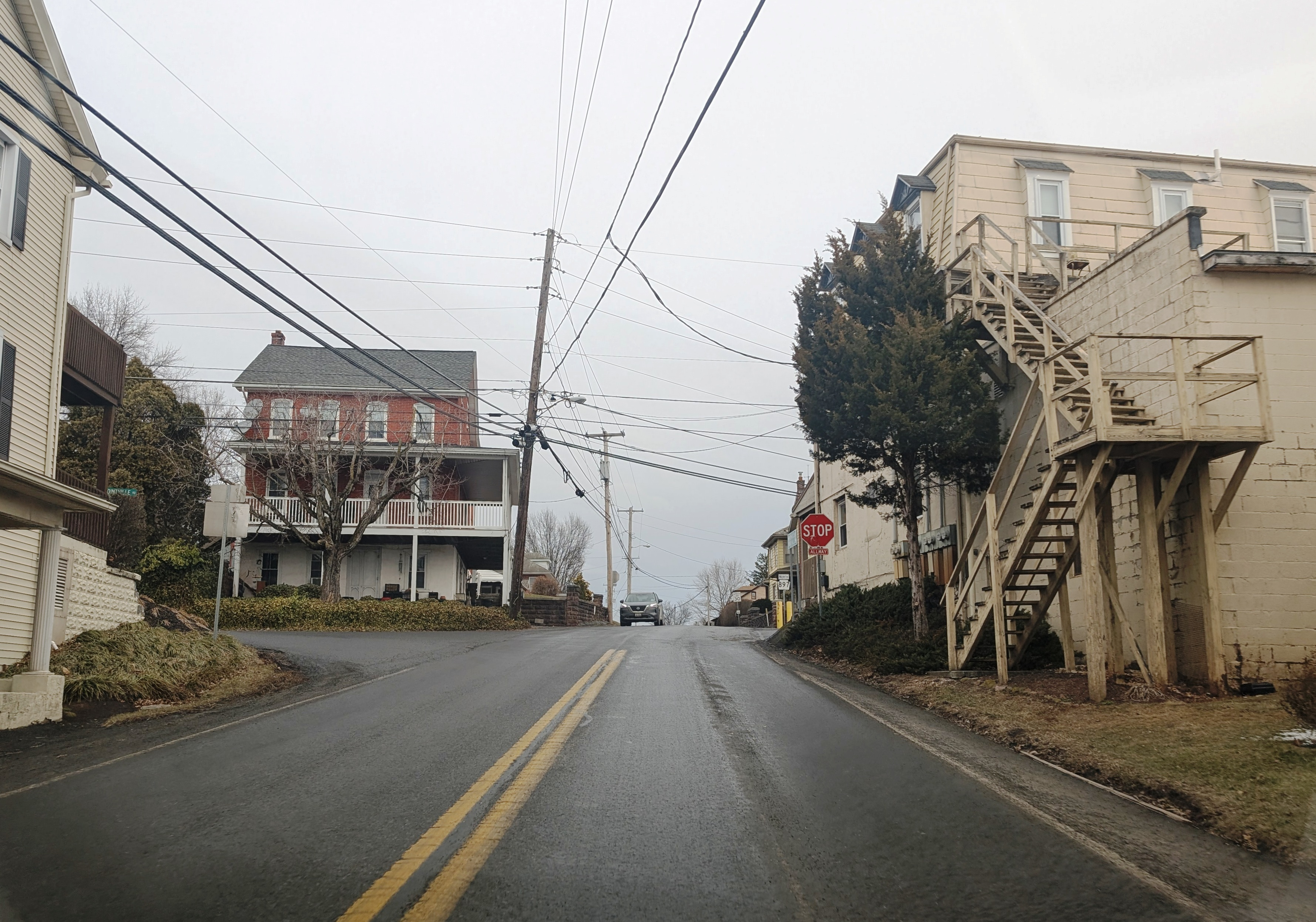
- PA 897 northbound in the center of the village

- Location in Pennsylvania Location in the United States
- Coordinates: 40°10′58″N 76°03′04″W
- Country: United States
- State: Pennsylvania
- County: Lancaster
- Township: Brecknock

Area
  - Total: 1.26 sq mi (3.27 km^{2})
  - Land: 1.24 sq mi (3.20 km^{2})
  - Water: 0.027 sq mi (0.07 km^{2})
- Elevation: 464 ft (141 m)

Population (2020)
  - Total: 1,090
  - Density: 883.3/sq mi (341.06/km^{2})
- Time zone: UTC-5 (Eastern (EST))
  - Summer (DST): UTC-4 (EDT)
- FIPS code: 42-26232
- GNIS feature ID: 1203594

Fivepointville (Pennsylvania German: Druckne) is an unincorporated community and census-designated place (CDP) in Brecknock Township, Lancaster County, Pennsylvania, United States. As of the 2010 census, the population was 1,156. The town is named for its position at an intersection of five separate roads.

== Geography ==
Fivepointville is in northeastern Lancaster County, in the southwest part of Brecknock Township. It is bordered to the south by Muddy Creek, which is also the border with East Earl Township. The five roads meeting at the center of town are Dry Tavern Road (north and south), Fivepointville Road (west), West Maple Grove Road (northeast), and Pleasant Valley Road (east-southeast). Pennsylvania Route 897 follows Dry Tavern Road, leading north 4 miles (6 km) to Swartzville and south 2 miles (3 km) to Terre Hill. Ephrata is 8 miles (13 km) to the west, and Lancaster, the county seat, is 19 miles (31 km) to the southwest.

According to the U.S. Census Bureau, the Fivepointville CDP has a total area of 1.3 square miles (3.3 km^{2}), of which 0.03 square miles (0.07 km^{2}), or 2.16%, are water. The community is in the Muddy Creek watershed, which flows west to the Conestoga River and eventually the Susquehanna.

The main offices of Weaver's Store Inc. are located in Fivepointville. Since 1959, Greenview Bible Camp has operated a youth summer camp program here.

== Demographics ==
Historical population
Census	Pop.	Note	%±
2020	1,090		—
U.S. Decennial Census
