= District Township, Pennsylvania =

Township in Pennsylvania, US

District Township
- Township
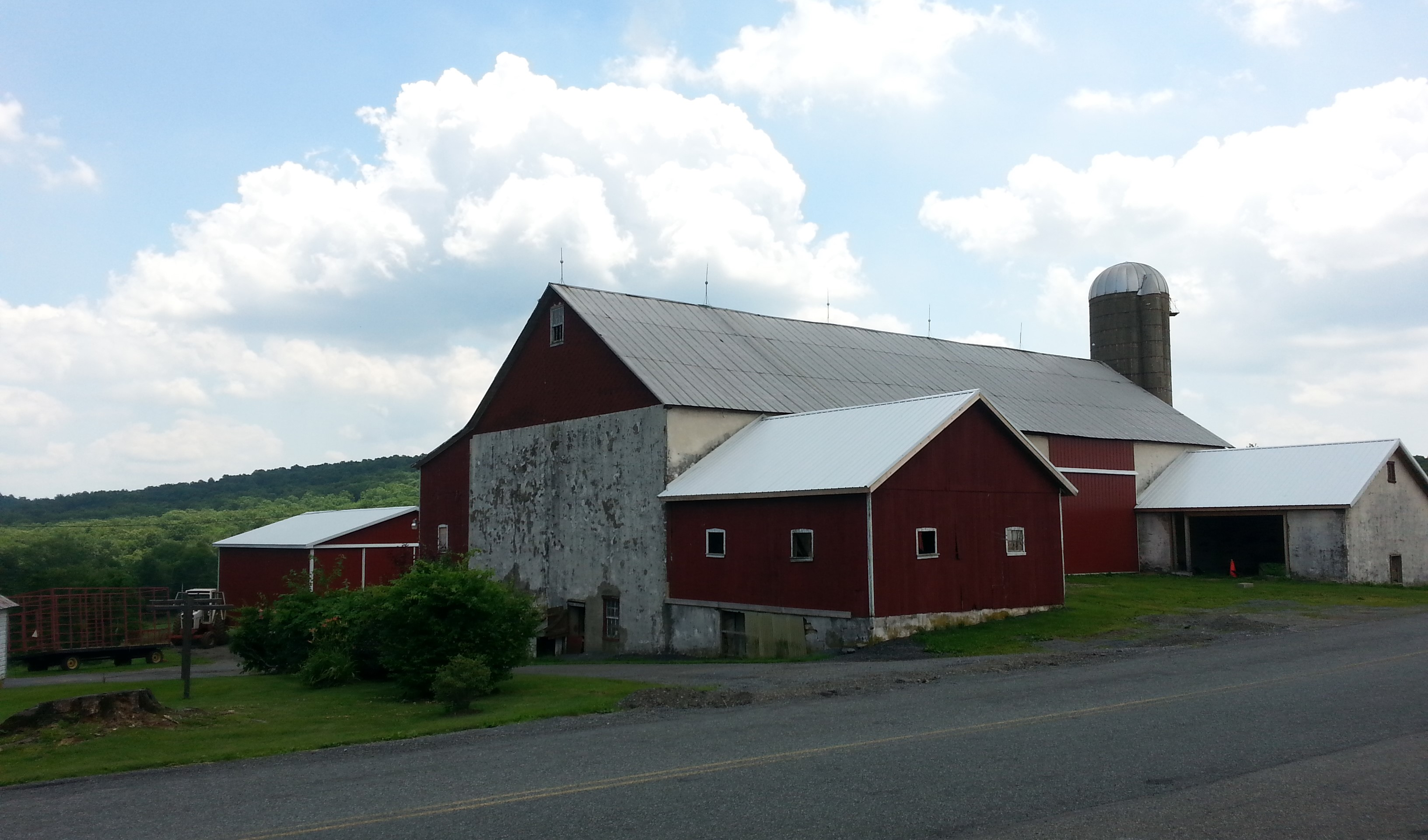
- Farm in Landis Store, District Township

- Seal

- Location of District Township in Berks County, Pennsylvania

- Location of District Township in Pennsylvania District Township (the United States)
- Coordinates: 40°25′57″N 75°39′44″W
- Country: United States
- State: Pennsylvania
- County: Berks

Area
  - Total: 11.61 sq mi (30.06 km^{2})
  - Land: 11.58 sq mi (29.99 km^{2})
  - Water: 0.027 sq mi (0.07 km^{2})
- Elevation: 938 ft (286 m)

Population (2020)
  - Total: 1,381 ▲
  - Estimate (2021): 1,378
  - Density: 121.2/sq mi (46.81/km^{2})
- Time zone: UTC-5 (EST)
  - Summer (DST): UTC-4 (EDT)
- ZIP Codes: 18011, 18062, 19504, 19512, 19539
- Area code: 610
- FIPS code: 42-011-19312
- Website: www.districttownship.org

District Township is a township in eastern Berks County, Pennsylvania, United States. The population was 1,381 at the 2020 census.

District Township was founded in 1759.

== Geography ==
According to the U.S. Census Bureau, the township has a total area of 11.6 square miles (30 km^{2}), all of it land. It is drained by the Schuylkill River via the Manatawny Creek and the Perkiomen Creek via the West Branch Perkiomen Creek, which starts in the township. District Township is located in the Oley Hills, and its elevations range from over 600 feet to over 1,100 feet. Its villages are Fredericksville and Landis Store.

District Township has a humid continental climate (Dfa/Dfb) and is in hardiness zone 6b except for some higher areas that are 6a. The average monthly temperature in Landis Store ranges from 27.2 °F in January to 71.6 °F in July. The average annual absolute minimum temperature in Landis Store is -4.2 °F.

=== Adjacent townships ===
- Longswamp Township (north)
- Hereford Township (east)
- Washington Township (southeast)
- Pike Township (south)
- Rockland Township (west)

== Demographics ==
Historical population
Census	Pop.	Note	%±
1980	1,094		—
1990	1,211		10.7%
2000	1,449		19.7%
2010	1,337		−7.7%
2020	1,381		3.3%
2021 (est.)	1,378		−0.2%
Source: US Census Bureau

As of the 2000 census, there were 1,449 people, 522 households, and 416 families living in the township. The population density was 124.4 inhabitants per square mile (48.0/km^{2}). There were 548 housing units at an average density of 47.0 per square mile (18.1/km^{2}). The racial makeup of the township was 99.03% White, 0.41% African American, 0.21% Native American, 0.07% Asian, 0.14% from other races, and 0.14% from two or more races. Hispanic or Latino of any race were 0.41%.

There were 522 households, 36.4% had children under the age of 18 living with them, 70.9% were married couples living together, 5.6% had a female householder with no husband present, and 20.3% were non-families. 16.5% of households were made up of individuals, and 6.9% were one person aged 65 or older. The average household size was 2.78 and the average family size was 3.12.

The age distribution was 26.6% under the age of 18, 6.2% from 18 to 24, 29.6% from 25 to 44, 28.8% from 45 to 64, and 8.8% 65 or older. The median age was 38 years. For every 100 females, there were 101.8 males. For every 100 females age 18 and over, there were 100.4 males.

The median household income was $53,233 and the median family income was $58,158. Males had a median income of $42,404 versus $30,556 for females. The per capita income for the township was $21,663. About 4.1% of families and 3.5% of the population were below the poverty line, including 3.2% of those under age 18 and 6.7% of those age 65 or over.

== Transportation ==
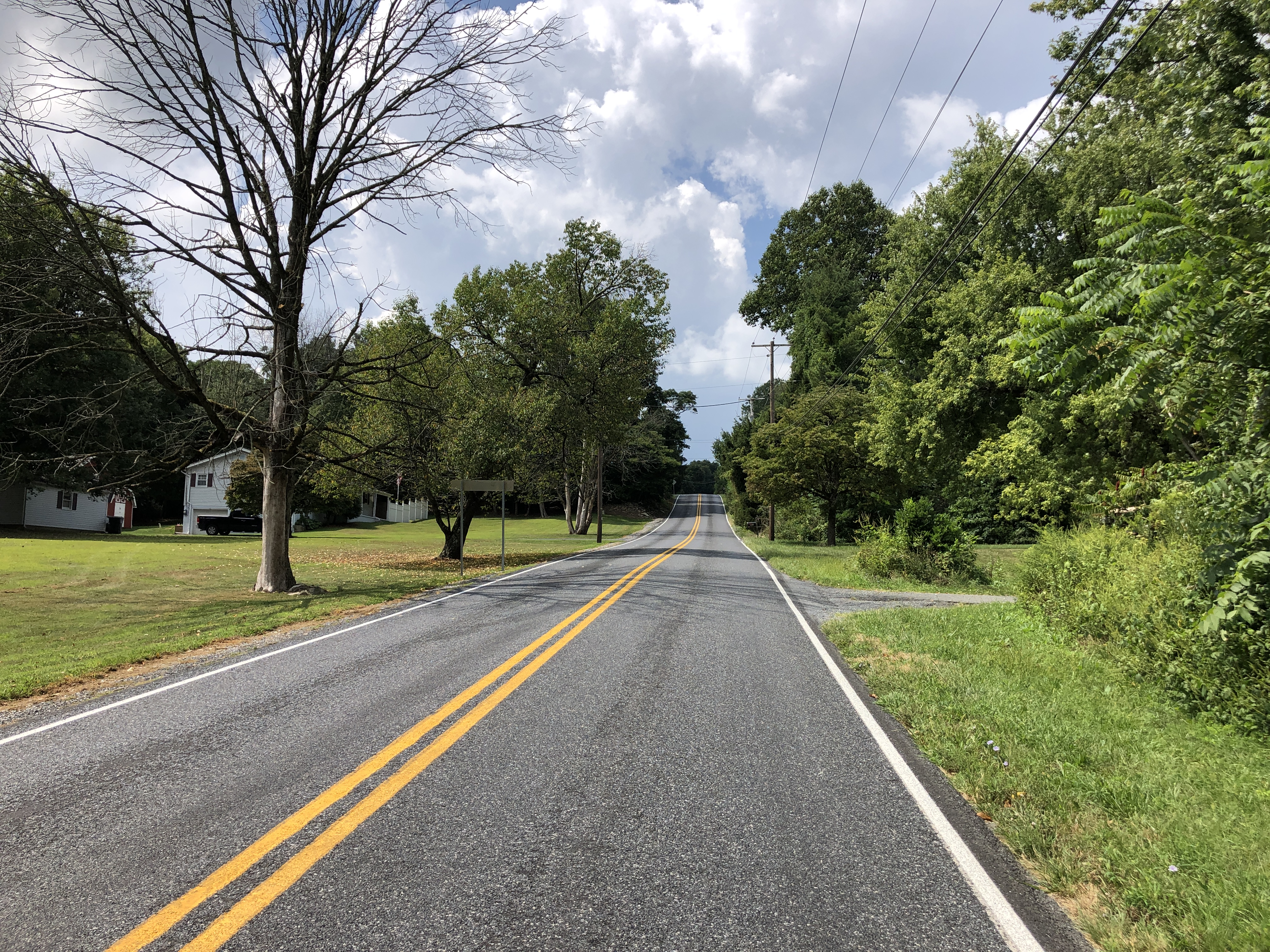
Huffs Church Road in District Township

As of 2019, there were 30.11 miles (48.46 km) of public roads in District Township, of which 17.53 miles (28.21 km) were maintained by the Pennsylvania Department of Transportation (PennDOT) and 12.58 miles (20.25 km) were maintained by the township.

No numbered highways pass through District Township. The main roads in District Township include Bitting Road, Conrad Road, Forgedale Road/Baldy Hill Road, Huffs Church Road, Landis Store Road, Long Lane, and Oysterdale Road.

== Government and politics ==
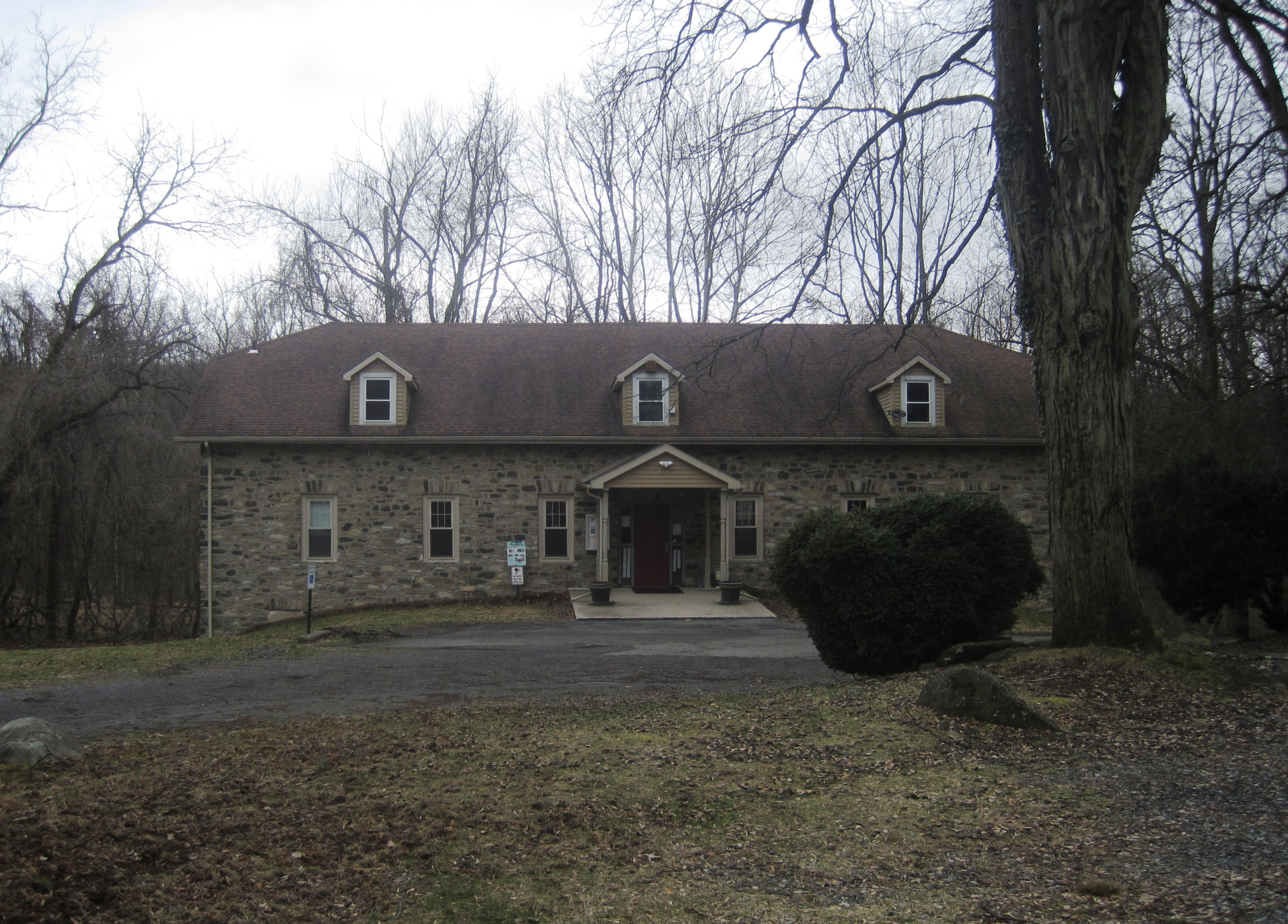
District Municipal Building

=== Legislators ===
- State Representative David Maloney Sr., Republican, 130th district
- State Senator Tracy Pennycuick, Republican, 24th district
- US Representative Madeleine Dean, Democrat, 4th district

== Recreation ==
A parcel of the Pennsylvania State Game Lands Number 315 is located in the northwestern portion of the township. Gordon Park is located near the southern corner of the township.
