= Spring Grove Forge Mansion =

Historic house in Pennsylvania, United States

- U.S. National Register of Historic Places
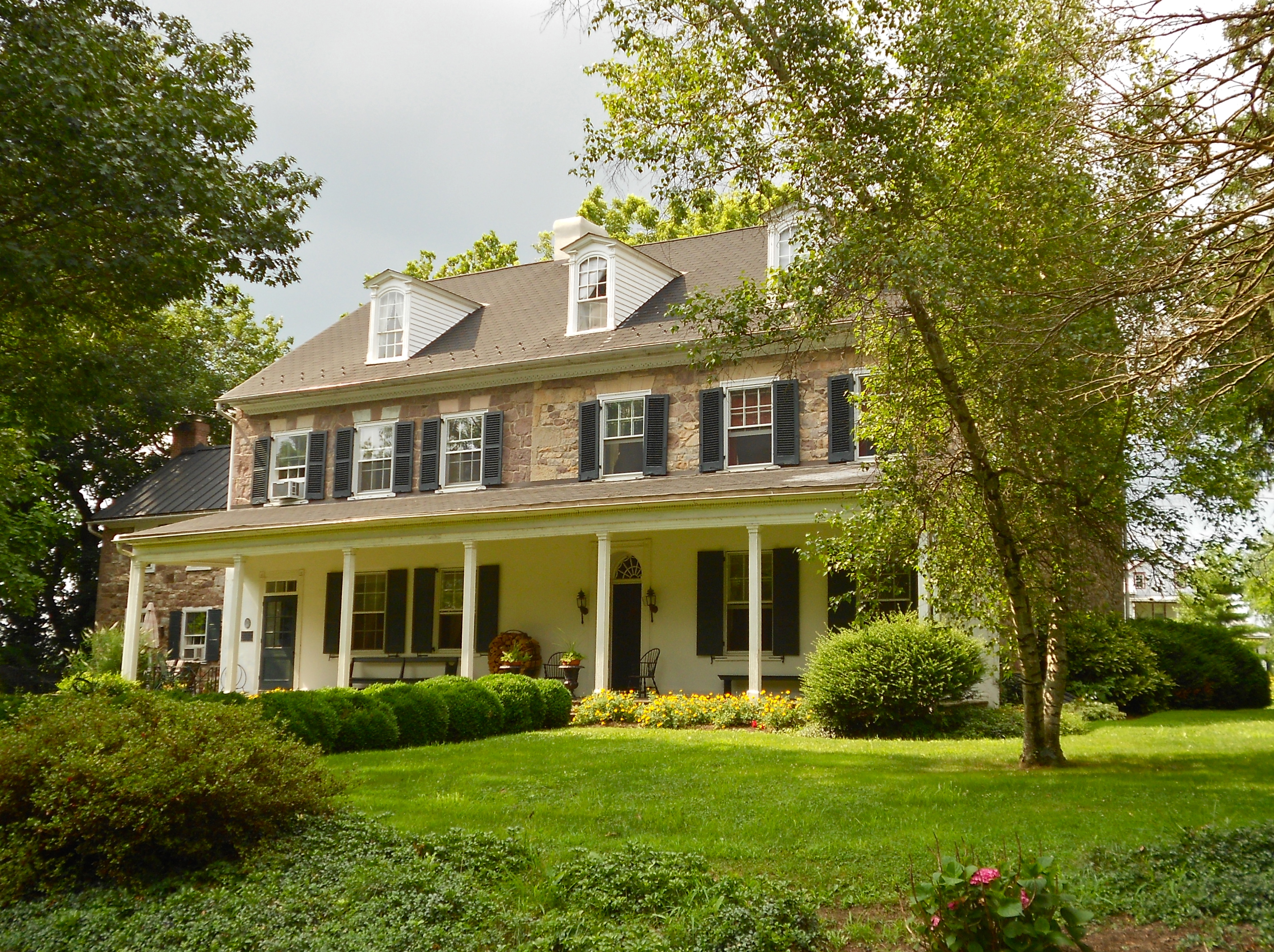
- The mansion in 2013

- Location within Pennsylvania Location within the United States
- Location: Spring Grove Rd., East Earl Township, Pennsylvania
- Coordinates: 40°8′41″N 76°1′17″W
- Area: 1.9 acres (0.77 ha)
- Built: pre-1789, c. 1830
- NRHP reference No.: 84003447
- Added to NRHP: July 11, 1984

Spring Grove Forge Mansion is a historic home located at East Earl Township, Lancaster County, Pennsylvania. The mansion is a large, two-story, L-shaped, stuccoed stone building. The main block is six bays wide and features a full-width gouge carved piazza. The kitchen wing is the oldest section and dates before 1764.

It was listed on the National Register of Historic Places in 1984.
