= John B. Good House =

Historic house in Pennsylvania, United States

- U.S. National Register of Historic Places
- Location within Pennsylvania Location within the United States
- Location: PA 625, Bowmansville, Brecknock Township, Pennsylvania
- Coordinates: 40°11′48″N 76°1′3″W
- Area: 1.2 acres (0.49 ha)
- Built: 1847
- Built by: Good, John B.
- NRHP reference No.: 80003507
- Added to NRHP: February 8, 1980

John B. Good House is a historic home located at Bowmansville, Brecknock Township in Lancaster County, Pennsylvania. It was built in 1847, and is a 2 1/2-story, sandstone building with a gable roof and full-width front porch. The house measures 36 feet by 30 feet. The property includes the remains of demolished outbuildings including a summer kitchen, barn, large drive-in scales, and corn crib.

It was listed on the National Register of Historic Places in 1980.
