= Pennsylvania State Game Lands Number 43 =

Park in the United States

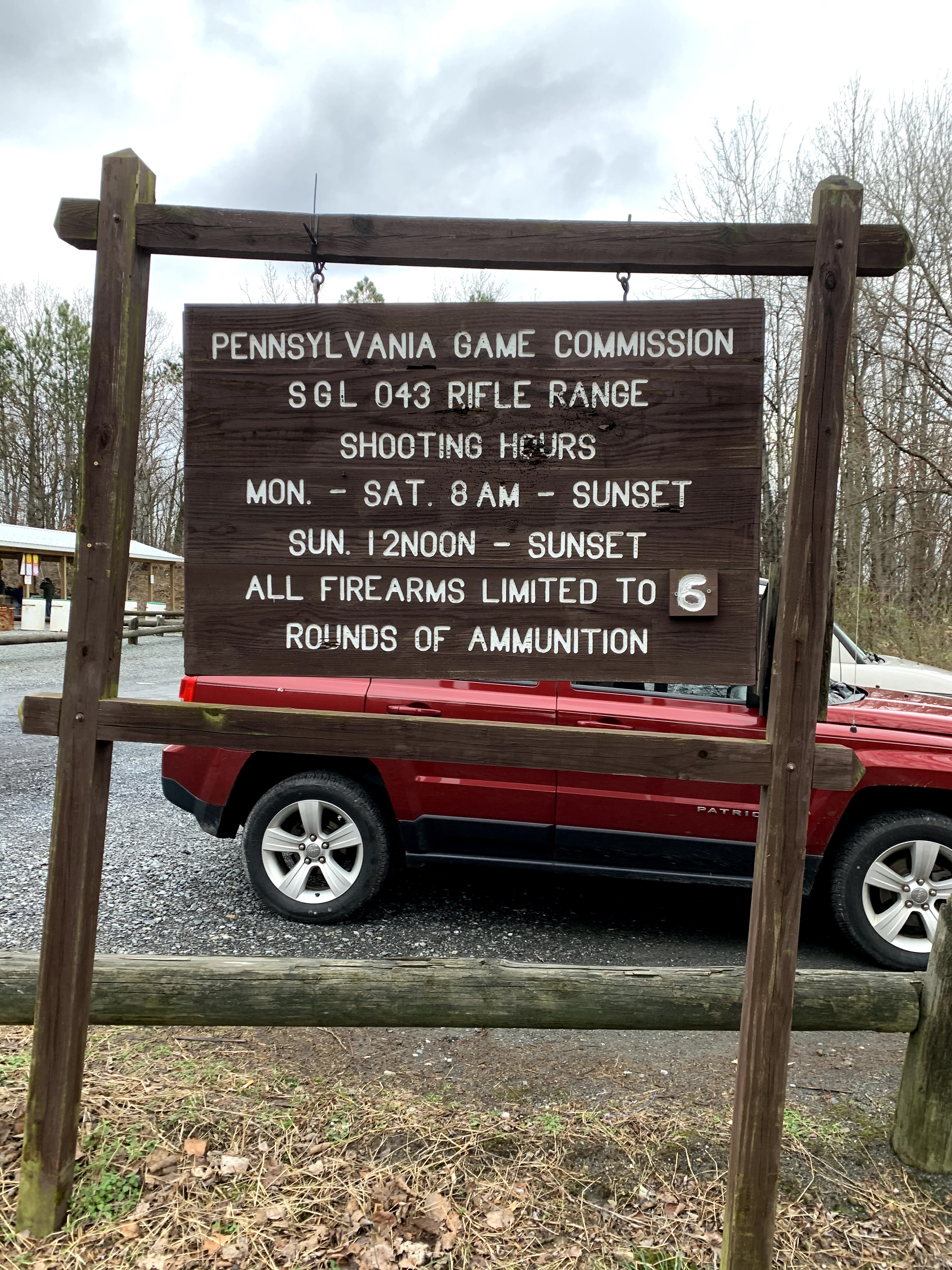
- Sign at the rifle range located within the Game Lands

- Location within Pennsylvania Location within the United States
- Location: Berks County; Chester County
- Nearest town: Elverson
- Coordinates: 40°10′19″N 75°48′30″W; 40°10′40″N 75°46′25″W; 40°10′51″N 75°44′28″W
- Area: 2,545 acres (1,030 ha)
- Elevation: 843 feet (257 m)
- Max. elevation: 967 feet (295 m)
- Min. elevation: 430 feet (130 m)
- Owner: Pennsylvania Game Commission
- Website: www.pgc.pa.gov/HuntTrap/StateGameLands/Documents/SGL%20Maps/SGL__43.pdf

The Pennsylvania State Game Lands Number 43 are Pennsylvania State Game Lands in Berks and Chester Counties in Pennsylvania in the United States providing hunting, bird watching, and other activities. It is the only State Game Lands located in Chester County.

== Geography ==
SGL 43 consists of a three parcels located in Caernarvon, Robeson and Union Townships in Berks County and in Warwick and West Nantmeal Townships in Chester County. Tributaries of French Creek drains the Game Lands, part of the Schuylkill River watershed. Nearby communities include the Borough of Elverson and populated places Conestoga, Joanna, Kenneys, Morgantown, and Pine Swamp. Pennsylvania Route 23 passes immediately to the south of all three parcels, the Interstate 76 section of the Pennsylvania Turnpike passes a mile or so to the south connecting with Interstate 176, Route 23, and Pennsylvania Route 10 at Morgantown about 4 miles west of SGL 43.

== Statistics ==
State Game Lands Number 43 was entered into the Geographic Names Information System on 2 August 1979 as identification number 1188515, its elevation is listed as 843 feet (257 m). Elevations range from 600 feet (180 m) to 940 feet (290 m). It consists of 2,545 acres (1,030 ha) in three parcels.

== Biology ==
Hunting and furtaking species include deer (Odocoileus virginianus), ruffed grouse (Bonasa umbellus), rabbit (Sylvilagus floridanus), and squirrel (Sciurus carolinensis).

== See also ==
- Pennsylvania State Game Lands
- Pennsylvania State Game Lands Number 52, also located in Berks County
- Pennsylvania State Game Lands Number 80, also located in Berks County
- Pennsylvania State Game Lands Number 106, also located in Berks County
- Pennsylvania State Game Lands Number 110, also located in Berks County
- Pennsylvania State Game Lands Number 182, also located in Berks County
- Pennsylvania State Game Lands Number 274, also located in Berks County
- Pennsylvania State Game Lands Number 280, also located in Berks County
- Pennsylvania State Game Lands Number 315, also located in Berks County
- Pennsylvania State Game Lands Number 324, also located in Berks County
