= Bowmansville Roller Mill =

Historic district in Pennsylvania, United States

- U.S. National Register of Historic Places
- U.S. Historic district
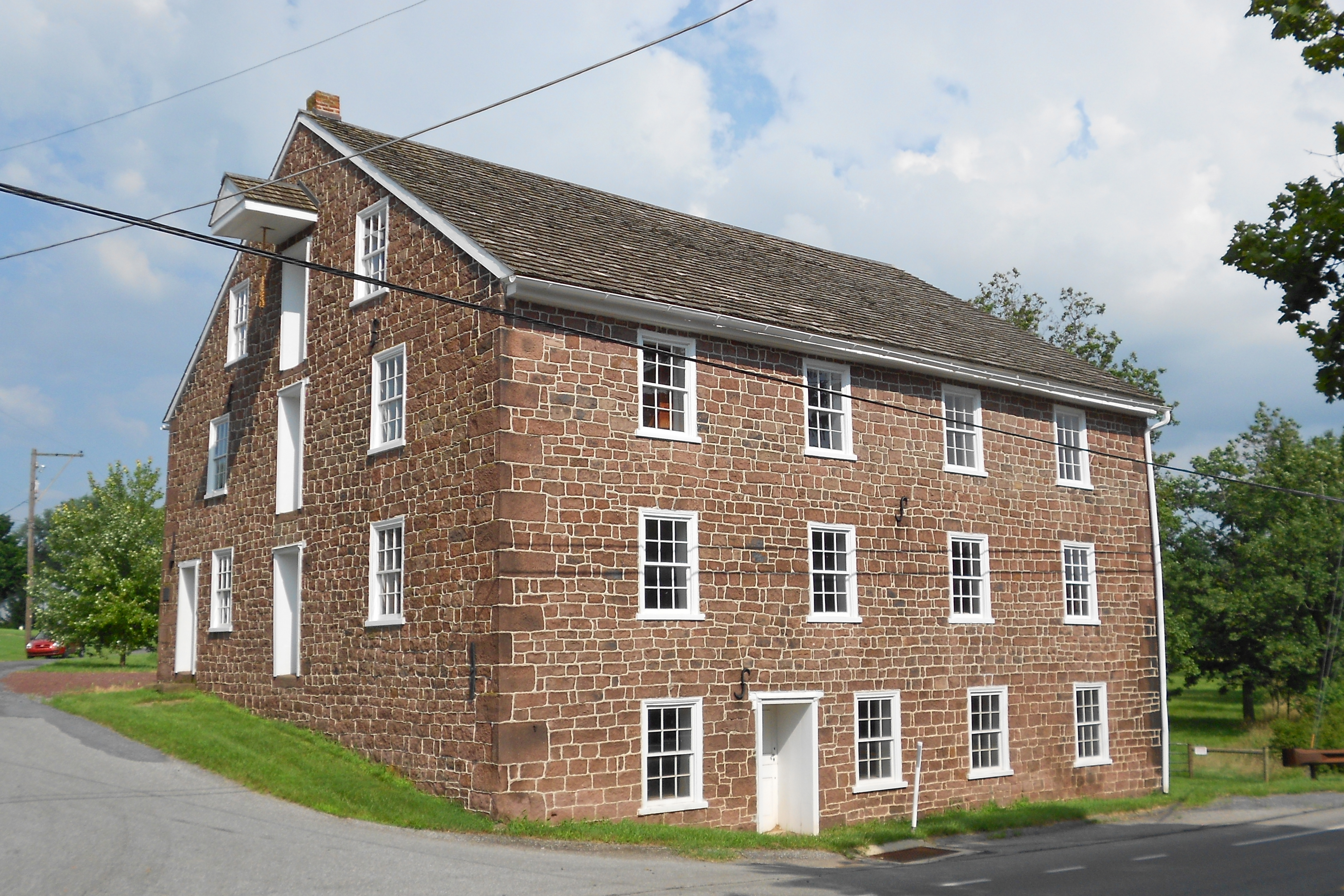
- The mill building in 2013

- Location within Pennsylvania Location within the United States
- Location: Jct. of PA 625 and Von Nieda St., Bowmansville, Brecknock Township, Pennsylvania
- Coordinates: 40°11′24″N 76°00′43″W
- Area: 14.3 acres (5.8 ha)
- Built: 1850
- Built by: Von Nieda, Henry; Von Nieda, John Adam
- NRHP reference No.: 89001821
- Added to NRHP: January 19, 1990

Bowmansville Roller Mill, also known as the Von Nieda Mill, is a historic roller mill and national historic district located at Bowmansville, Brecknock Township in Lancaster County, Pennsylvania. The district encompasses two contributing buildings and one contributing structure. The grist / roller mill was built in 1850, and is a 3 1/2-story, rectangular brownstone building measuring 45 feet by 50 feet, 5 inches. The property includes a two-story, brownstone and frame sawmill, and a headrace and tailrace. The mills closed about 1945.

It was listed on the National Register of Historic Places in 1990.
