= Brecknock Township, Berks County, Pennsylvania =

Township in Pennsylvania, US

- Township
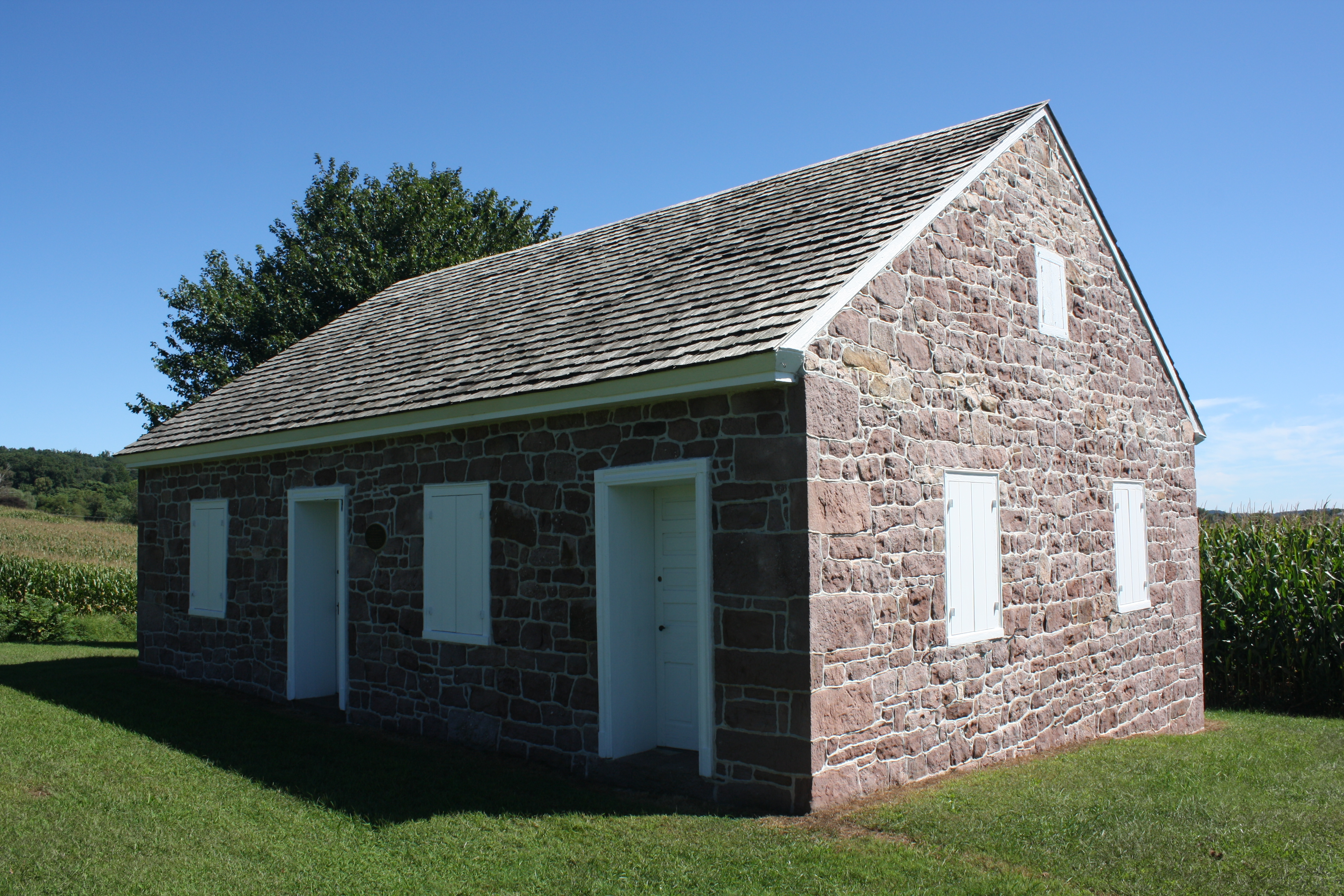
- Alleghany Mennonite Meetinghouse in Brecknock Township, Pennsylvania, built 1855

- Seal

- Location of Brecknock Township in Pennsylvania Brecknock Township (the United States)
- Coordinates: 40°15′15″N 76°00′29″W
- Country: United States
- State: Pennsylvania
- County: Berks

Area
  - Total: 17.76 sq mi (45.99 km^{2})
  - Land: 17.66 sq mi (45.75 km^{2})
  - Water: 0.093 sq mi (0.24 km^{2})
- Elevation: 791 ft (241 m)

Population (2020)
  - Total: 4,618 ▼
  - Estimate (2021): 4,606
  - Density: 260/sq mi (101/km^{2})
- Time zone: UTC-5 (EST)
  - Summer (DST): UTC-4 (EDT)
- Area codes: 610, 717
- FIPS code: 42-011-08344
- Website: www.brecknockberks.com

Brecknock Township is a township in Berks County, Pennsylvania, United States. The population was 4,618 at the 2020 census.

== History ==
The township was named by Welsh settlers, after Brecknock, in Wales.

Alleghany Mennonite Meetinghouse in the township was listed on the National Register of Historic Places in 2009.

== Geography ==
According to the U.S. Census Bureau, the township has a total area of 17.8 square miles (46 km^{2}), all land. It contains the census-designated place of Alleghenyville and part of Gouglersville.

Adjacent municipalities

- Spring Township, Berks County (northwest)
- Cumru Township, Berks County (north)
- Robeson Township, Berks County (east)
- Caernarvon Township, Berks County (southeast)
- Brecknock Township, Lancaster County (southwest)

== Recreation ==
Portions of the Pennsylvania State Game Lands Number 52 are located in the township.

== Demographics ==
Historical population
Census	Pop.	Note	%±
1980	2,641		—
1990	3,770		42.7%
2000	4,459		18.3%
2010	4,585		2.8%
2020	4,618		0.7%
2021 (est.)	4,606		−0.3%
Source: US Census Bureau

As of the 2000 census, there were 4,459 people, 1,558 households, and 1,282 families living in the township. The population density was 250.0 inhabitants per square mile (96.5/km^{2}). There were 1,611 housing units at an average density of 90.3 per square mile (34.9/km^{2}). The racial makeup of the township was 97.85% White, 0.61% African American, 0.13% Native American, 0.22% Asian, 0.25% from other races, and 0.94% from two or more races. Hispanic or Latino of any race were 0.92% of the population.

There were 1,558 households, out of which 40.2% had children under the age of 18 living with them, 74.8% were married couples living together, 4.5% had a female householder with no husband present, and 17.7% were non-families. 13.2% of all households were made up of individuals, and 4.9% had someone living alone who was 65 years of age or older. The average household size was 2.86 and the average family size was 3.17.

In the township, the population was spread out, with 27.4% under the age of 18, 6.1% from 18 to 24, 30.5% from 25 to 44, 26.8% from 45 to 64, and 9.2% who were 65 years of age or older. The median age was 39 years. For every 100 females there were 103.3 males. For every 100 females age 18 and over, there were 100.4 males.

The median income for a household in the township was $65,903, and the median income for a family was $79,143. Males had a median income of $46,495 versus $27,307 for females. The per capita income for the township was $42,712. About 2.0% of families and 2.7% of the population were below the poverty line, including 2.5% of those under age 18 and 7.6% of those age 65 or over.

== Transportation ==
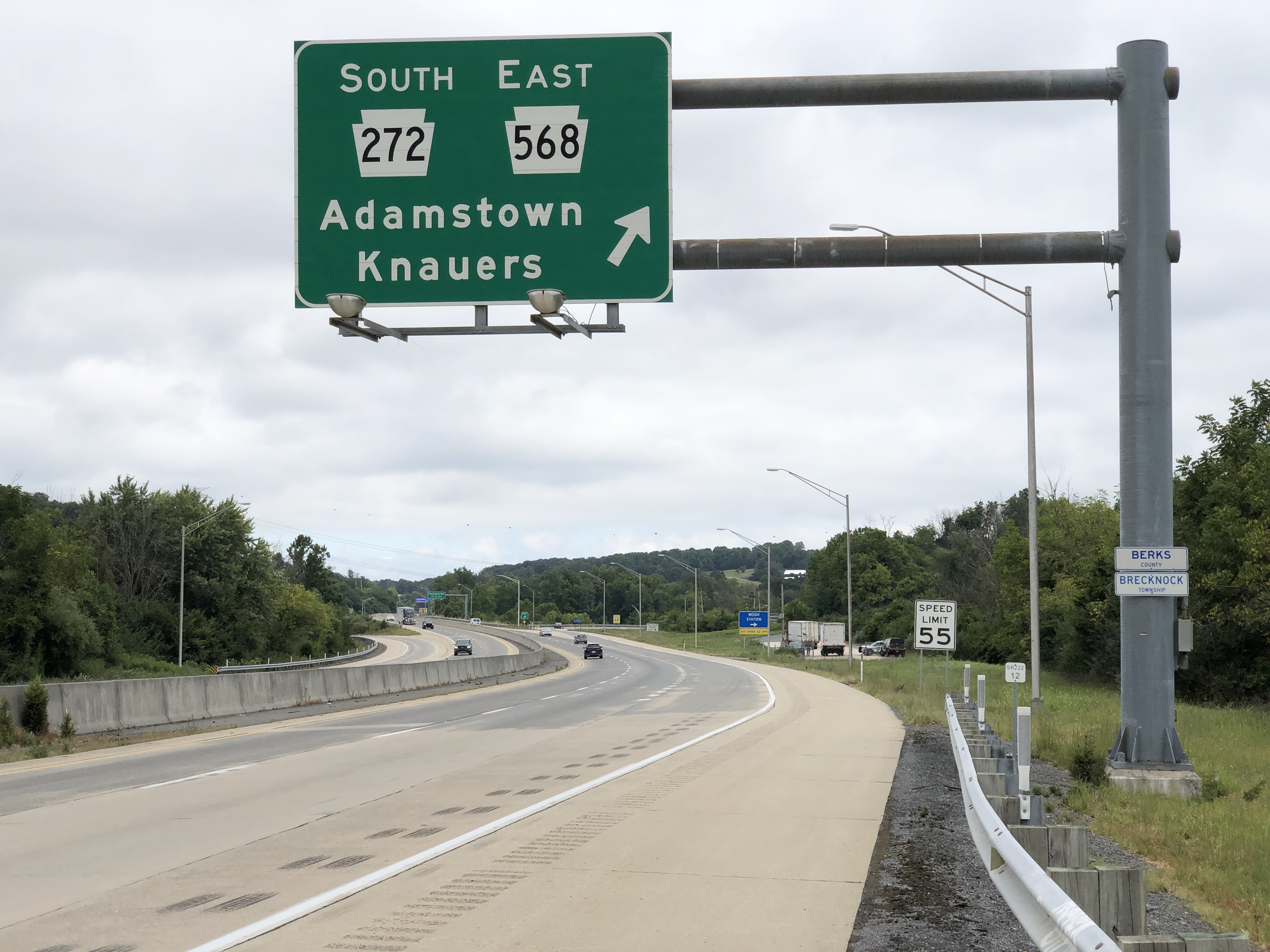
US 222 northbound at PA 272/PA 568 in Brecknock Township

As of 2017, there were 57.44 miles (92.44 km) of public roads in Brecknock Township, of which 18.81 miles (30.27 km) were maintained by the Pennsylvania Department of Transportation (PennDOT) and 38.63 miles (62.17 km) were maintained by the township.

U.S. Route 222 is the most prominent highway serving Brecknock Township. It follows a north–south alignment through the northwestern corner of the township. Pennsylvania Route 568 follows Alleghenyville Road east from US 222 across the northern portion of the township. Pennsylvania Route 625 follows New Holland Road along a northeast–southwest alignment across the northwestern portion of the township. Finally, Pennsylvania Route 272 briefly enters the northwestern corner of the township before ending at US 222/PA 568.
