= Pennsylvania State Game Lands Number 324 =

Park in the United States

- Location within Pennsylvania Location within the United States
- Location: Berks County
- Nearest city: Reading
- Coordinates: 40°18′22″N 75°55′16″W
- Area: 4.75 acres (1.92 ha)
- Elevation: 187 feet (57 m)
- Owner: Pennsylvania Game Commission
- Website: www.pgc.pa.gov/HuntTrap/StateGameLands/Documents/SGL%20Maps/SGL__324.pdf

The Pennsylvania State Game Lands Number 324 are Pennsylvania State Game Lands located in Berks County, Pennsylvania, in the United States providing opportunities for hunting, bird watching, and other activities.

== Geography ==
Game Lands Number 324 is an island in the Schuylkill River, situated just south of the City of Reading and part of Cumru Township. Access is only by boat or by wading when the water is low. Nearby communities include the boroughs of Kenhorst, Shillington, and populated places Birdland, Brookline, Clover Park, Crestwood, Deerfield Village, Gibraltar, Grill, Klapperthall Junction, Laurel Springs, Mifflin Park, Millmont, Neversink, Oakbrook, Oakbrook Terrace, Overbrook, Pheasant Run, Reiffton, Ridgewood, Seyfert, Valley Ridge Farms, Woodgate, and Wyomissing Park.

The junction of Interstate 176 and U.S. Route 422 is located about a mile to the east of SGL 324. Pennsylvania Route 10, Pennsylvania Route 625 and Pennsylvania Route 724 pass nearby to the east and south of the Game Lands.

== Statistics ==
The elevation is 187 feet (57 m). It consists of an island of 4.75 acres (1.92 ha) in the Schuylkill River

== See also ==
- Pennsylvania State Game Lands
- Pennsylvania State Game Lands Number 43, also located in Berks County
- Pennsylvania State Game Lands Number 52, also located in Berks County
- Pennsylvania State Game Lands Number 80, also located in Berks County
- Pennsylvania State Game Lands Number 106, also located in Berks County
- Pennsylvania State Game Lands Number 110, also located in Berks County
- Pennsylvania State Game Lands Number 182, also located in Berks County
- Pennsylvania State Game Lands Number 274, also located in Berks County
- Pennsylvania State Game Lands Number 280, also located in Berks County
- Pennsylvania State Game Lands Number 315, also located in Berks County
