= Goodville, Pennsylvania =

Unincorporated community in Pennsylvania, US

- Census-designated place
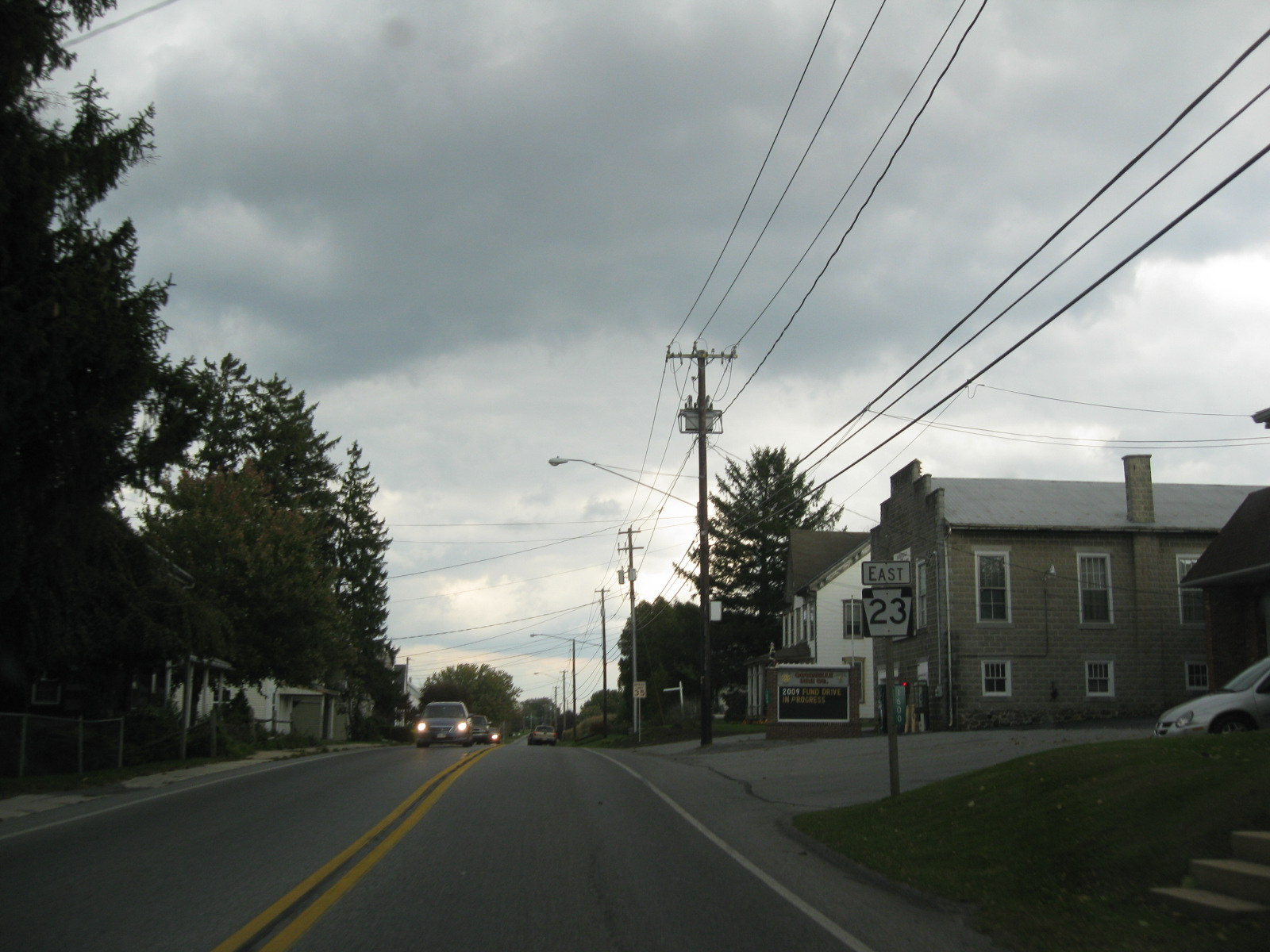
- Goodville in 2009

- Location in Pennsylvania Location in the United States
- Coordinates: 40°7′32″N 76°0′11″W
- Country: United States
- State: Pennsylvania
- County: Lancaster
- Township: East Earl

Area
  - Total: 1.54 sq mi (4.00 km^{2})
  - Land: 1.54 sq mi (3.99 km^{2})
  - Water: 0.0039 sq mi (0.01 km^{2})
- Elevation: 678 ft (207 m)

Population (2020)
  - Total: 388
  - Density: 251.7/sq mi (97.19/km^{2})
- Time zone: UTC-5 (Eastern (EST))
  - Summer (DST): UTC-4 (EDT)
- ZIP code: 17519 (East Earl)
- Area code: 717
- FIPS code: 42-30096
- GNIS feature ID: 1175820

Goodville is an unincorporated community and census-designated place (CDP) in East Earl Township, Lancaster County, Pennsylvania, United States. As of the 2020 census, the population was 399, down from 482 at the 2010 census.

== Geography ==
Goodville is located along Pennsylvania Route 23 in northeastern Lancaster County, in the eastern part of East Earl Township. PA 23 leads northeast 6 miles (10 km) to the Pennsylvania Turnpike at Morgantown, and southwest 18 miles (29 km) to Lancaster, the county seat.

According to the U.S. Census Bureau, the Goodville CDP has a total area of 1.5 square miles (4.0 km^{2}), of which 1.6 acres (6,349 m^{2}), or 0.16%, are water. The community is in the watershed of the Conestoga River, a west-flowing tributary of the Susquehanna.

== Demographics ==
Historical population
Census	Pop.	Note	%±
2020	388		—
U.S. Decennial Census
