= Bowmansville, Pennsylvania =

Unincorporated community in Pennsylvania, US

Bowmansville, Pennsylvania Baumanschteddel (Pennsylvania German)
- Census-designated place
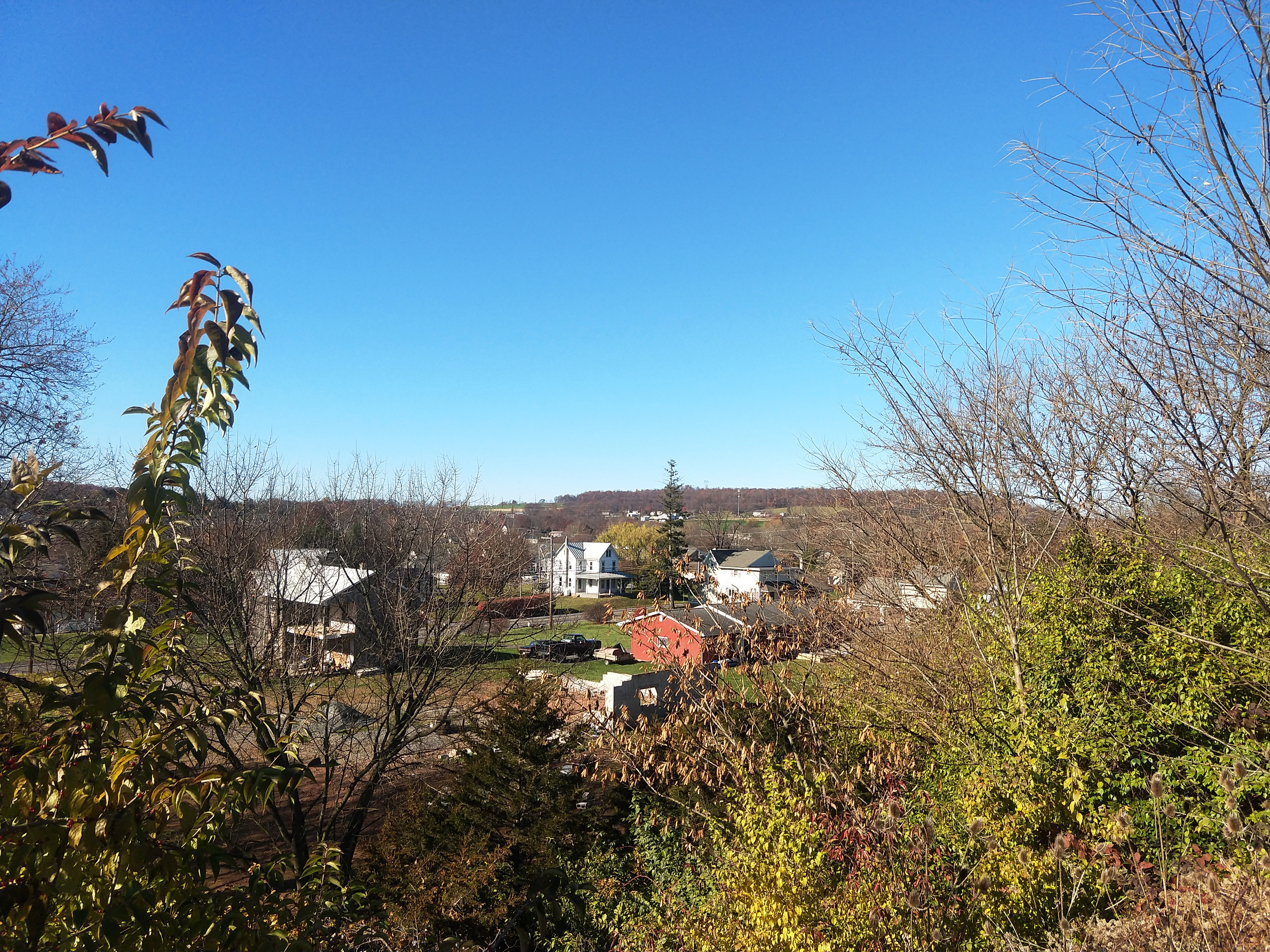
- View of Bowmansville from the Bowmansville Service Plaza

- Location in Pennsylvania Location in the United States
- Coordinates: 40°11′48″N 76°01′03″W
- Country: United States
- State: Pennsylvania
- County: Lancaster
- Township: Brecknock
- Founded: 1820

Area
  - Total: 2.15 sq mi (5.56 km^{2})
  - Land: 2.14 sq mi (5.53 km^{2})
  - Water: 0.012 sq mi (0.03 km^{2})
- Elevation: 434 ft (132 m)

Population (2020)
  - Total: 2,989
  - Density: 1,401/sq mi (540.8/km^{2})
- Time zone: UTC-5 (Eastern (EST))
  - Summer (DST): UTC-4 (EDT)
- ZIP code: 17507
- Area code: 717
- FIPS code: 42-07896
- GNIS feature ID: 1170075

Bowmansville (Pennsylvania German: Baumanschteddel) is an unincorporated community and census-designated place (CDP) in Brecknock Township, Lancaster County, Pennsylvania, United States. Bowmansville is home to the Pennsylvania Turnpike's Bowmansville Service Plaza. The population was 2,077 as of the 2010 census.

== History ==
Bowmansville was named for Samuel Bowman, an early settler.

The Bowmansville Roller Mill and John B. Good House are listed on the National Register of Historic Places.

== Geography ==
Bowmansville is in northeastern Lancaster County, near the center of Brecknock Township. The Pennsylvania Turnpike (Interstate 76) passes through the community, but with no direct access. The closest access is at Exit 286 (Reading, 4 miles (6 km) to the west near Swartzville. The Morgantown interchange (Exit 293) is 10 miles (16 km) to the east. Pennsylvania Route 625 (Reading Road) passes through the center of Bowmansville, leading north 12 miles (19 km) to Reading and south 7 miles (11 km) to East Earl. Lancaster, the county seat, is 21 miles (34 km) to the southwest.

According to the U.S. Census Bureau, the Bowmansville CDP has a total area of 1.9 square miles (4.9 km^{2}), of which 0.01 square miles (0.03 km^{2}), or 0.57%, are water. The community is drained by Muddy Creek, a west-flowing tributary of the Conestoga River, part of the Susquehanna River watershed.

== Demographics ==
Historical population
Census	Pop.	Note	%±
2020	2,989		—
U.S. Decennial Census
