= Pennsylvania State Game Lands Number 182 =

Park in the United States

- Location within Pennsylvania Location within the United States
- Location: Berks County
- Nearest town: Kutztown; Lenhartsville
- Coordinates: 40°31′44″N 75°49′4″W
- Area: 273 acres (110 ha)
- Elevation: 427 feet (130 m)
- Max. elevation: 620 feet (190 m)
- Min. elevation: 360 feet (110 m)
- Owner: Pennsylvania Game Commission
- Website: www.pgc.pa.gov/HuntTrap/StateGameLands/Documents/SGL%20Maps/SGL__182.pdf

The Pennsylvania State Game Lands Number 182 are Pennsylvania State Game Lands in Berks County in Pennsylvania in the United States providing hunting, bird watching, and other activities.

== Geography ==
SGL 182 consists of one parcel located in Greenwich and Richmond Townships in Berks County. The Game Lands is bisected by Sacony Creek, which drains to Maiden Creek, part of the Schuylkill River and then the Delaware River watersheds. Sacony Creek bisects the SGL 182. The lowest elevation is about 360 feet (110 m) along the creek bed, the highest elevation of the northern portion is about 440 feet (130 m) and the southern portion is about 620 feet (190 m). Other nearby protected areas include Pennsylvania State Game Lands 106, 110, 280, Appalachian National Scenic Trail and Weiser State Forest. Nearby communities include the boroughs of Kutztown and Lenhartsville, and populated places Bowers, Dreibelbis, Eagle Point, Grimville, Kempville, Klinesville, Krumsville, Mengel, Mill Creek Corner, Monterey, Mosolem, Mosolem Springs, New Smithville, Schofer, and Virginville. U.S. Route 222 passes to the south of the Game Lands, Pennsylvania Route 737 passes to the east, and Pennsylvania Route 143 passes to the west.

== Statistics ==
It consists of 273 acres (110 ha) in one parcel, elevations range from 360 feet (110 m) to 620 feet (190 m).

== Biology ==
Hunting and trapping game include deer (Odocoileus virginianus), rabbit (Sylvilagus floridanus), pheasant (Phasianus colchicus), squirrel (Sciurus carolinensis), and turkey (Meleagris gallopavo).

== See also ==
- Pennsylvania State Game Lands
- Pennsylvania State Game Lands Number 43, also located in Berks County
- Pennsylvania State Game Lands Number 52, also located in Berks County
- Pennsylvania State Game Lands Number 80, also located in Berks County
- Pennsylvania State Game Lands Number 106, also located in Berks County
- Pennsylvania State Game Lands Number 110, also located in Berks County
- Pennsylvania State Game Lands Number 274, also located in Berks County
- Pennsylvania State Game Lands Number 280, also located in Berks County
- Pennsylvania State Game Lands Number 315, also located in Berks County
- Pennsylvania State Game Lands Number 324, also located in Berks County
