= Pennsylvania State Game Lands Number 274 =

Park in the United States

- Location within Pennsylvania Location within the United States
- Location: Berks County; Lancaster County
- Nearest city: Reading
- Coordinates: 40°16′15″N 76°3′53″W
- Area: 668 acres (270 ha)
- Elevation: 456 feet (139 m)
- Max. elevation: 1,063 feet (324 m)
- Min. elevation: 540 feet (160 m)
- Owner: Pennsylvania Game Commission
- Website: www.pgc.pa.gov/HuntTrap/StateGameLands/Documents/SGL%20Maps/SGL__274.pdf

The Pennsylvania State Game Lands Number 274 are Pennsylvania State Game Lands in Berks and Lancaster Counties in Pennsylvania in the United States providing hunting, bird watching, and other activities.

== Geography ==
SGL 274 consists of two parcels located in South Heidelberg Township in Berks County and in East Cocalico Township in Lancaster County. The Game Lands is drained by tributaries of Cocalico Creek which flows to Conestoga River, part of the Susquehanna River watershed. The lowest elevation is about 540 feet (160 m), the highest elevation is 1,063 feet (324 m). Other nearby protected areas include Pennsylvania State Game Lands 46, 220, 225 and the Nolde Forest Environmental Education Center. Nearby communities include the City of Reading, the boroughs of Adamstown, Denver, Mohnton, Sinking Spring, Wyomissing, Wyomissing Hills, and populated places Alleghenyville, Angelica, Birdland, Blainsport, Fritztown, Gouglersville, Highland, Knauers, Mohns Hill, Montello, Montrose, Overbrook, Pennwyn, Reinholds, Shiloh Hills, Spring Dale Heights, Swartzville, Tallowyck, Vera Cruz, Vinemont, Welsh Woods, and West Wyomissing. U.S. Route 222 and Pennsylvania Route 272 pass along the south of SGL 274.

== Statistics ==
The elevation is 456 feet (139 m). It consists of 668 acres (270 ha) in one parcel, elevations range from 540 feet (160 m) to 1,063 feet (324 m).

== See also ==
- Pennsylvania State Game Lands
- Pennsylvania State Game Lands Number 43, also located in Berks County
- Pennsylvania State Game Lands Number 52, also located in Berks and Lancaster Counties
- Pennsylvania State Game Lands Number 80, also located in Berks County
- Pennsylvania State Game Lands Number 106, also located in Berks County
- Pennsylvania State Game Lands Number 110, also located in Berks County
- Pennsylvania State Game Lands Number 182, also located in Berks County
- Pennsylvania State Game Lands Number 280, also located in Berks County
- Pennsylvania State Game Lands Number 315, also located in Berks County
- Pennsylvania State Game Lands Number 324, also located in Berks County
