= Alleghany Mennonite Meetinghouse =

Historic church in Pennsylvania, United States

- U.S. National Register of Historic Places
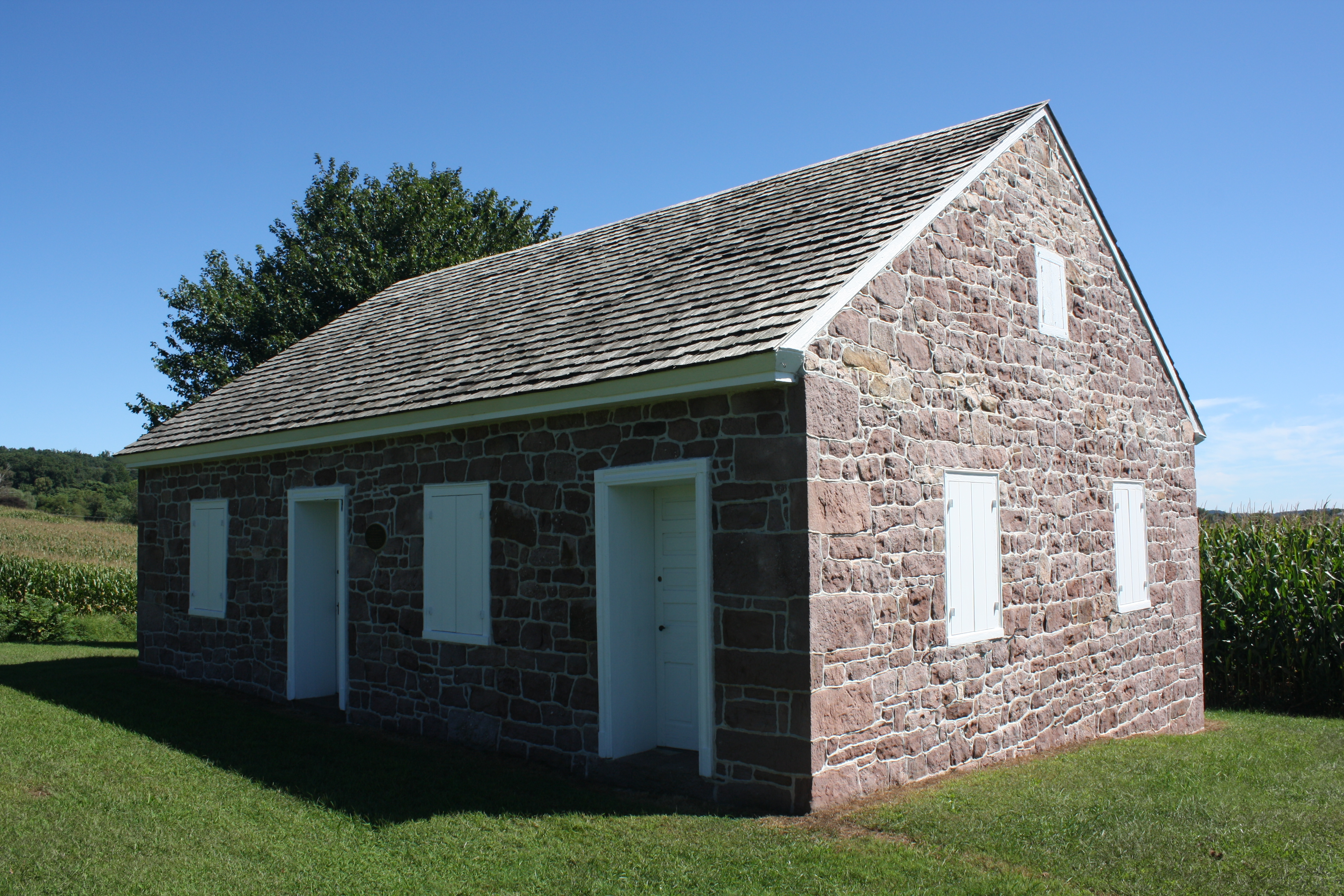
- Alleghany Mennonite Meetinghouse in Brecknock Township, Pennsylvania, September 2013

- Location within Pennsylvania Location within the United States
- Location: 39 Horning Rd., Brecknock Township, Pennsylvania, U.S.
- Coordinates: 40°14′07″N 75°58′17″W
- Area: less than one acre
- Built: 1855
- Architectural style: Pennsylvania German
- NRHP reference No.: 09000384
- Added to NRHP: June 6, 2009

The Alleghany Mennonite Meetinghouse is located at 39 Horning Road in, Brecknock Township, Pennsylvania. The meetinghouse and its associated cemetery are significant for their role in the Mennonite community in this area of Pennsylvania in the mid to late 19th century. The meetinghouse is significant for its Pennsylvania German-style architecture.

The property was added to the National Register of Historic Places (NRHP) on June 6, 2009, and the listing was announced as the featured listing in the National Park Service's weekly list of June 12, 2009.

== Gallery ==
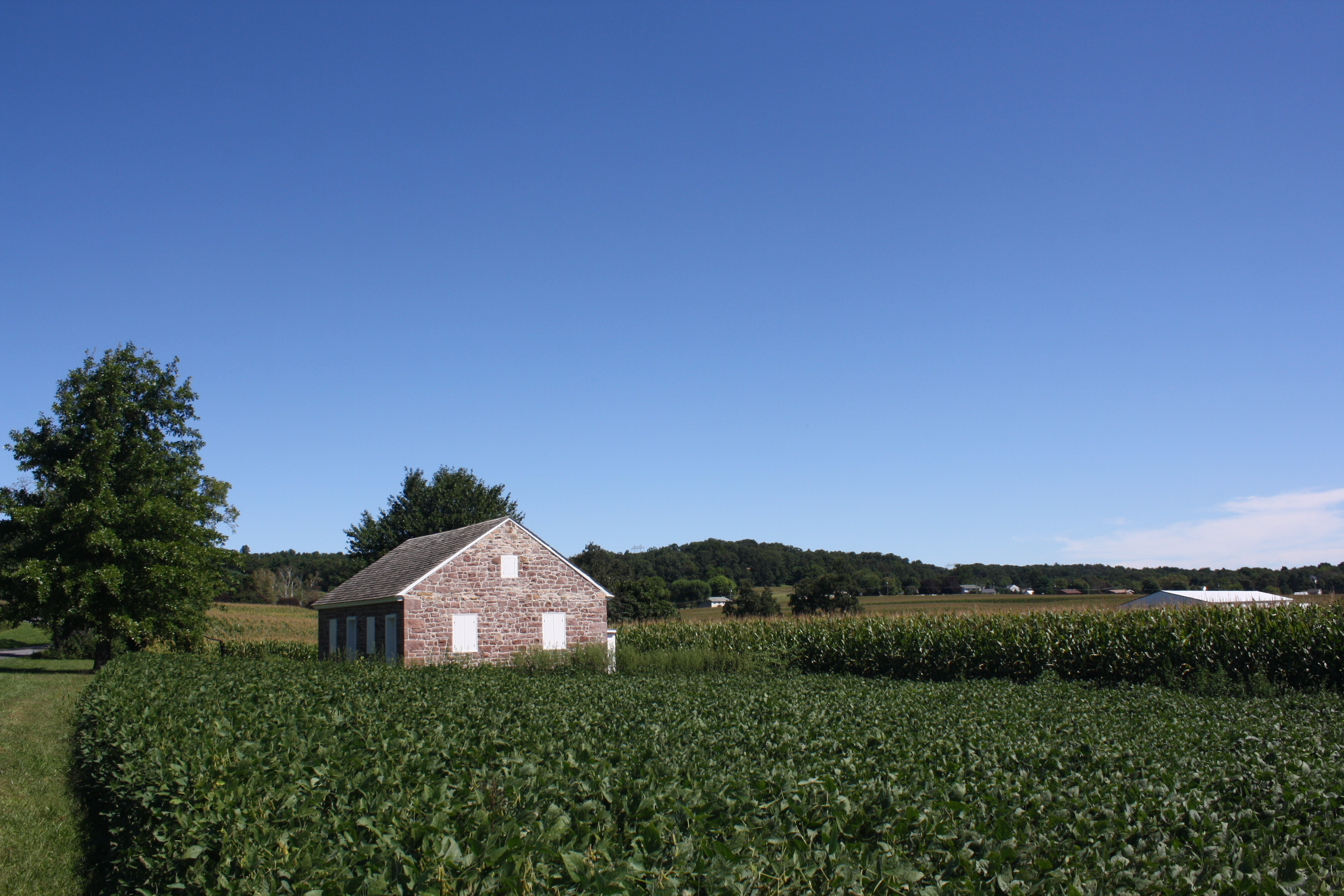

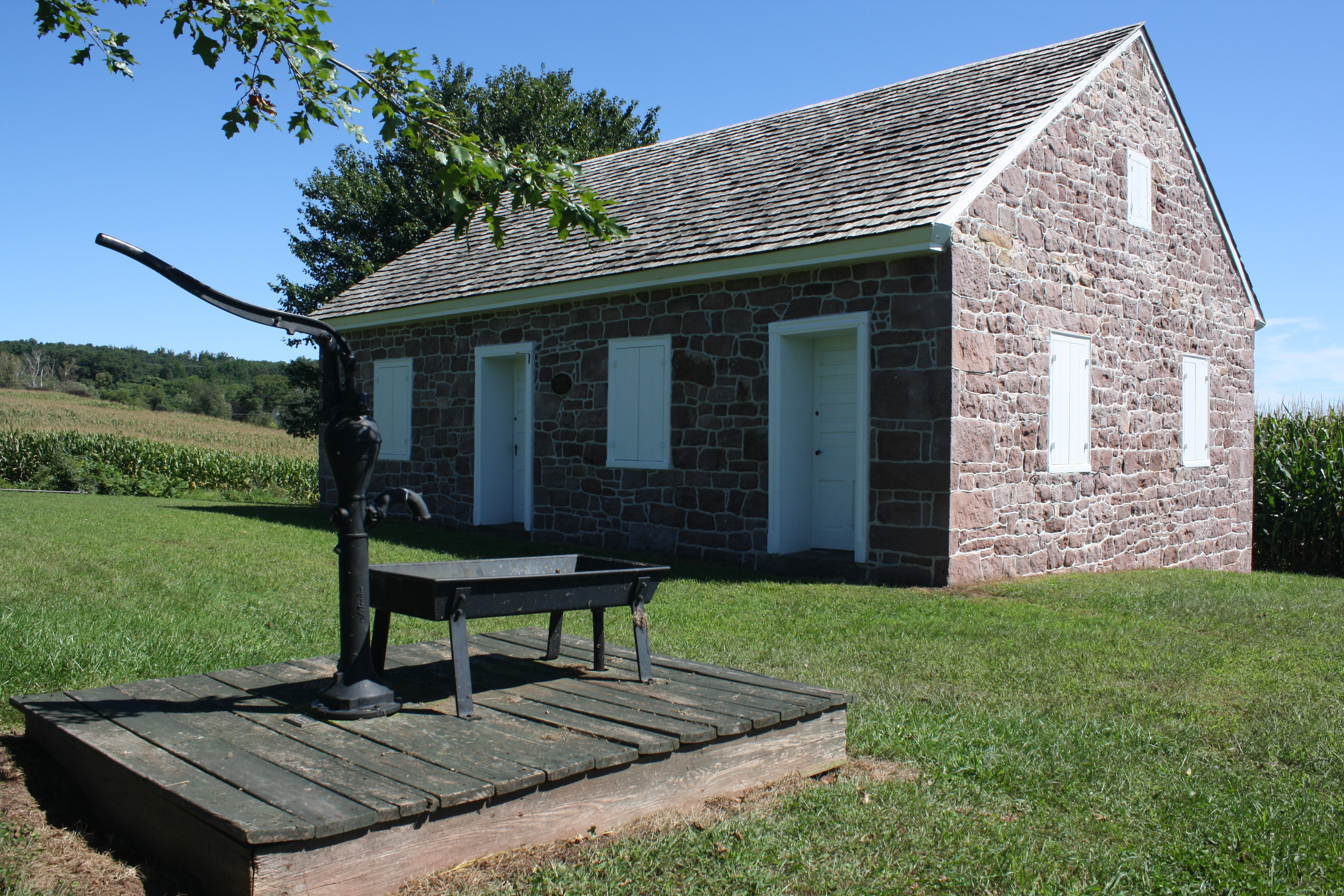

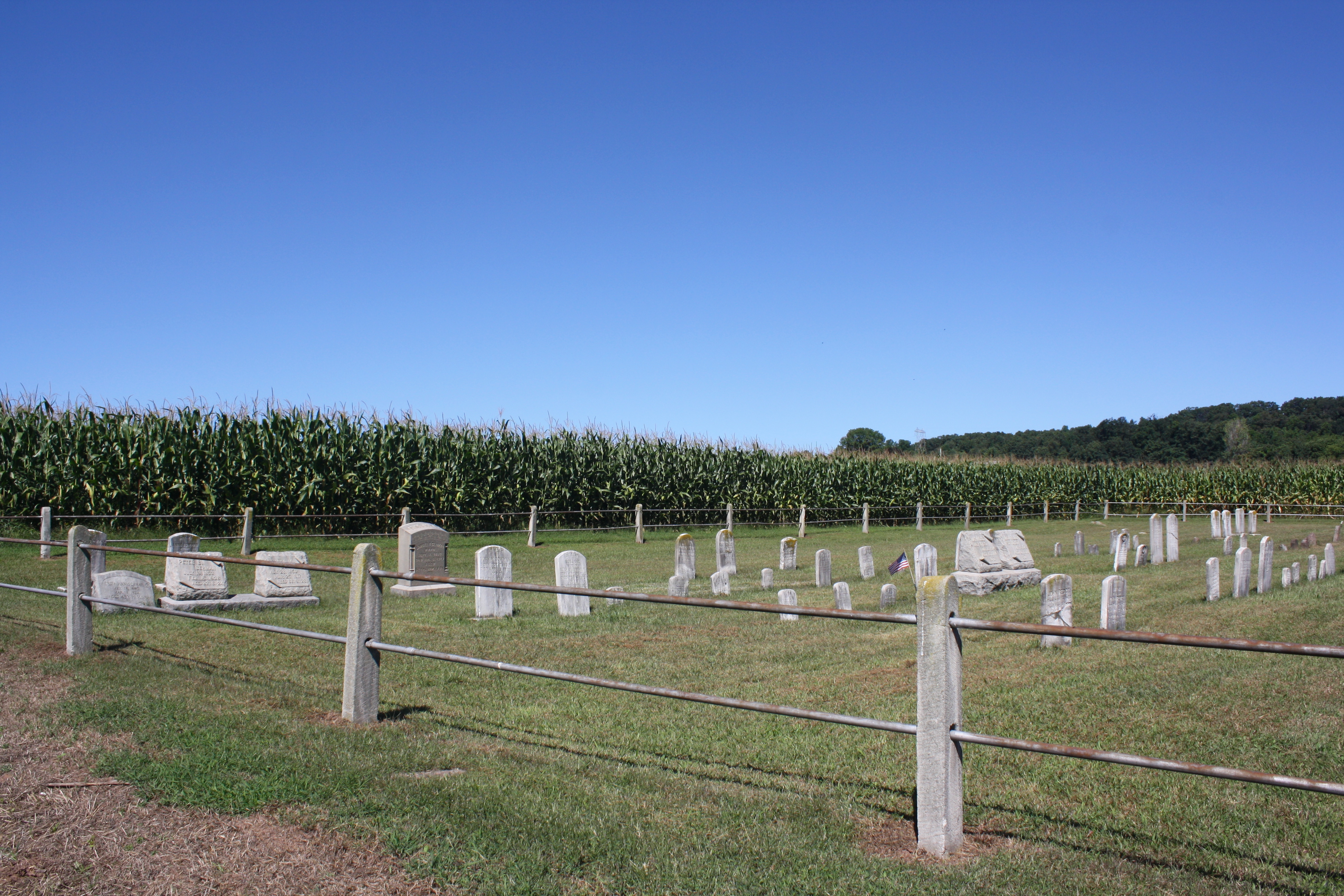

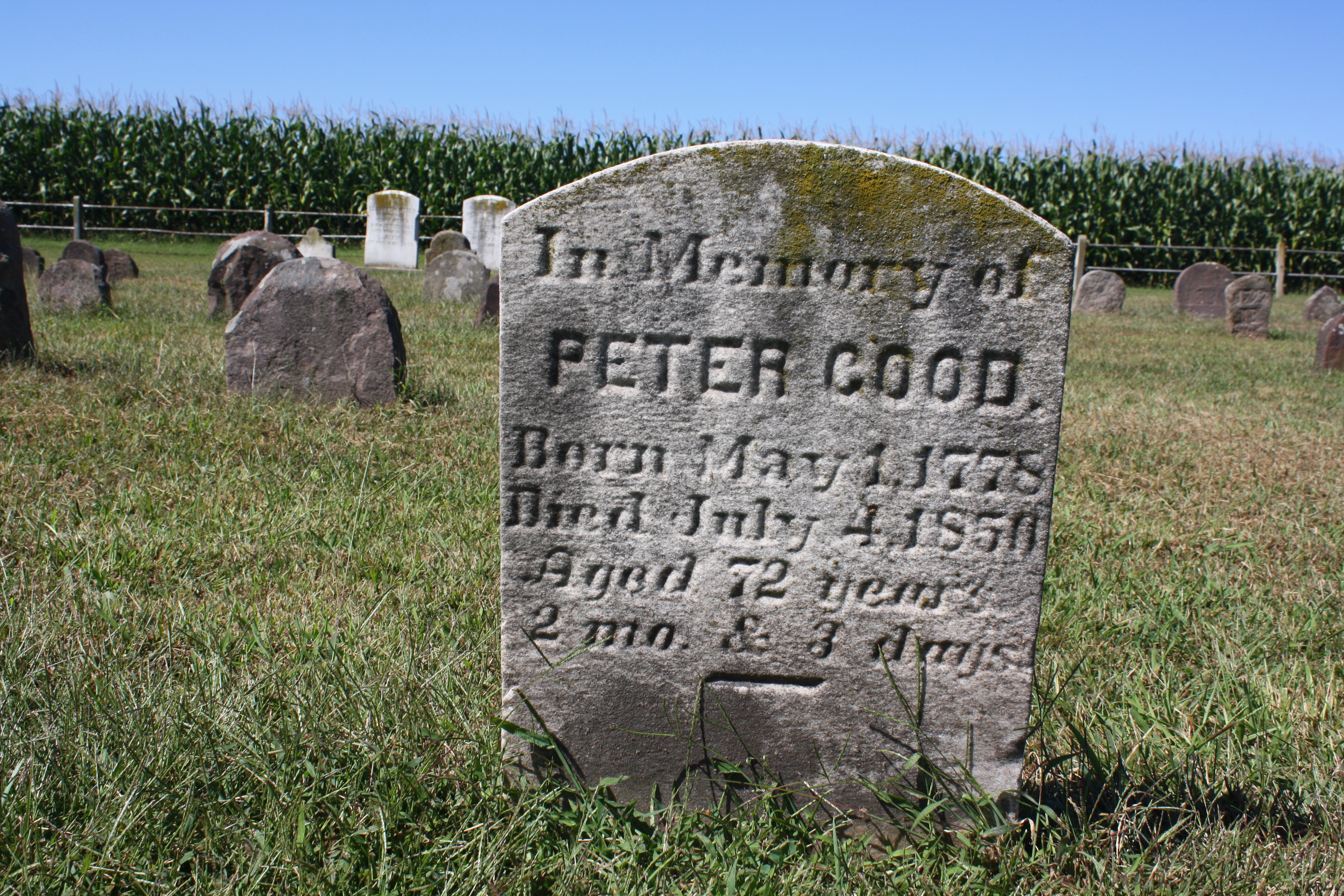

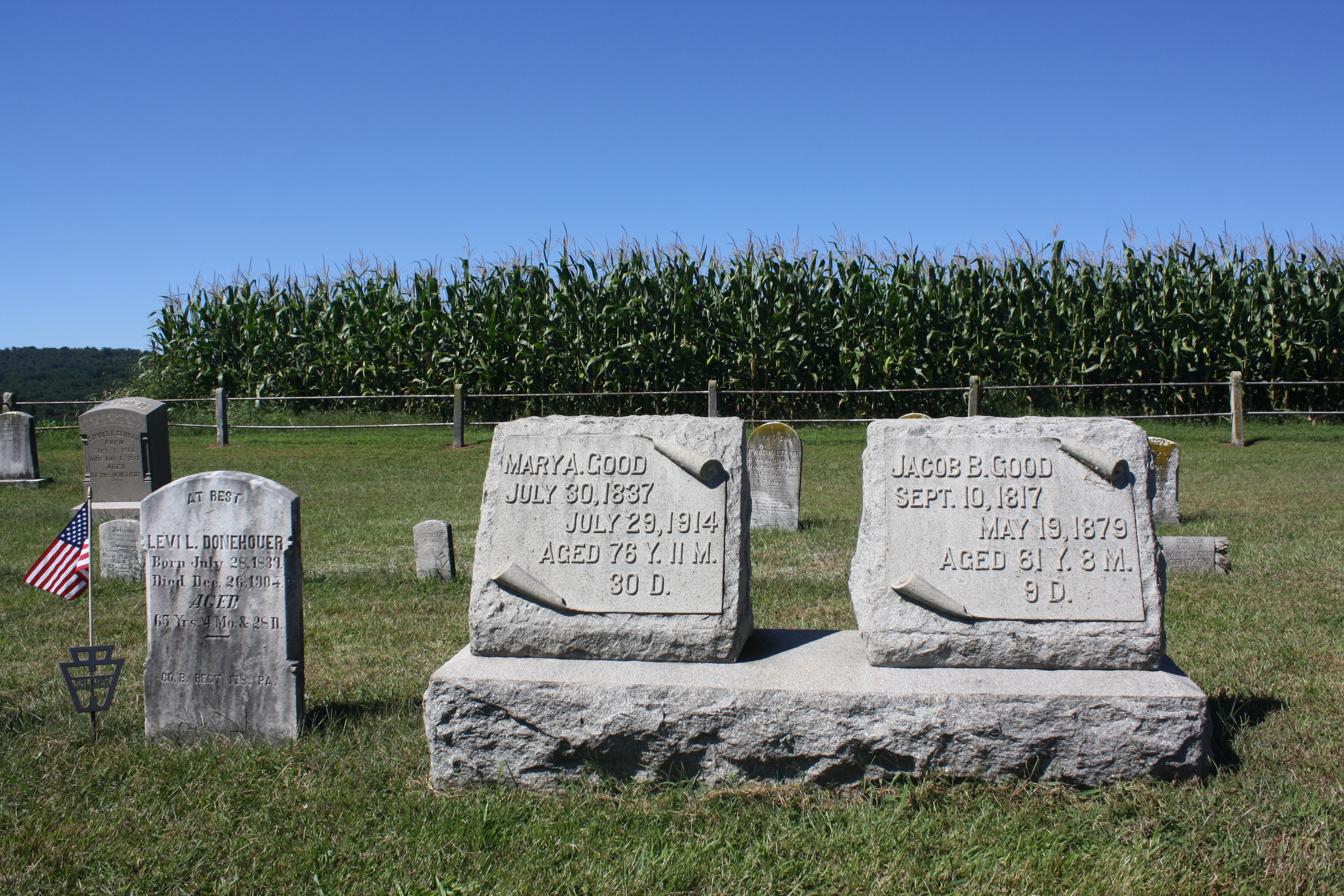
