= Pennsylvania State Game Lands Number 280 =

Park in the United States

- Location within Pennsylvania Location within the United States
- Location: Berks County
- Nearest city: Reading, Pennsylvania, U.S.
- Coordinates: 40°22′18″N 76°4′0″W
- Area: 2,552 acres (1,033 ha)
- Elevation: 427 feet (130 m)
- Max. elevation: 522 feet (159 m)
- Min. elevation: 360 feet (110 m)
- Owner: Pennsylvania Game Commission
- Website: www.pgc.pa.gov/HuntTrap/StateGameLands/Documents/SGL%20Maps/SGL__280.pdf

The Pennsylvania State Game Lands Number 280 are Pennsylvania State Game Lands in Berks County in Pennsylvania in the United States providing hunting, bird watching, and other activities.

== Geography ==
SGL 274 consists of three parcels located in Bern, Penn, and Lower Heidelberg Townships in Berks County. Blue Marsh Lake, located between parcels of SGL 280, is part of the Tulpehocken Creek watershed, which is part of the watershed of the Schuylkill River and ultimately, the Delaware River. The lowest elevation is about 360 feet (110 m), the highest is about 522 feet (159 m).

Pennsylvania State Game Lands Number 225 and the Middle Creek Wildlife Management Area is located about 8 miles (13 km) to the southwest. The city of Reading is located about 5 miles (8.0 km) to the southwest. Nearby communities include the City of Reading, the boroughs of Bernville and Leesport, and populated places Brownsville, Fairview Heights, Garfield, Leinbachs, Mount Pleasant, North Heidelberg, Pleasant Valley, Rickenbach, State Hill, Van Reeds Mill, and West Leesport. U.S. Route 222 passes to the southeast, Pennsylvania Route 183 passes between two parcels of SGL 280.

== Statistics ==
The elevation is 427 feet (130 m). It consists of 2,552 acres (1,033 ha) in three parcels, elevations range from 360 feet (110 m) to 522 feet (159 m).

== See also ==
- Pennsylvania State Game Lands
- Pennsylvania State Game Lands Number 43, also located in Berks County
- Pennsylvania State Game Lands Number 52, also located in Berks and Lancaster Counties
- Pennsylvania State Game Lands Number 80, also located in Berks County
- Pennsylvania State Game Lands Number 106, also located in Berks County
- Pennsylvania State Game Lands Number 110, also located in Berks County
- Pennsylvania State Game Lands Number 182, also located in Berks County
- Pennsylvania State Game Lands Number 274, also located in Berks County
- Pennsylvania State Game Lands Number 315, also located in Berks County
- Pennsylvania State Game Lands Number 324, also located in Berks County
