= Henry Weaver Farmstead =

Historic house in Pennsylvania, United States

- U.S. National Register of Historic Places
- Location within Pennsylvania Location within the United States
- Location: West Quarry Rd.; South of Terre Hill off U.S. Route 322, East Earl Township, Pennsylvania
- Coordinates: 40°8′4″N 76°3′38″W
- Area: 6.7 acres (2.7 ha)
- Built: 1761, ca. 1764
- Built by: Weaver (Weber), Henry
- NRHP reference No.: 78002422
- Added to NRHP: December 15, 1978

Henry Weaver Farmstead was a historic home located at East Earl Township, Lancaster County, Pennsylvania. The house was a large, 2 1/2-story, L-shaped, limestone building with a steeply pitched gable roof. The roof was sheathed in tile laid in a side lap. It was built in at least two stages, with the oldest section dated to about 1761. Also on the property were a contributing stone smokehouse and stone barn built in 1764.

It was listed on the National Register of Historic Places in 1978.

Structures including the house were scheduled to be demolished in the summer of 1978 to allow expansion of the quarry owned by the Martin Limestone Company. Over objections, the demolition was carried out as scheduled or shortly afterwards.
