= East Earl Township, Pennsylvania =

Township in Pennsylvania, US

Coordinates: 40°07′00″N 76°00′59″W

- Township
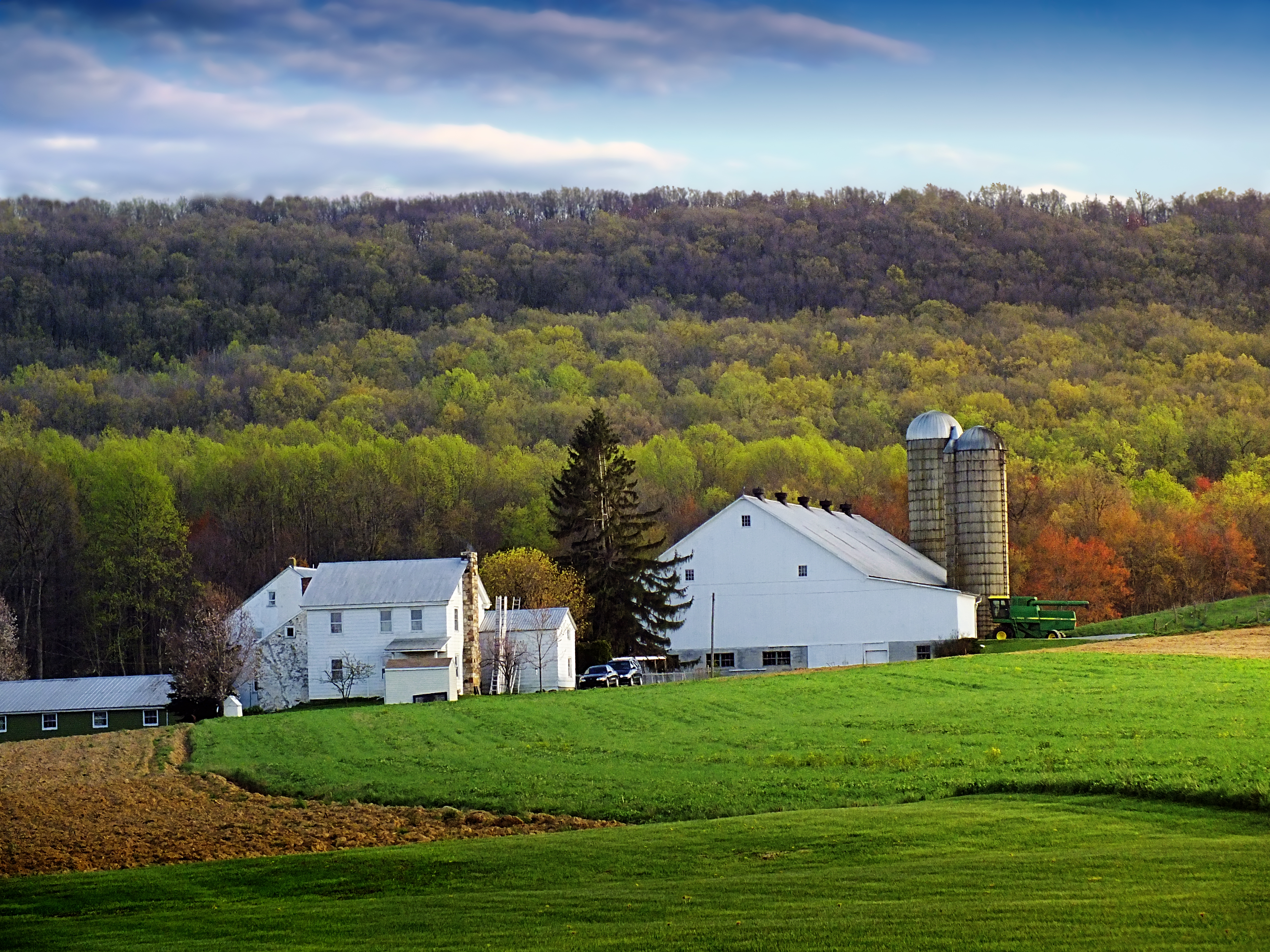
- A farm in the township

- Seal

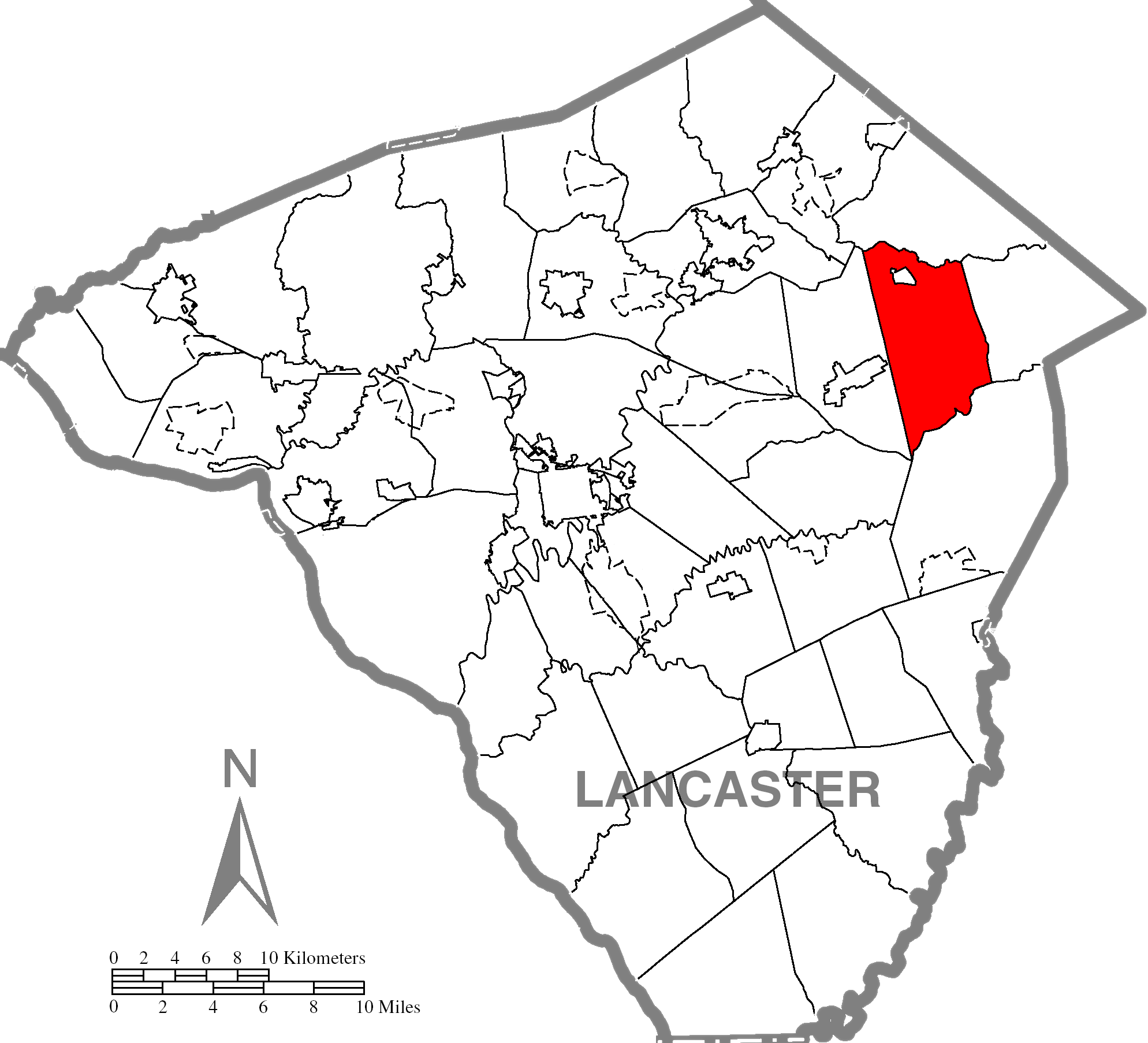
- Map of Lancaster County, Pennsylvania highlighting East Earl Township

- Map of Lancaster County, Pennsylvania
- Country: United States
- State: Pennsylvania
- County: Lancaster
- Settled: 1722
- Incorporated: 1851

Government
  - Type: Board of Supervisors

Area
  - Total: 24.75 sq mi (64.09 km^{2})
  - Land: 24.54 sq mi (63.57 km^{2})
  - Water: 0.20 sq mi (0.52 km^{2})

Population (2020)
  - Total: 6,721 ▲
  - Estimate (2021): 6,755
  - Density: 276.7/sq mi (106.84/km^{2})
- Time zone: UTC-5 (Eastern (EST))
  - Summer (DST): UTC-4 (EDT)
- Area code: 717
- FIPS code: 42-071-21072
- Website: www.eastearltwp.org

East Earl Township is a township in northeastern Lancaster County, Pennsylvania, United States. At the 2020 census, the population was 6,721.

== History ==
The Spring Grove Forge Mansion and Henry Weaver Farmstead are listed on the National Register of Historic Places.

== Geography ==
According to the U.S. Census Bureau, the township has a total area of 24.7 square miles (64 km^{2}), of which 24.6 square miles (64 km^{2}) is land and 0.1 square miles (0.26 km^{2}) (0.24%) is water. It contains the communities of Union Grove, Weaverland, Goodville, Blue Ball, East Earl, Fetterville, and Cedar Lane. The township surrounds the borough of Terre Hill, a separate municipality. Welsh Mountain, elevation 1,107 feet (337 m), is on the southern border of the township.

== Demographics ==
Historical population
Census	Pop.	Note	%±
2000	5,723		—
2010	6,507		13.7%
2020	6,721		3.3%
2021 (est.)	6,755		0.5%
U.S. Decennial Census

At the 2000 census there were 5,723 people, 1,738 households, and 1,485 families living in the township. The population density was 232.6 inhabitants per square mile (89.8/km^{2}). There were 1,795 housing units at an average density of 73.0 units per square mile (28.2 units/km^{2}). The racial makeup of the township was 98.17% White, 0.58% Black or African American, 0.05% Native American, 0.37% Asian, 0.03% Pacific Islander, 0.12% from other races, and 0.68% from two or more races. 0.66% of the population were Hispanic or Latino of any race. There were 1,738 households, 42.2% had children under the age of 18 living with them, 75.8% were married couples living together, 6.3% had a female householder with no husband present, and 14.5% were non-families. 11.9% of households were made up of individuals, and 5.1% were one person aged 65 or older. The average household size was 3.28 and the average family size was 3.59.

The age distribution was 33.4% under the age of 18, 9.5% from 18 to 24, 25.1% from 25 to 44, 21.0% from 45 to 64, and 11.0% 65 or older. The median age was 32 years. For every 100 females, there were 99.8 males. For every 100 females age 18 and over, there were 97.8 males.

The median household income was $48,118 and the median family income was $51,450. Males had a median income of $36,438 versus $20,923 for females. The per capita income for the township was $17,127. About 3.2% of families and 5.2% of the population were below the poverty line, including 9.1% of those under age 18 and 2.0% of those age 65 or over.
