= Landis Store, Pennsylvania =

Village in the U.S. state of Pennsylvania

Coordinates: 40°25′35″N 75°39′39″W

Landis Store is a village in District Township, Berks County, Pennsylvania, United States. It is drained by the West Branch Perkiomen Creek into the Perkiomen Creek in the Green Lane Reservoir. It is split between the Alburtis zip code of 18011, the Barto zip code of 19504, and the Boyertown zip code of 19512.

It is approximately 10 minutes from Bally and 15 minutes away from Boyertown. It sits at the intersections of Forgedale, Conrad, Baldy Hill, Landis Store, and Oysterdale Roads. The village is surrounded by the Oley Hills with its peaceful forest and narrow streams.

Some near by attractions include Bally Springs Inn and Bear Creek Mountain Resort.

== History ==
The community derived its name from Samuel Landis, who once kept a store and tavern there. A post office was established at Landis' Store in 1853, and remained in operation until 1956. The post office first opened in Samuel Landis's general store.
