= Lobachsville, Pennsylvania =

Unincorporated community in Pennsylvania, US

- Unincorporated community
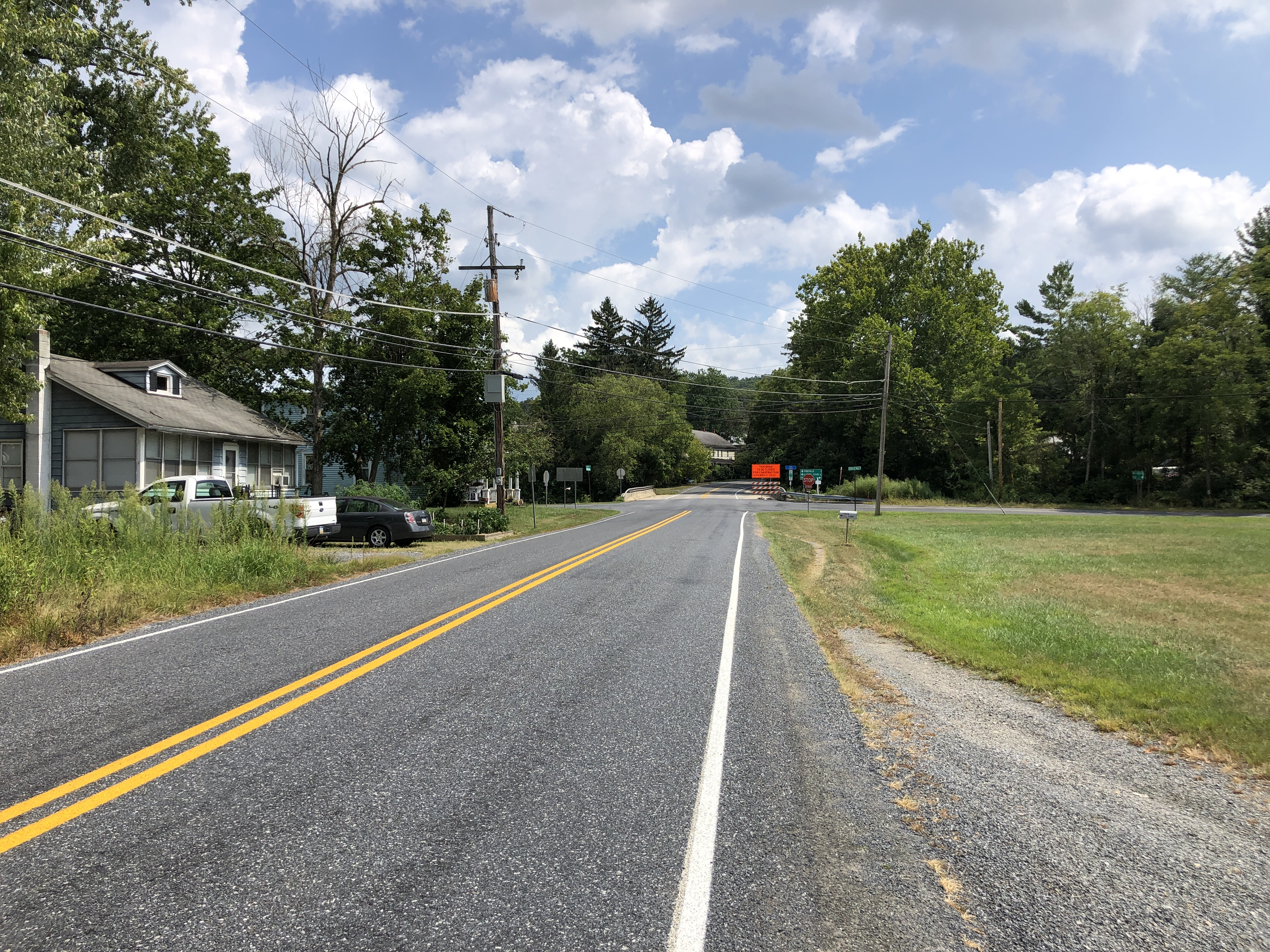
- Lobachsville Road southbound in Lobachsville

- Location within Pennsylvania
- Coordinates: 40°24′34″N 75°44′6″W
- Country: United States
- State: Pennsylvania
- County: Berks
- Township: Pike
- Elevation: 364 ft (111 m)
- Time zone: UTC-5 (Eastern (EST))
  - Summer (DST): UTC-4 (EDT)
- Area codes: 610 and 484
- GNIS feature ID: 1179740

Lobachsville is an unincorporated community in Pike Township in Berks County, Pennsylvania, United States. Lobachsville is located at the intersection of Lobachsville Road and Bertolet Mill Road/Long Lane.
