= Brecknock Township, Lancaster County, Pennsylvania =

Township in Pennsylvania, US

Coordinates: 40°11′44″N 76°02′09″W

- Township
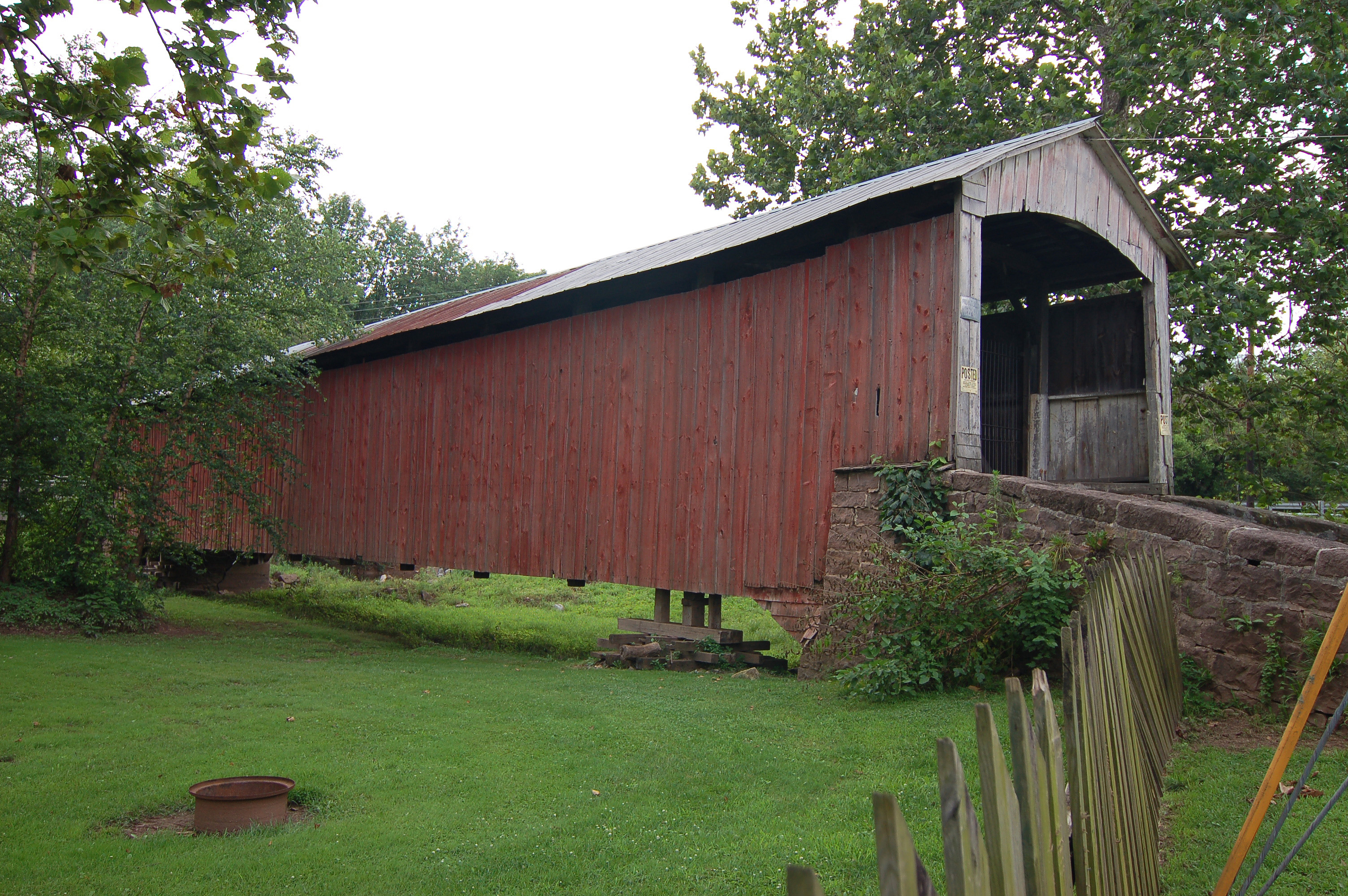
- Red Run Covered Bridge (1866); National Register of Historic Places

- Seal

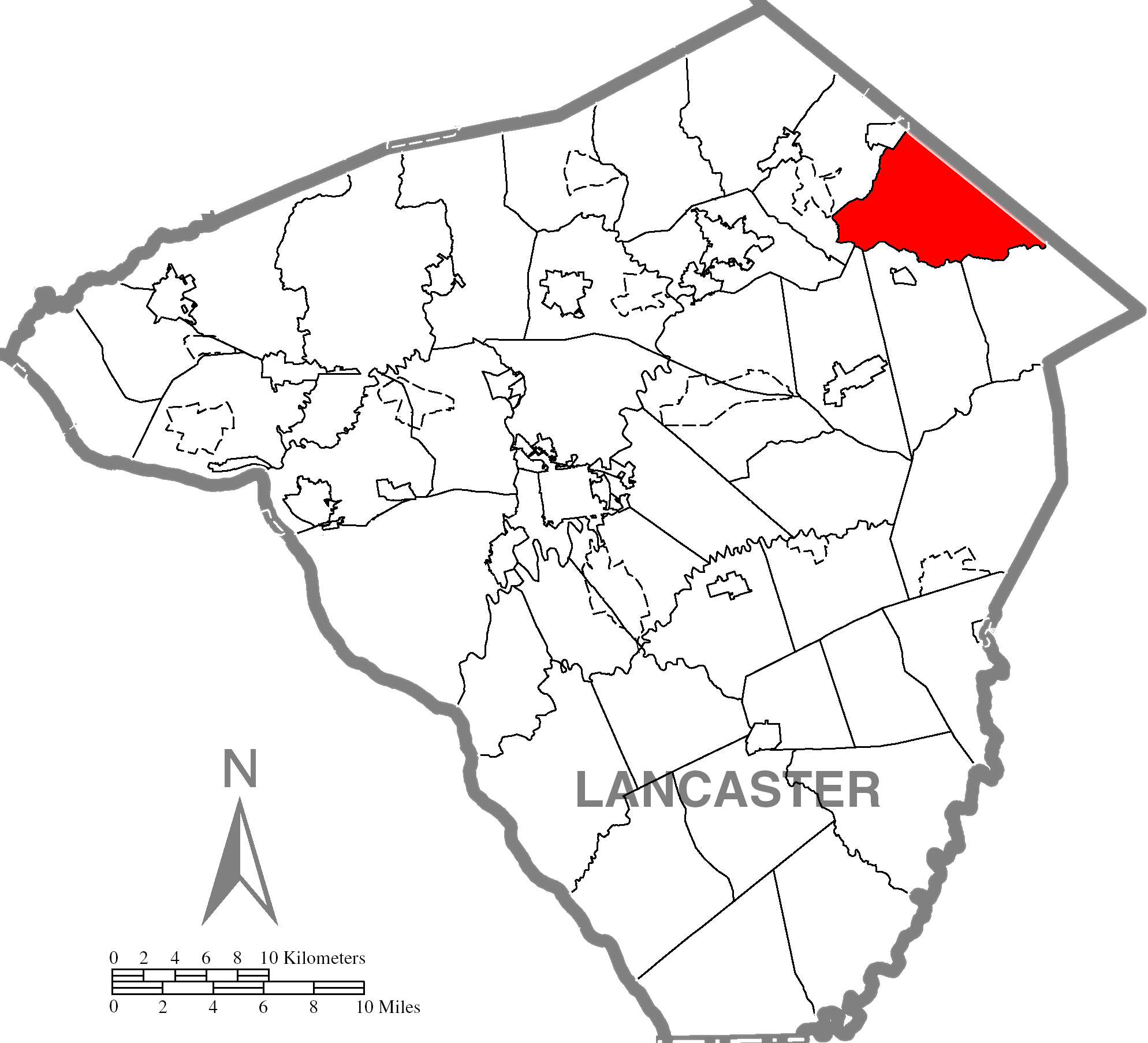
- Map of Lancaster County highlighting Brecknock Township
- Country: United States
- State: Pennsylvania
- County: Lancaster
- Settled: 1730
- Incorporated: 1740

Government
  - Type: Board of Supervisors

Area
  - Total: 24.86 sq mi (64.40 km^{2})
  - Land: 24.65 sq mi (63.84 km^{2})
  - Water: 0.22 sq mi (0.57 km^{2})

Population (2020)
  - Total: 7,585 ▲
  - Estimate (2021): 7,598
  - Density: 303.0/sq mi (116.97/km^{2})
- Time zone: UTC-5 (Eastern (EST))
  - Summer (DST): UTC-4 (EDT)
- Area code: 717
- FIPS code: 42-071-08352
- Website: brecknocktownship.us

Brecknock Township is a township in northeastern Lancaster County, Pennsylvania, United States. The population was 7,585 at the 2020 census.

== History ==
Brecknock is a Welsh name.

The Bowmansville Roller Mill, John B. Good House, and Red Run Covered Bridge are listed on the National Register of Historic Places.

== Geography ==
According to the United States Census Bureau, the township has a total area of 24.9 square miles (64 km^{2}), of which 24.9 square miles (64 km^{2}) is land and 0.04% is water. It includes the communities of Bowmansville, Fivepointville, and Red Run.

== Recreation ==
Portions of the Pennsylvania State Game Lands Number 52 are located in the township.

== Demographics ==
Historical population
Census	Pop.	Note	%±
1980	4,068		—
1990	5,197		27.8%
2000	6,699		28.9%
2010	7,199		7.5%
2020	7,585		5.4%
2021 (est.)	7,598		0.2%
U.S. Decennial Census

As of the census of 2000, there were 6,699 people, 2,115 households, and 1,793 families living in the township. The population density was 268.8 inhabitants per square mile (103.8/km^{2}). There were 2,161 housing units at an average density of 86.7 per square mile (33.5/km^{2}). The racial makeup of the township was 97.70% White, 0.33% African American, 0.15% Native American, 0.75% Asian, 0.03% Pacific Islander, 0.30% from other races, and 0.75% from two or more races. Hispanic or Latino of any race were 0.96% of the population.

There were 2,115 households, out of which 42.1% had children under the age of 18 living with them, 76.1% were married couples living together, 5.5% had a female householder with no husband present, and 15.2% were non-families. 13.2% of all households were made up of individuals, and 5.6% had someone living alone who was 65 years of age or older. The average household size was 3.17 and the average family size was 3.48.

In the township the population was spread out, with 33.0% under the age of 18, 8.0% from 18 to 24, 27.6% from 25 to 44, 20.7% from 45 to 64, and 10.7% who were 65 years of age or older. The median age was 33 years. For every 100 females, there were 101.8 males. For every 100 females age 18 and over, there were 98.2 males.

The median income for a household in the township was $51,505, and the median income for a family was $53,329. Males had a median income of $36,210 versus $22,652 for females. The per capita income for the township was $18,578. About 5.1% of families and 8.8% of the population were below the poverty line, including 15.7% of those under age 18 and 4.6% of those age 65 or over.
