= Terre Hill, Pennsylvania =

Borough in Pennsylvania, US

- Borough
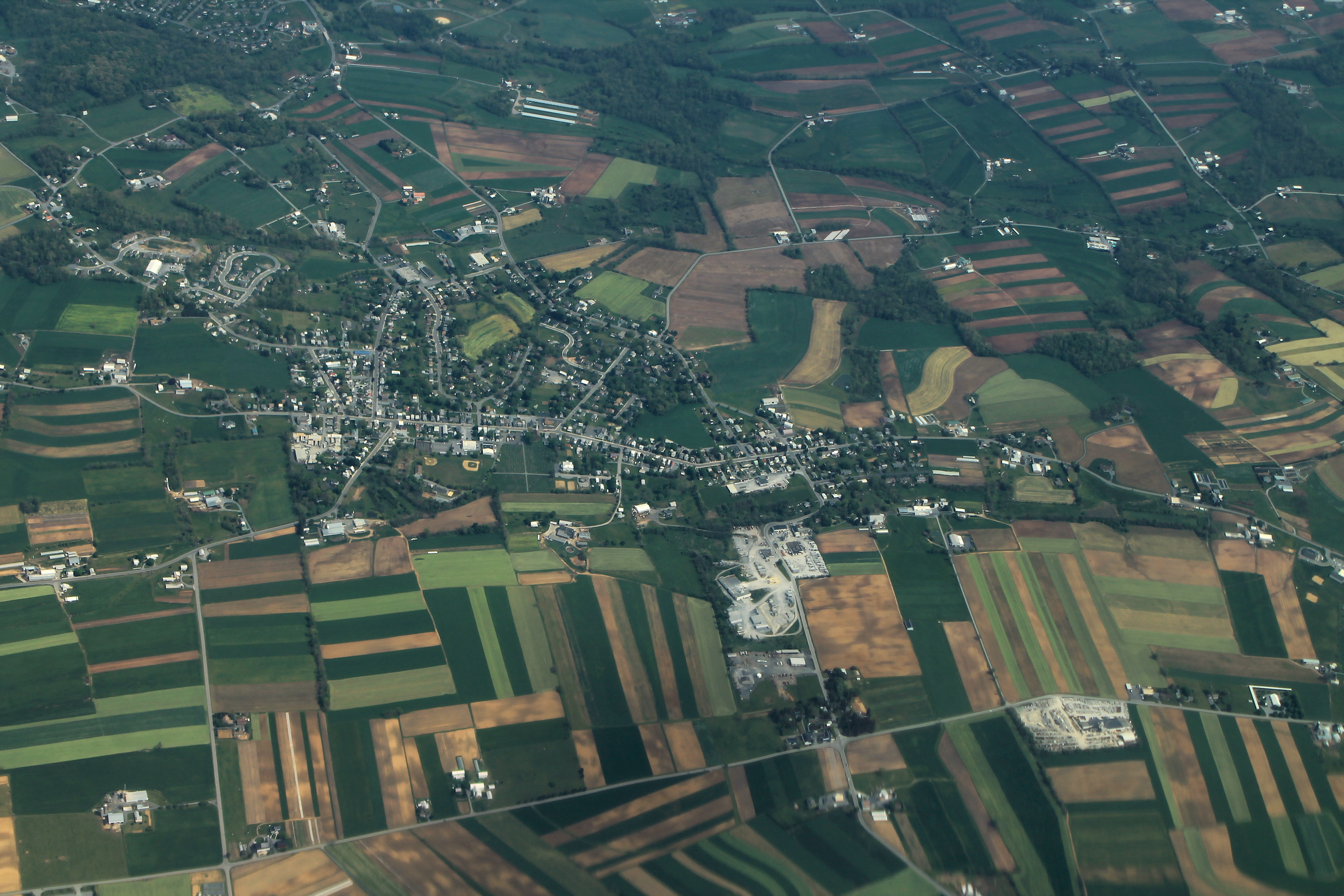
- Aerial view of Terre Hill

- Location in Lancaster County, Pennsylvania

- Location in Pennsylvania Location in the United States
- Coordinates: 40°09′27″N 76°03′01″W
- Country: United States
- State: Pennsylvania
- County: Lancaster

Government
  - Mayor: Troy Weaver (R)

Area
  - Total: 0.46 sq mi (1.18 km^{2})
  - Land: 0.46 sq mi (1.18 km^{2})
  - Water: 0 sq mi (0.00 km^{2})
- Elevation: 531 ft (162 m)

Population (2020)
  - Total: 1,357
  - Density: 2,985.5/sq mi (1,152.72/km^{2})
- Time zone: UTC-5 (EST)
  - Summer (DST): UTC-4 (EDT)
- ZIP code: 17581
- Area code: 717
- FIPS code: 42-76400
- Website: www.terrehillboro.com

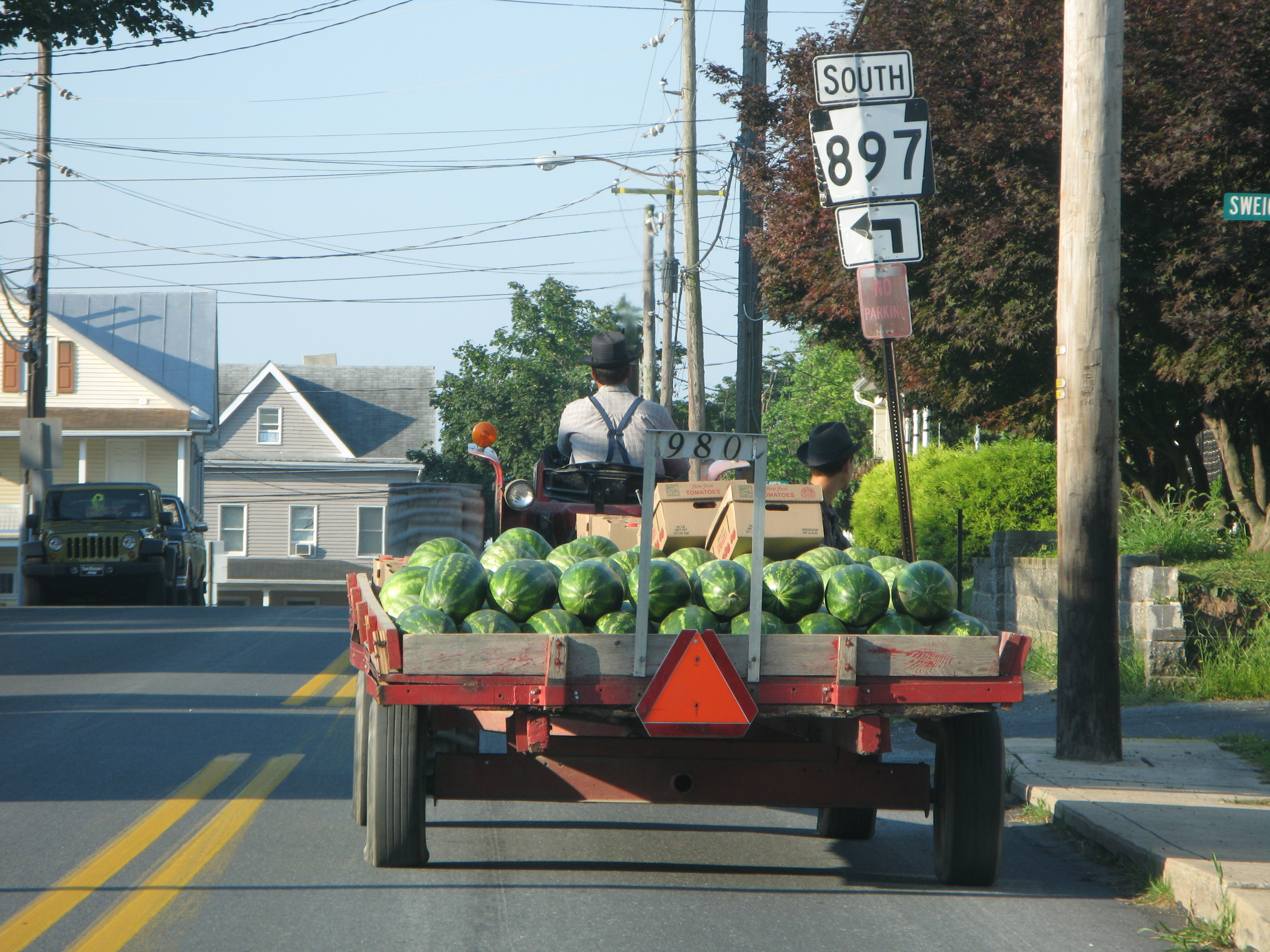
Watermelons on their way to a farmers market, near the intersection of Sweigart Street and Pennsylvania Route 897

Terre Hill is a borough in Lancaster County, Pennsylvania, United States. The population was 1,363 at the 2020 census.

== History ==
Terre Hill was formerly known as "Fairville". It was incorporated as a borough in 1907 after a successful court battle to separate from East Earl Township.

The borough was once considered to be the hub of cigar-making in Lancaster County. One of its most recognizable landmarks is the 19th-century clock at the borough hall.

Terre Hill has the second fewest residents of any incorporated borough in Lancaster County, with the exception of Christiana. Terre Hill has no traffic lights.

The first four-way stop in Terre Hill was created at the intersection of East Main Street and Earle Street in spring 2023. To create the four-way stop, two stop signs were added to East Main Street at the approaches to the already installed stop signs at Earle Street. The four-way stop was initially created with temporary stop signs during the closure of a section of PA Route 625 for underground pipe work. Shortly thereafter, the stop signs were made permanent.

== Geography ==
Terre Hill is located in northeastern Lancaster County at 40°9′27″N 76°3′1″W (40.157565, -76.050410). Pennsylvania Route 897 is the borough's Main Street, leading north 6 miles (10 km) to Swartzville and south 4 miles (6 km) to East Earl. Terre Hill is 18 miles (29 km) northeast of Lancaster, the county seat, and 16 miles (26 km) southwest of Reading.

According to the United States Census Bureau, the borough has a total area of 0.46 square miles (1.2 km^{2}), of which 0.3 acres (1,046 m^{2}), or 0.09%, are water. The community is on high ground overlooking the Weaverland Valley of eastern Lancaster County and is part of the watershed of the Conestoga River, a southwest-flowing tributary of the Susquehanna River.

== Demographics ==
Historical population
Census	Pop.	Note	%±
1890	891		—
1910	882		—
1920	840		−4.8%
1930	812		−3.3%
1940	907		11.7%
1950	1,000		10.3%
1960	1,129		12.9%
1970	1,129		0.0%
1980	1,217		7.8%
1990	1,282		5.3%
2000	1,237		−3.5%
2010	1,295		4.7%
2020	1,357		4.8%
2021 (est.)	1,355	▼	−0.1%
U.S. Decennial Census

As of the census of 2000, there were 1,237 people, 440 households, and 349 families residing in the borough. The population density was 2,710.3 inhabitants per square mile (1,046.5/km^{2}). There were 454 housing units at an average density of 994.7 per square mile (384.1/km^{2}). The racial makeup of the borough was 98.63% White, 0.16% African American, 0.08% Native American, 0.73% from other races, and 0.40% from two or more races. Hispanic or Latino of any race were 1.86% of the population.

There were 440 households, out of which 40.9% had children under the age of 18 living with them, 67.7% were married couples living together, 7.0% had a female householder with no husband present, and 20.5% were non-families. 17.3% of all households were made up of individuals, and 5.5% had someone living alone who was 65 years of age or older. The average household size was 2.81 and the average family size was 3.17.

In the borough the population was spread out, with 29.7% under the age of 18, 8.2% from 18 to 24, 30.1% from 25 to 44, 20.0% from 45 to 64, and 12.1% who were 65 years of age or older. The median age was 34 years. For every 100 females there were 101.8 males. For every 100 females age 18 and over, there were 97.3 males.

The median income for a household in the borough was $47,083, and the median income for a family was $47,891. Males had a median income of $36,815 versus $21,442 for females. The per capita income for the borough was $19,128. About 3.2% of families and 4.8% of the population were below the poverty line, including 7.0% of those under age 18 and 4.0% of those age 65 or over.

== Annual events ==
Numerous public events are held throughout the year for residents and community members. These special events are sponsored by the Terre Hill Park Association; a fundraising group that raises funds to support the Terre Hill Community Memorial Park. The Association donates all of its proceeds to maintenance and upkeep of the Terre Hill Park. Some events include Breakfast & Yard Sales in the Park, Lunch in the Park, Ice Cream Social, Park Benefit Auction, Movie Nights in the Park, and Community Egg Hunts. One of Terre Hill's main events is Terre Hill Days, held in the summer. In 2007, the borough celebrated its centennial year with a special Terre Hill Days festival.

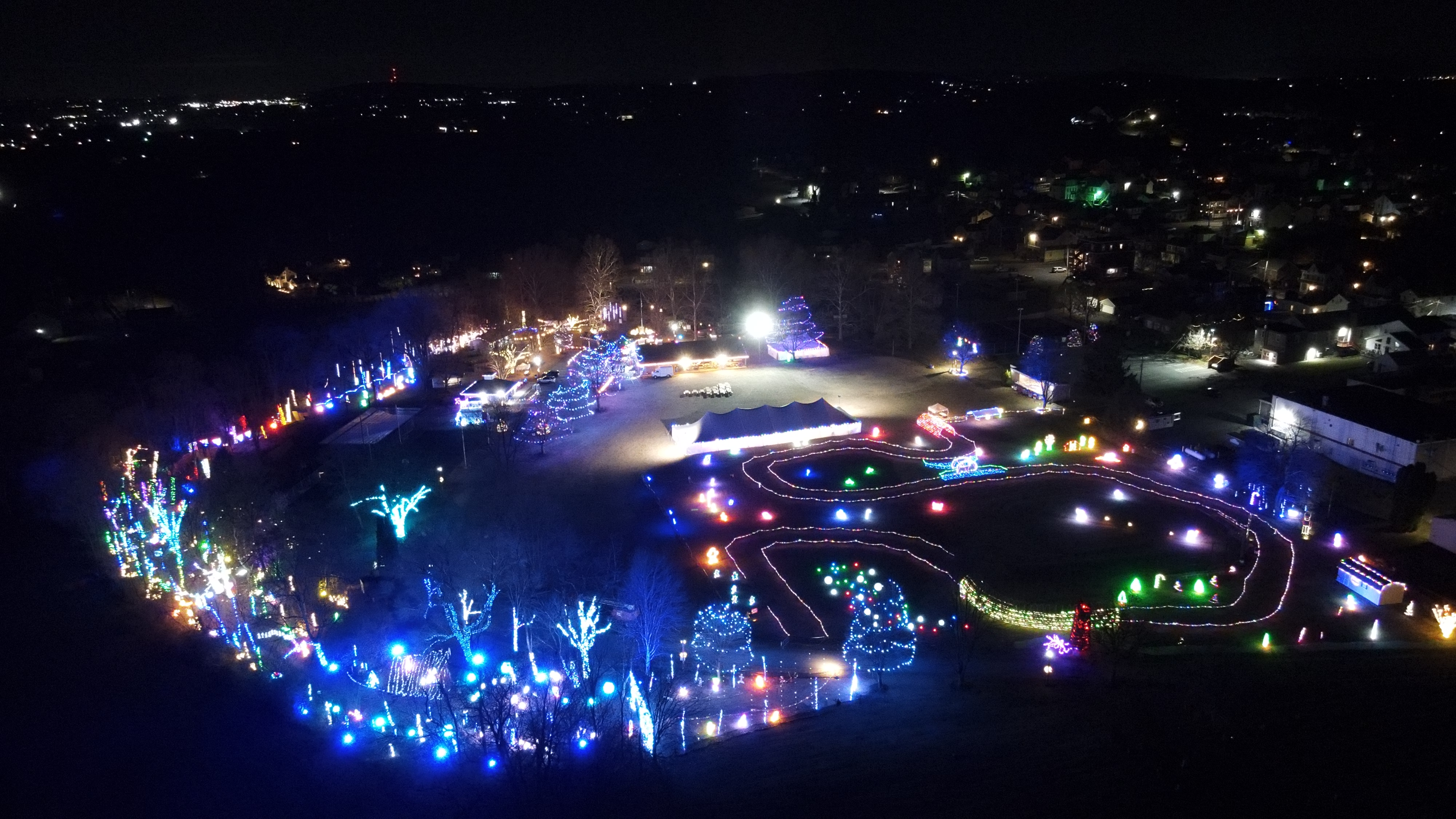
Bird's-eye view of Terre Hill Christmas in the Park, a few days before opening in 2024.

In 2018, 'Christmas in the Park' was added to the list of Terre Hill's annual events. This event has been held as a fundraiser for the Terre Hill Park and has become a holiday-time staple for the community and outsiders. During Christmas in the Park, the Terre Hill Park is converted into a Christmas wonderland. Lights, live music, food, entertainment, and more fill the Park. People from near and far have attended, some even traveling across state lines just to experience the festive event.

== Terre Hill in popular culture ==
In 1980, Calvin Trillin wrote a humorous article in The New Yorker about a dispute between the fire company of Terre Hill and its ladies' auxiliary.
