= Fredericksville, Pennsylvania =

Unincorporated community in Pennsylvania, US

- Unincorporated community
- Location within Pennsylvania
- Coordinates: 40°27′11″N 75°41′21″W
- Country: United States
- State: Pennsylvania
- County: Berks
- Township: Rockland
- Elevation: 1,056 ft (322 m)
- Time zone: UTC-5 (Eastern (EST))
  - Summer (DST): UTC-4 (EDT)
- Area codes: 610 and 484
- GNIS feature ID: 1203626

Fredericksville is an unincorporated community in Rockland Township in Berks County, Pennsylvania, United States. Fredericksville is located at the intersection of Fredericksville and Five Points Roads.

== History ==
A post office called Fredericksville was established in 1853, and remained in operation until 1911. The community was named for David Frederick, the owner of a local tavern.
