= East Earl, Pennsylvania =

Unincorporated community in Pennsylvania, US

- Census-designated place
- Location within Pennsylvania Location within the United States
- Coordinates: 40°06′36″N 76°01′57″W
- Country: United States
- State: Pennsylvania
- County: Lancaster
- Township: East Earl

Area
  - Total: 0.94 sq mi (2.44 km^{2})
  - Land: 0.94 sq mi (2.44 km^{2})
  - Water: 0.0039 sq mi (0.01 km^{2})
- Elevation: 512 ft (156 m)

Population (2020)
  - Total: 1,113
  - Density: 1,180/sq mi (457/km^{2})
- Time zone: UTC-5 (Eastern (EST))
  - Summer (DST): UTC-4 (EDT)
- ZIP code: 17519
- Area code: 717
- FIPS code: 42-21064
- GNIS feature ID: 1173799

East Earl is an unincorporated community and census-designated place (CDP) in East Earl Township, Lancaster County, Pennsylvania, United States. As of the 2010 census, it had a population of 1,144.

== Geography ==
East Earl is in northeastern Lancaster County, in the south-central part of East Earl Township. It is bordered to the northwest by Blue Ball. U.S. Route 322 (Division Highway) passes through East Earl, leading northwest 9 miles (14 km) to Ephrata and southeast 20 miles (32 km) to Downingtown. Pennsylvania Route 897 (Springville Road) leads south 11 miles (18 km) to Gap and north 10 miles (16 km) to Swartzville. Lancaster, the county seat, is 16 miles (26 km) to the southwest.

According to the U.S. Census Bureau, the East Earl CDP has a total area of 0.93 square miles (2.4 km^{2}), of which 1.6 acres (6,524 m^{2}), or 0.27%, are water. The community drains northeast and northwest to the Conestoga River and southwest to Mill Creek, a tributary of the Conestoga.

== Demographics ==
Historical population
Census	Pop.	Note	%±
2020	1,113		—
U.S. Decennial Census

== See also ==
- Shady Maple Smorgasbord
