= Pennsylvania Route 340 =

State highway in Pennsylvania, US

Pennsylvania Route 340

Route information
- Maintained by PennDOT
- Length: 30.064 mi (48.383 km)

Major junctions
- West end: PA 462 near Lancaster
- US 30 near Lancaster; PA 896 in Smoketown; PA 772 in Intercourse; PA 897 in White Horse; PA 10 in Compass; PA 82 near Coatesville; US 30 near Thorndale
- East end: US 30 Bus. in Thorndale

Location
- Country: United States
- State: Pennsylvania
- Counties: Lancaster, Chester

Highway system
- Pennsylvania State Route System; Interstate; US; State; Scenic; Legislative
← PA 339	→ PA 341

Pennsylvania Route 340 (PA 340) is a 30-mile-long (48 km) state highway located in Lancaster and Chester counties in Pennsylvania. The western terminus is at PA 462 in Lancaster. The eastern terminus is at U.S. Route 30 Business (US 30 Bus.) in Thorndale. The route is a two-lane road passing through rural areas, heading through the Pennsylvania Dutch Country in eastern Lancaster County that is home to several Amish families and rural areas in western Chester County, serving the communities of Bird-in-Hand, Intercourse, White Horse, Compass, and Wagontown. PA 340 intersects US 30 near Lancaster, PA 772 in Intercourse, PA 897 in White Horse, PA 10 in Compass, PA 82 near Coatesville, and US 30 again near Thorndale.

The route follows the route of the King's Highway that linked Lancaster and Philadelphia in colonial times and is, in fact, named King's Highway during the first few miles of its length near Thorndale. PA 340 was first designated in 1928 between US 222/PA 240 east of Lancaster and US 30/PA 1 in Gap, following its current route to White Horse before turning south to Gap. In 1937, the route was extended east to US 30 in Coatesville by heading east along its current route to Wagontown and turning south to Coatesville, with PA 897 replacing the former route between White Horse and Gap. By 1940, the route was extended west to US 22 in Harrisburg, heading west to Marietta, north to Hershey, northwest to Union Deposit, and west to Harrisburg. PA 340 was rerouted to end at US 30 in Thorndale during the 1940s. In the 1950s, the west end was cut back to US 422 in Hershey. The western terminus was scaled back to PA 441 in Marietta by 1962 and its current location by 1970, with the former alignment now PA 743 between Hershey and Marietta and PA 23 between Marietta and Lancaster.

== Route description ==
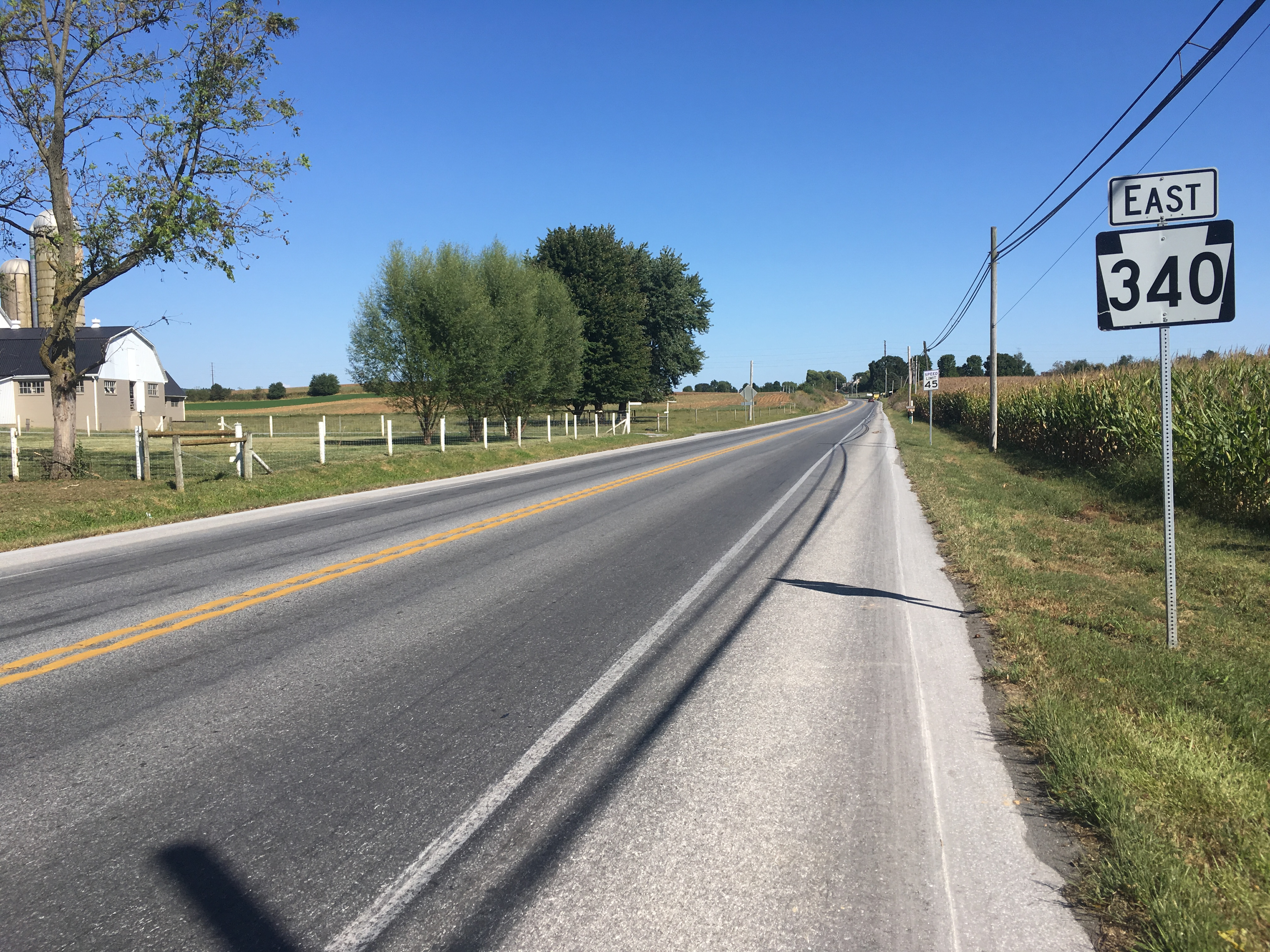
PA 340 eastbound in Leacock Township

PA 340 begins at an intersection with PA 462 in the community of Bridgeport in East Lampeter Township, Lancaster County, heading east on two-lane undivided Old Philadelphia Pike. The road runs through areas of homes and businesses, passing south of the Harrisburg Area Community College Lancaster Campus before briefly forming the border between the city of Lancaster to the north and East Lampeter Township to the south. Farther east, the route heads between industrial parks to the north and neighborhoods to the south before coming to a partial interchange with the US 30 freeway that does not have a ramp from westbound US 30 to PA 340. Past this interchange, PA 340 runs through less dense areas of residential and commercial development with some farm fields. At this point, the route enters the Pennsylvania Dutch Country of eastern Lancaster County, which is home to many Amish farms and businesses catering to tourists. The road enters the community of Smoketown and intersects the northern terminus of PA 896 to the south of Smoketown Airport. The route crosses Mill Creek and continues east to the community of Bird-in-Hand, where it passes under Amtrak's Keystone Corridor railroad line.

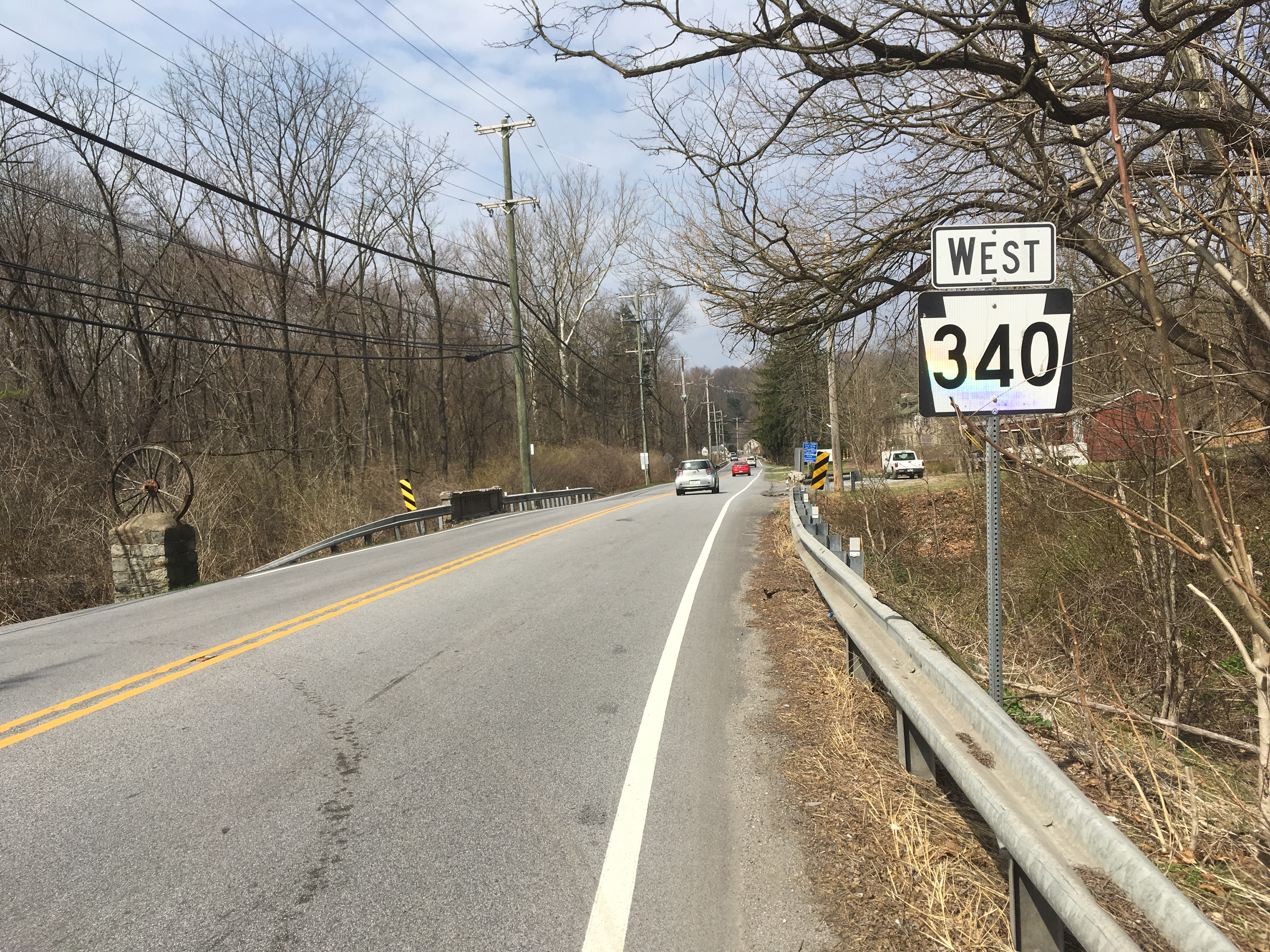
PA 340 westbound past PA 82 north of Coatesville

PA 340 enters Leacock Township and runs through open agricultural land with occasional residences. The road heads into the community of Intercourse and passes homes and businesses. PA 340 intersects PA 772 and forms a concurrency with that route on Main Street, with the road gaining a center left-turn lane. PA 772 splits to the southeast and PA 340 passes more residential development on Old Philadelphia Pike. The road leaves Intercourse and loses the turn lane, continuing through more farmland. The route heads into Salisbury Township and runs through more rural areas, passing through the community of Spring Garden. PA 340 comes to an intersection with PA 897 and runs concurrent with that route before PA 897 turns south in the community of White Horse. Following this, the road runs east through more areas of farm fields, crossing Pequea Creek and passing through the community of Cains.

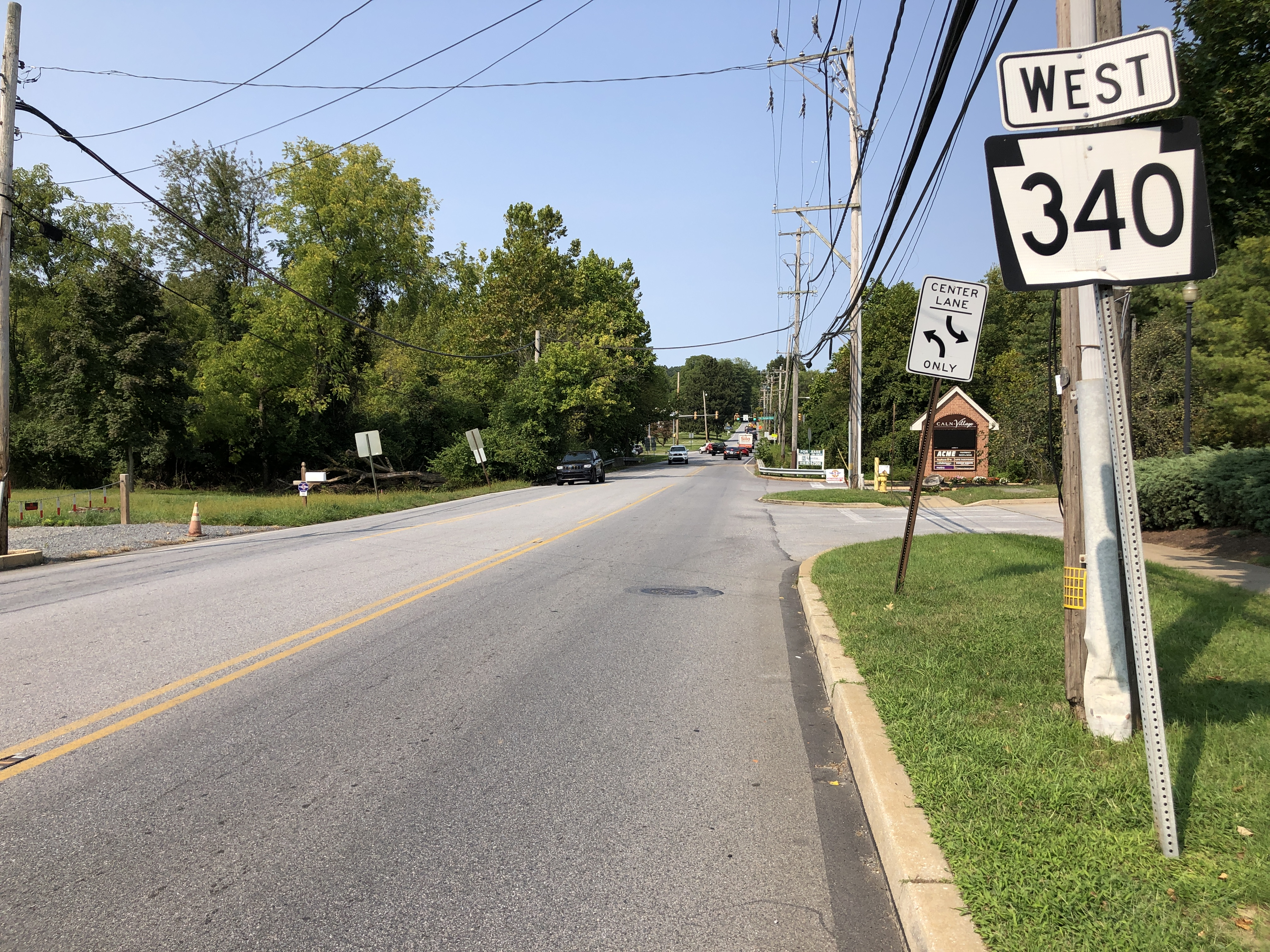
PA 340 westbound past US 30 Bus. in Caln Township

PA 340 enters West Caln Township in Chester County and becomes West Kings Highway, passing southeast through woods and fields and reaching an intersection with PA 10 in the community of Compass. At this point, PA 10 turns southeast for a brief concurrency with PA 340 before PA 340 splits to the east. The road runs through wooded areas with some homes and fields, passing through the community of Wagontown. The route curves southeast before running east again and becoming the border between West Caln Township to the north and the city of Coatesville to the south. PA 340 crosses the West Branch Brandywine Creek and runs along the border between West Brandywine Township to the north and Coatesville to the south as it comes to the junction with PA 82 in the community of Siousca.

Following this intersection, the road becomes East Kings Highway and runs along the border between West Brandywine Township to the north and Valley Township to the south as it runs through forested areas with some homes. The route enters Caln Township and heads southeast, passing over the US 30 freeway. PA 340 intersects Reeceville Road/North Caln Road, with Reeceville Road heading north to an interchange with US 30. The road curves northeast and comes to another bridge over US 30. The route passes through more wooded areas with some homes and fields, as well as Caln Meeting House, turning east onto Bondsville Road. PA 340 runs through forested areas and makes a turn to the south, coming to a diamond interchange with US 30. The route runs through wooded areas of residential development and comes to its eastern terminus at an intersection with US 30 Bus. (Lincoln Highway) in the community of Thorndale. Past this intersection, the road continues as Marshallton Road, which is an unsigned quadrant route designated State Route 3055.

== History ==
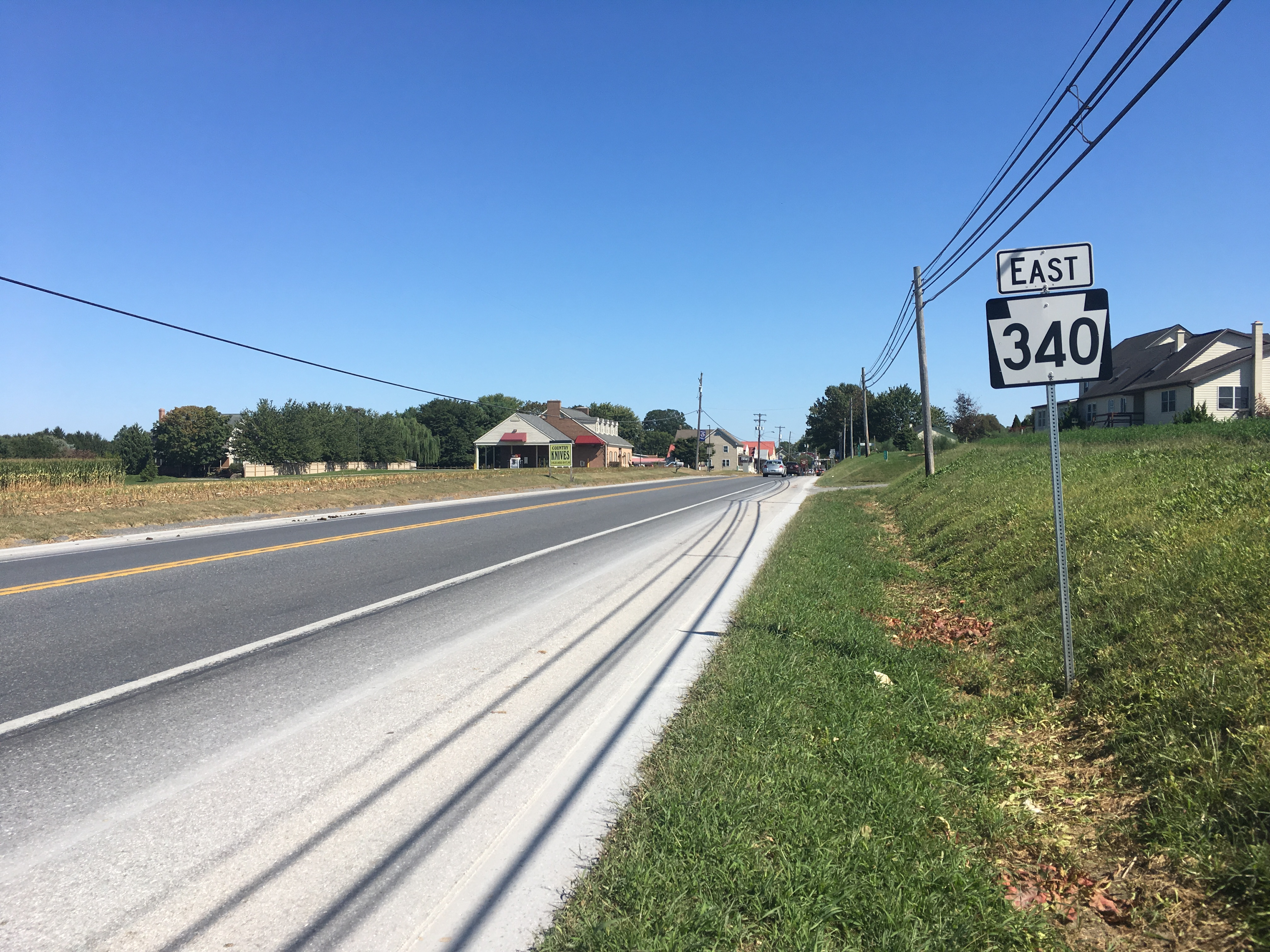
PA 340 eastbound entering Intercourse

The route follows the alignment of the King's Highway, a colonial road built in 1733 that linked Lancaster and Philadelphia. The road was laid out by the provincial government of Pennsylvania along what was once known as "Old Peter's Road," a trade route used by the French-Canadian fur trader Peter Bisaillon (1662-1742). Bisaillon's route probably followed even older Indian trails. When Pennsylvania first legislated routes in 1911, what would become PA 340 was legislated as Legislative Route 142, which ran from Lancaster to White Horse before turning south to Gap. By 1926, Legislative Route 142 was paved. PA 340 was assigned in 1928 to the alignment extending from US 222/PA 240 (Horseshoe Road) east of Lancaster to US 30/PA 1 in Gap via White Horse. US 222/PA 240 was designated along the current alignment west to US 30/PA 1 (now PA 462) while the current route east of White Horse existed as an unpaved road with small paved sections west of PA 82 and north of Thorndale. In 1937, the eastern terminus was rerouted at White Horse to head east to US 30 (now US 30 Bus.) in Coatesville, following its current alignment east to Wagontown before following Wagontown Road to Coatesville, with an extended PA 897 replacing the former PA 340 designation between White Horse and Gap. By 1940, the western terminus was extended to US 22 (Herr Street) east of Harrisburg, following its current alignment (which replaced US 222) to US 30, which it ran concurrent with through Lancaster. From here, PA 340 headed west to Marietta, where it formed a concurrency with PA 441 before making a turn to the north and continuing through Elizabethtown to Hershey. At Hershey, PA 340 turned to the northwest and continued to Union Deposit, where it headed west toward Harrisburg. At this time, the entire length of PA 340 was paved. In the 1940s, the eastern terminus of PA 340 was rerouted to its current location at US 30 (now US 30 Bus.) in Thorndale.

The western terminus of PA 340 was cut back to US 422 in Hershey in the 1950s, with the former route between Harrisburg and Hershey becoming unnumbered Union Deposit Road, Hockersville Road, and Fishburn Road. By 1962, the western terminus of PA 340 was cut back PA 441 in Marietta, with an extended PA 743 replacing the route between Hershey and Marietta. The western terminus was truncated to its current location at PA 462 by 1970, with PA 23 extended west to replace the former designation between Marietta and Lancaster.

== Major intersections ==
County	Location	mi	km	Destinations	Notes
Lancaster	East Lampeter Township	0.000	0.000	PA 462	Western terminus
Lancaster	East Lampeter Township	1.351	2.174	US 30 – York, Harrisburg, Coatesville, Philadelphia	Interchange; no access from US 30 west
Lancaster	East Lampeter Township	3.820	6.148	PA 896 south (Eastbrook Road) to US 30 – Strasburg	Northern terminus of PA 896
Lancaster	Leacock Township	8.521	13.713	PA 772 west (Newport Road)	Western end of PA 772 concurrency
Lancaster	Leacock Township	8.704	14.008	PA 772 east (East Newport Road)	Eastern end of PA 772 concurrency
Lancaster	Salisbury Township	13.896	22.363	PA 897 north (Springville Road)	Western end of PA 897 concurrency
Lancaster	Salisbury Township	14.422	23.210	PA 897 south (White Horse Road) – Gap	Eastern end of PA 897 concurrency
Chester	West Caln Township	17.680	28.453	PA 10 north (Compass Road) – Honey Brook	Western end of PA 10 concurrency
Chester	West Caln Township	17.828	28.691	PA 10 south – Parkesburg	Eastern end of PA 10 concurrency
Chester	Coatesville–Valley Township line	24.604	39.596	PA 82 – Brandywine Manor, Coatesville	
Chester	Caln Township	29.248	47.070	US 30 – Exton, Coatesville	Interchange
Chester	Caln Township	30.064	48.383	US 30 Bus. (Lincoln Highway) – Downingtown, Coatesville	Eastern terminus
1.000 mi = 1.609 km; 1.000 km = 0.621 mi: Concurrency terminus

== PA 340 Alternate Truck ==
PA Route 340 Alternate Truck
- Location: Chester County
- Length: 9.3 mi (15.0 km)
- Existed: 2021–present

Pennsylvania Route 340 Alternate Truck is a truck route that bypasses a weight-restricted bridge over the West Branch Brandywine Creek, on which trucks over 21 tons and combination loads over 25 tons are prohibited. The route follows PA 10, US 30, and PA 82 through the western portions of Chester County, Pennsylvania. The route was signed in 2021.
