= Witmer, Pennsylvania =

Unincorporated community in Pennsylvania, US

- census-designated place
- Location in Pennsylvania Location in the United States
- Coordinates: 40°02′53″N 76°12′41″W
- Country: United States
- State: Pennsylvania
- County: Lancaster
- Township: East Lampeter

Area
  - Total: 1.24 sq mi (3.22 km^{2})
  - Land: 1.24 sq mi (3.22 km^{2})
  - Water: 0 sq mi (0.0 km^{2})
- Elevation: 400 ft (120 m)

Population (2010)
  - Total: 492
  - Density: 396/sq mi (152.8/km^{2})
- Time zone: UTC-5 (Eastern (EST))
  - Summer (DST): UTC-4 (EDT)
- ZIP code: 17585
- Area code: 717
- FIPS code: 42-85968
- GNIS feature ID: 1191637

Witmer is an unincorporated community and census-designated place (CDP) in East Lampeter Township, Lancaster County, Pennsylvania, United States. As of the 2010 census, the population was 492.

== Geography ==
Witmer is in central Lancaster County, in the eastern part of East Lampeter Township. It is bordered to the south by Smoketown and to the northeast by Upper Leacock Township. It is 0.6 miles (1.0 km) north of Pennsylvania Route 340 and 6 miles (10 km) east of Lancaster, the county seat.

According to the U.S. Census Bureau, the Witmer CDP has a total area of 1.2 square miles (3.2 km^{2}), of which 0.9 acres (3,811 m^{2}), or 0.12%, are water. The community drains west to Stauffer Run and east to Mill Creek, both tributaries of the Conestoga River, flowing southwest to the Susquehanna.
