= Smoketown, Pennsylvania =

Unincorporated community in Pennsylvania, US

- Census-designated place
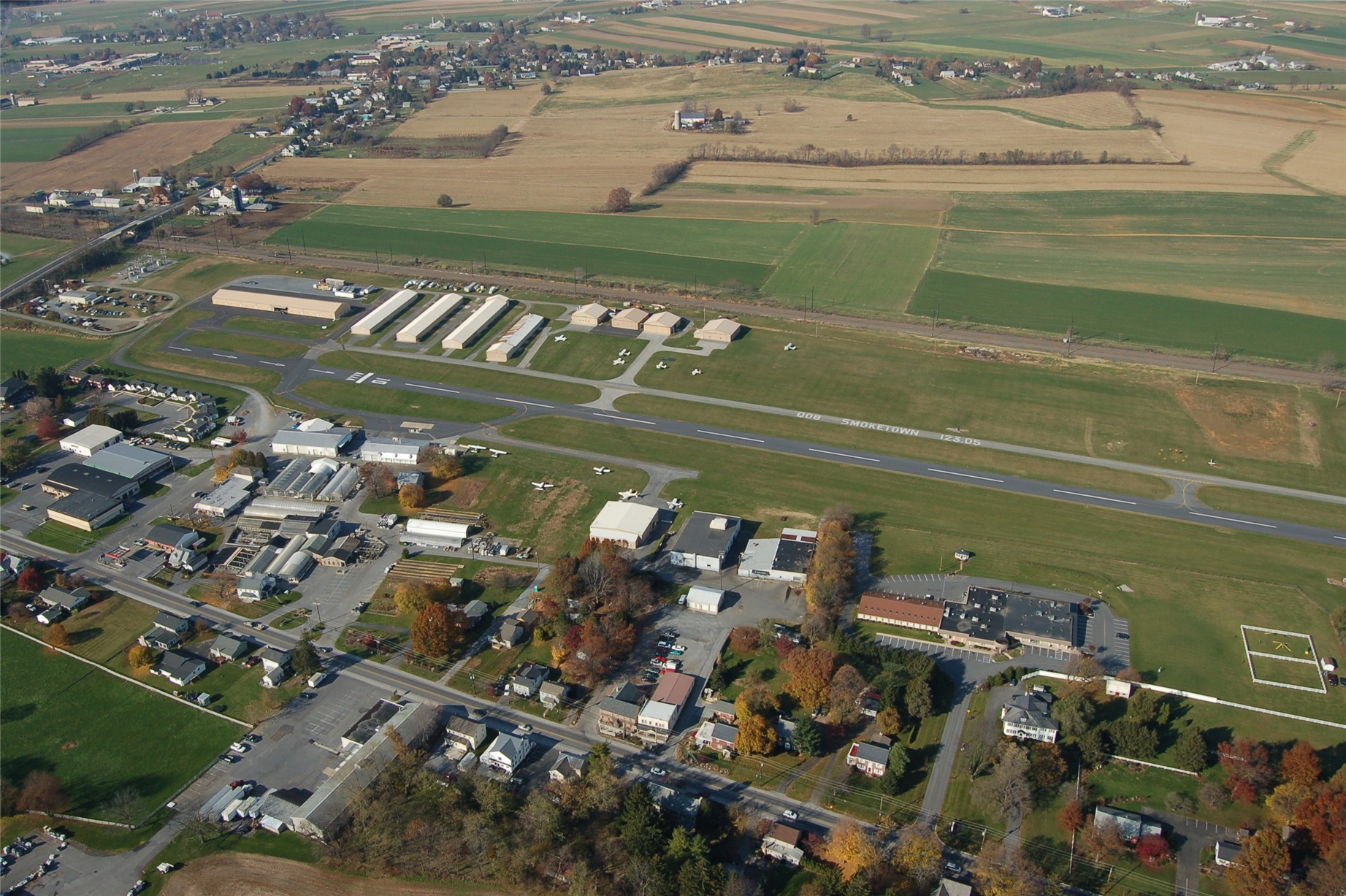
- A view of Smoketown, including the Smoketown Airport

- Location in Pennsylvania Location in the United States
- Coordinates: 40°2′21″N 76°11′59″W
- Country: United States
- State: Pennsylvania
- County: Lancaster
- Township: East Lampeter

Area
  - Total: 0.58 sq mi (1.50 km^{2})
  - Land: 0.57 sq mi (1.48 km^{2})
  - Water: 0.0077 sq mi (0.02 km^{2})
- Elevation: 358 ft (109 m)

Population (2010)
  - Total: 357
  - Density: 623/sq mi (240.5/km^{2})
- Time zone: UTC-5 (Eastern (EST))
  - Summer (DST): UTC-4 (EDT)
- ZIP code: 17576
- Area code: 717
- FIPS code: 42-71504
- GNIS feature ID: 1198301

Smoketown is an unincorporated village and census-designated place (CDP) in East Lampeter Township, Pennsylvania, United States. Also known as Smoke Town, it is served by the Smoketown Airport. As of the 2010 census, it had a population of 357.

== Geography ==
Smoketown is in east-central Lancaster County, in the eastern part of East Lampeter Township, at the intersection of Pennsylvania Route 340 (Old Philadelphia Pike) and Pennsylvania Route 896 (Eastbrook Road). It is bordered to the east by Bird-in-Hand and to the north by Witmer. PA 340 leads west 5 miles (8 km) to Lancaster, the county seat, and east the same distance to Intercourse, while PA 896 leads south 1 mile (2 km) to U.S. Route 30 (the Lincoln Highway) and 4 miles (6 km) to Strasburg.

According to the U.S. Census Bureau, the Smoketown CDP has a total area of 0.58 square miles (1.5 km^{2}), of which 0.01 square miles (0.02 km^{2}), or 1.29%, are water. Mill Creek, a southwestward-flowing tributary of the Conestoga River, forms the eastern border of Smoketown and separates it from Bird-in-Hand. Via the Conestoga River, the communities are part of the Susquehanna River watershed.

== Demographics ==
As of the 2000 census, Smoketown had a population of 119 in an area of 0.1 square mile. Of the population, 115 were white, and 4 belonged to two or more races. There were 47 housing units, making the average household size 2.53 people.
