= Sadsbury Township, Lancaster County, Pennsylvania =

Township in Pennsylvania, US

Coordinates: 39°52′24″N 75°59′29″W

Salisbury Township, Lancaster County, Pennsylvania
- Township
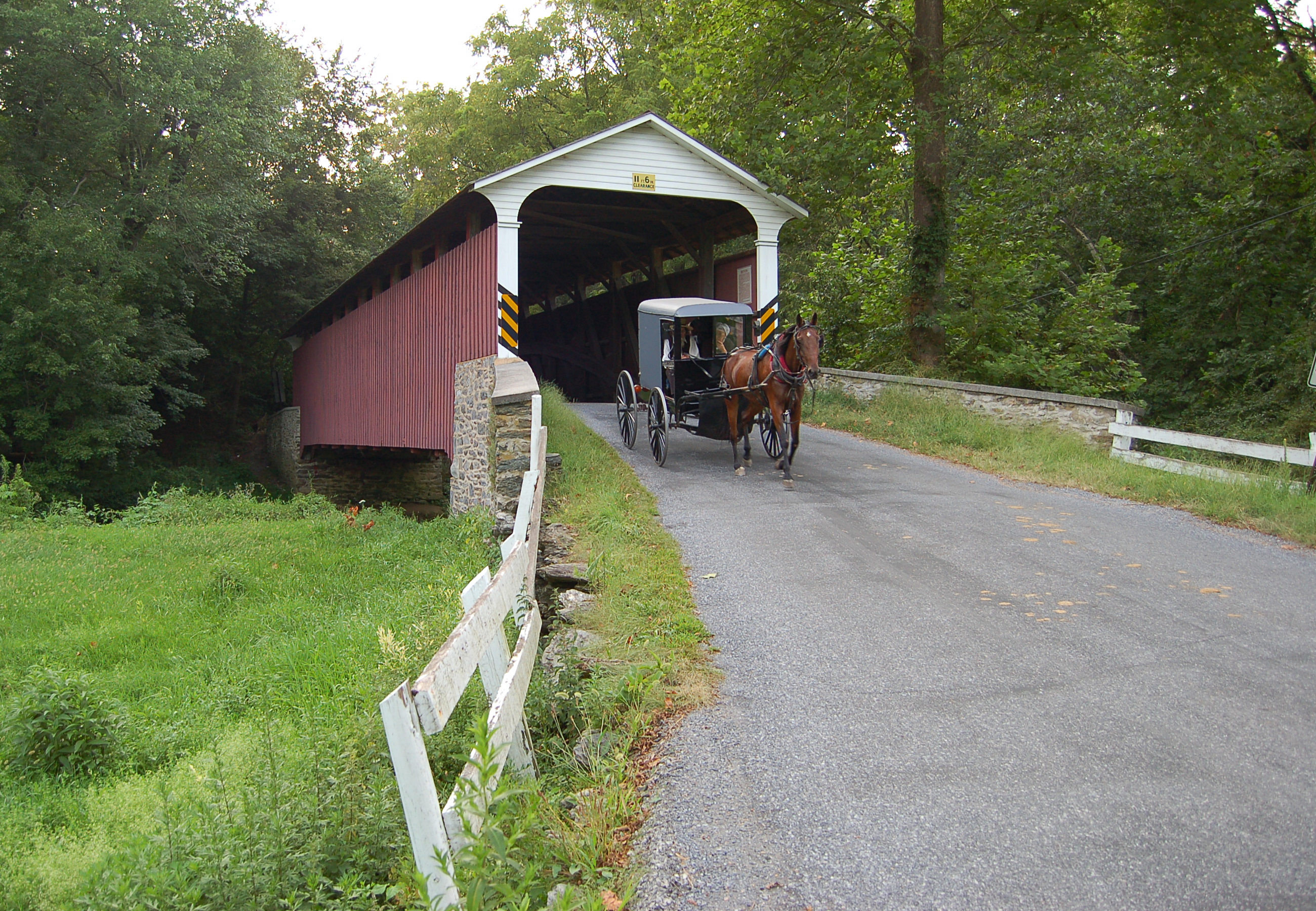
- Mercer's Mill Covered Bridge on the Chester County border in Salisbury Township.

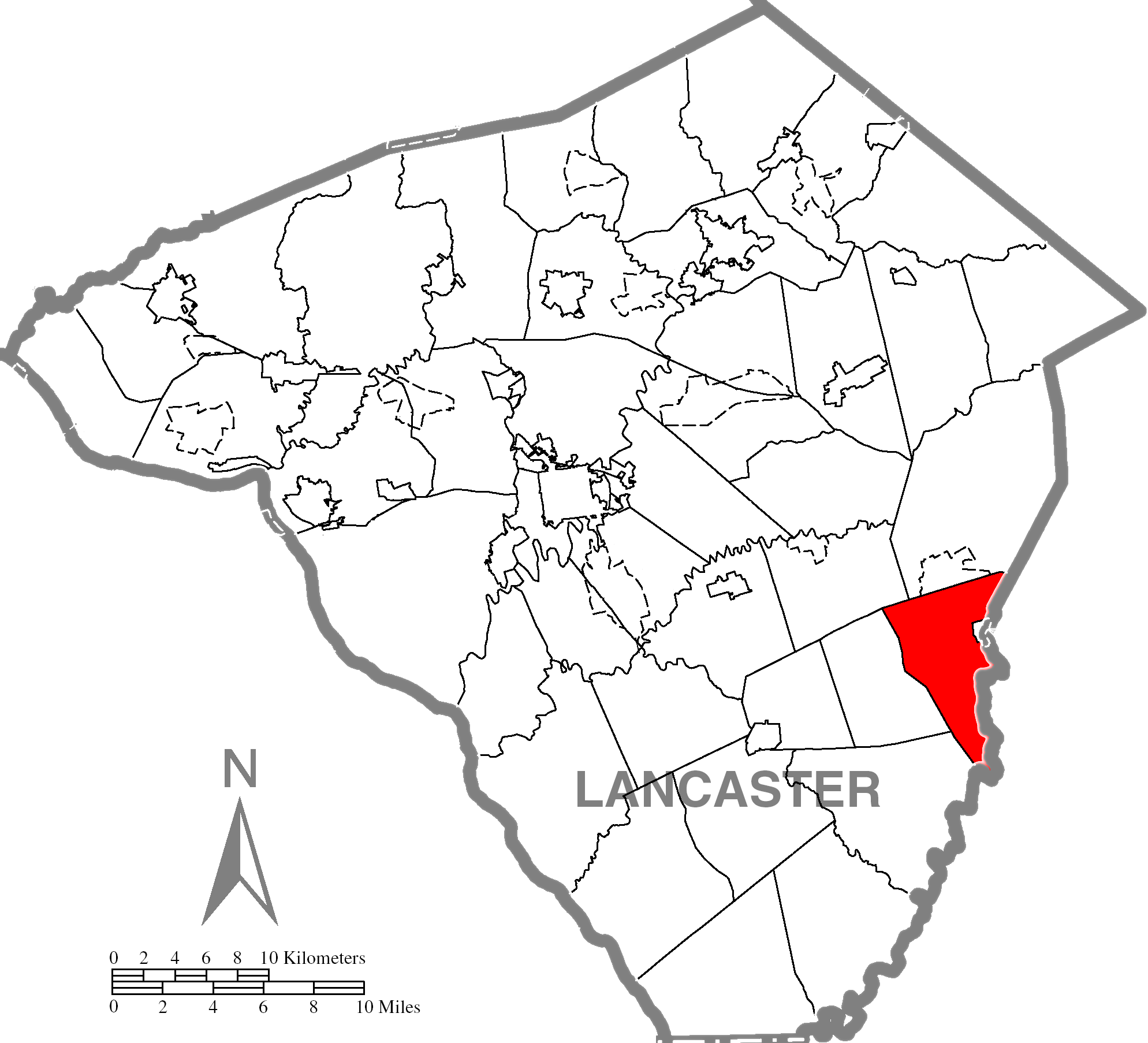
- Map of Lancaster County highlighting Sadsbury Township
- Country: United States
- State: Pennsylvania
- County: Lancaster
- Settled: 1691
- Incorporated: 1729

Government
  - Type: Board of Supervisors

Area
  - Total: 19.66 sq mi (50.92 km^{2})
  - Land: 19.56 sq mi (50.66 km^{2})
  - Water: 0.10 sq mi (0.26 km^{2})

Population (2020)
  - Total: 3,547 ▲
  - Estimate (2021): 3,529
  - Density: 178.4/sq mi (68.89/km^{2})
- Time zone: UTC-5 (Eastern (EST))
  - Summer (DST): UTC-4 (EDT)
- Area codes: 610, 717
- FIPS code: 42-071-67096
- Website: www.sadsburytownshiplancaster.org

Sadsbury Township is a township in east central Lancaster County, Pennsylvania, United States. The population was 3,547 at the 2020 census.

== History ==
In 1744, Sadsbury Township was split into two; the western part was organized as Bart Township and the eastern part remained Sadsbury Township.

The Mercer's Mill Covered Bridge was listed on the National Register of Historic Places in 1980.

== Politics ==
Sadsbury township vote by party in presidential elections
Year	Democratic	Republican	Third Parties
2020	24.45% 300	74.25% 911	1.30% 16
2016	25.58% 253	70.58% 698	3.84% 38
2012	29.69% 288	68.56% 665	1.75% 17
2008	36.19% 350	61.74% 597	2.07% 20
2004	29.39% 293	70.21% 700	0.40% 4
2000	30.41% 243	64.46% 515	5.13% 41
1996	29.97% 211	59.80% 421	10.23% 72
1992	30.42% 209	51.82% 356	17.76% 122
1988	29.35% 162	70.65% 390	0.00% 0
1984	25.04% 144	74.61% 429	0.35% 2
1980	27.78% 135	64.81% 315	7.41% 36
1976	34.27% 147	64.57% 277	1.17% 5
1972	15.32% 68	28.60% 127	56.08% 249
1968	25.43% 89	62.28% 218	12.29% 43
1964	50.29% 172	49.71% 170	0.00% 0
1960	31.10% 107	68.90% 237	0.00% 0
1956	32.99% 97	67.01% 197	0.00% 0
1952	26.92% 70	73.08% 190	0.00% 0
1948	31.58% 60	67.37% 128	1.05% 2
1944	32.16% 73	67.84% 154	0.00% 0
1940	44.89% 123	55.11% 151	0.00% 0
1936	52.75% 182	46.96% 162	0.29% 1
1932	39.36% 98	60.64% 151	0.00% 0
1928	15.35% 35	84.65% 193	0.00% 0
1924	19.71% 54	80.29% 220	0.00% 0
1920	17.22% 26	75.50% 114	7.28% 11
1916	37.10% 46	61.29% 76	1.61% 2
1912	28.13% 45	34.38% 55	37.50% 60
1908	28.04% 60	69.63% 149	2.34% 5
1904	27.41% 54	70.05% 138	0.25% 5

== Media ==
WNUZ-LP 92.9 FM - Community Radio Station, Based in the Gap area of Sadsbury Township, which is located in the northeastern corner of the Township.

== Geography ==
According to the United States Census Bureau, the township has a total area of 19.7 square miles (51.1 km^{2}), all land. Unincorporated communities in the township include Simmonstown, Smyrna, and Coopersville.

== Demographics ==
Historical population
Census	Pop.	Note	%±
2000	3,025		—
2010	3,395		12.2%
2020	3,547		4.5%
2021 (est.)	3,529		−0.5%
U.S. Decennial Census

As of the census of 2000, there were 3,025 people, 880 households, and 760 families living in the township. The population density was 153.4 inhabitants per square mile (59.2/km^{2}). There were 899 housing units at an average density of 45.6 per square mile (17.6/km^{2}). The racial makeup of the township was 99.01% White, 0.26% African American, 0.07% Native American, 0.33% Asian, and 0.33% from two or more races. Hispanic or Latino of any race were 0.40% of the population.

There were 880 households, out of which 44.1% had children under the age of 18 living with them, 78.5% were married couples living together, 4.4% had a female householder with no husband present, and 13.6% were non-families. 11.6% of all households were made up of individuals, and 5.0% had someone living alone who was 65 years of age or older. The average household size was 3.44 and the average family size was 3.75.

In the township the population was spread out, with 35.5% under the age of 18, 9.1% from 18 to 24, 24.5% from 25 to 44, 21.4% from 45 to 64, and 9.6% who were 65 years of age or older. The median age was 30 years. For every 100 females, there were 100.1 males. For every 100 females age 18 and over, there were 102.8 males.

The median income for a household in the township was $53,750, and the median income for a family was $56,034. Males had a median income of $35,779 versus $29,545 for females. The per capita income for the township was $17,956. About 8.0% of families and 12.7% of the population were below the poverty line, including 21.0% of those under age 18 and 8.5% of those age 65 or over.
