= New Milltown, Pennsylvania =

Unincorporated community in Pennsylvania, US

Coordinates: 40°01′15″N 76°03′32″W

New Milltown is a historic stone mill and unincorporated community located in Salisbury Township, Lancaster County, Pennsylvania, United States.

== History ==
While almost all previous mills in Lancaster County were located on the Conestoga River, New Milltown is called New Mill Town because it was the location of the first mill on Pequea Creek. On January 21, 1733 (Warrant, A-12-98, Philadelphia) Samuel Blyth received the original grant on the Pequea Creek (in Salisbury, Leacock, and Paradise Townships) and quickly built a mill there. Blyth's Mill is first documented on September 6, 1744 when Blyth filed a petition that requested a road to be built from Francis Jones' land (Gap) to Blyth's Mill (D-2-35). This is the section of Newport Road which now runs between Intercourse and Gap. Samuel may have operated a mill on the site as early as 1734.

The present stone mill at this location was probably first built by John Huston (Houston) circa 1750. On May 15, 1792 (Deed, PP1–221) Christian Hess (I) purchased the grist, saw and merchant mills. The assessment list of 1790 lists Christian Hess as owner. He probably was operating the mill for Samuel Huston, who had problems in clearing his ownership because of mortgage money owed to his family. Christian was born February 26, 1751, the son of John and Susanna (Landis) Hess. His wife Anna was the daughter of the well-known Mennonite Bishop Valentine Metzler. He was an ordained minister as well, and very important in the history of the Mennonites in the area, as was his son (who was primarily responsible for building the school/meeting house in 1814/1815). Though Christian Hess (I) is usually given credit for building the current stone mill around 1800 by most authorities, it is likely that he just expanded the Huston mill. Some of these improvements might have been undertaken by his son and could have taken place as late as 1815.

Later owners of the mill have included: several generations of Hess; Jacob F. Hershey; Daniel Denlinger; various Hunseckers; Amos Fisher; and Ron Lieberman. The mill itself has been known by many names, but probably the most appropriate are: Hess' Mill and New Milltown Roller Mills.
