= Salisbury Township, Pennsylvania =

Salisbury Township is the name of some places in the U.S. state of Pennsylvania:

- Salisbury Township, Lancaster County, Pennsylvania
- Salisbury Township, Lehigh County, Pennsylvania
