= Pennsylvania Route 897 =

State highway in Pennsylvania, US

Pennsylvania Route 897

Route information
- Maintained by PennDOT
- Length: 41.678 mi (67.074 km)

Major junctions
- South end: US 30 in Gap
- PA 340 in White Horse; US 322 in East Earl Township; PA 23 in East Earl Township; PA 272 near Adamstown; PA 419 in Schaefferstown; PA 501 in Schaefferstown
- North end: US 422 in Lebanon

Location
- Country: United States
- State: Pennsylvania
- Counties: Lancaster, Lebanon

Highway system
- Pennsylvania State Route System; Interstate; US; State; Scenic; Legislative
← PA 896	→ PA 898

Pennsylvania Route 897 (PA 897) is a 41.7-mile-long (67.1 km) north–south route in eastern Pennsylvania, United States. The southern terminus is at an intersection with U.S. Route 30 (US 30) in Gap. The northern terminus is at US 422 on the eastern edge of Lebanon. The route is a two-lane undivided road its entire length. PA 897 is located in Lancaster and Lebanon counties. The route heads north from Gap through agricultural areas in the Pennsylvania Dutch Country in Lancaster County, passing through White Horse, Blue Ball, and Terre Hill before continuing northwest through the northern portion of the county. PA 897 continues into Lebanon County and heads west to Schaefferstown before turning northwest to Lebanon. PA 897 was first designated in 1928 to the road between Reinholds and Kleinfeltersville while the road between Gap and White Horse was designated as the easternmost portion of PA 340. PA 897 was extended to its current length in the 1930s, replacing the portion of PA 340 between Gap and White Horse that was rerouted.

== Route description ==
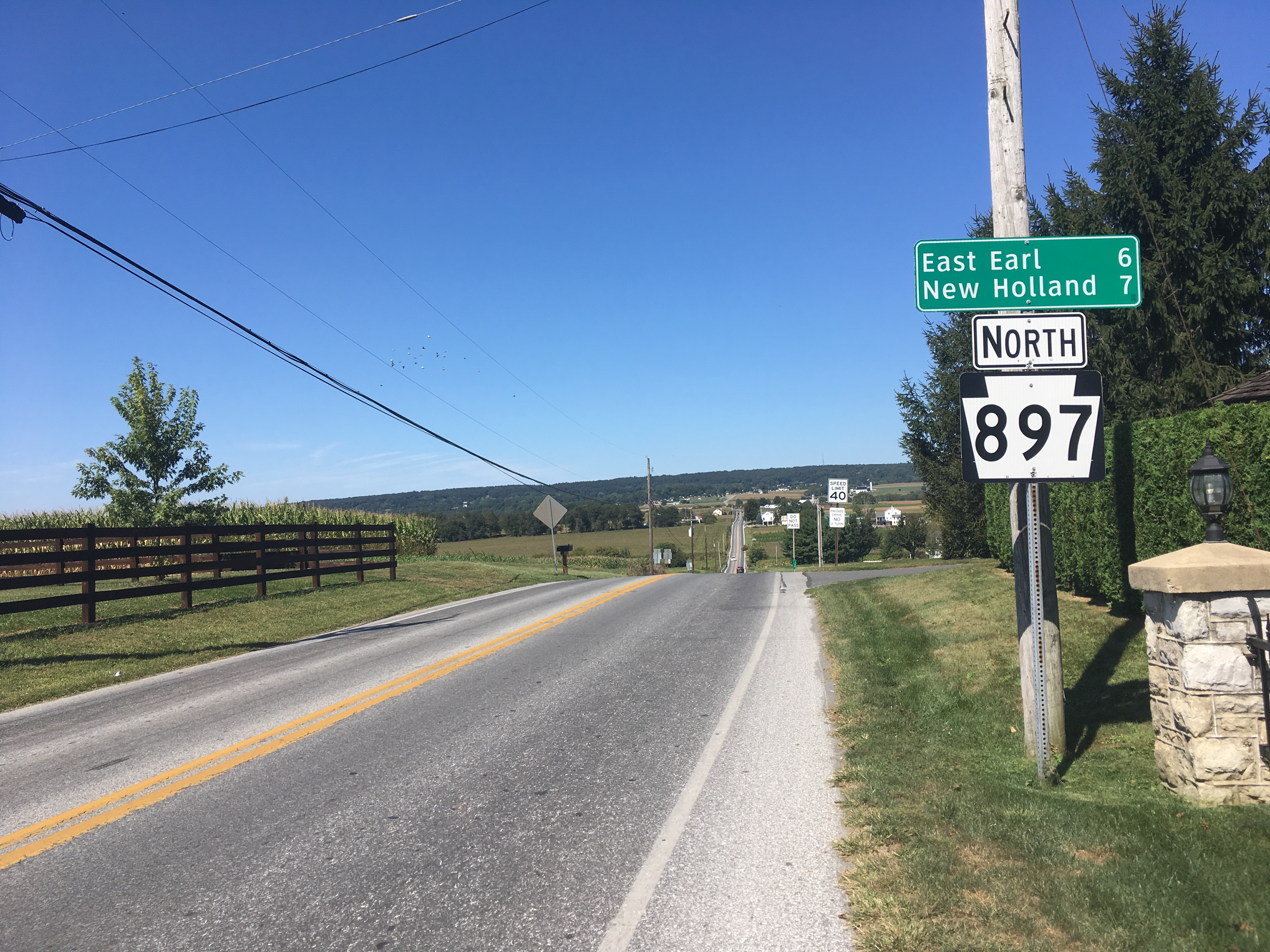
PA 897 northbound past PA 340 in White Horse

PA 897 begins at an intersection with US 30 (Lincoln Highway) in the community of Gap in Salisbury Township, Lancaster County, heading north on two-lane undivided White Horse Road. The route passes through the Pennsylvania Dutch Country of eastern Lancaster County, which is home to many Amish farms. The road heads northwest into agricultural areas with a few homes and turns to the northeast. The route continues through rural areas and make a brief turn northwest before continuing northeast. PA 897 makes another turn northwest, crossing Pequea Creek and heading through more farmland before it comes to an intersection with PA 340 in the community of White Horse, where it turns west to form a concurrency with that route along Old Philadelphia Pike. The road passes through farmland with some homes. PA 897 splits from PA 340 by heading north along Springville Road, running through more agricultural areas. The route curves northwest and reaches the community of Springville, where it turns northeast before heading north. The road runs through farmland before it briefly turns east and then heads north into wooded areas with some homes. PA 897 heads north over forested Welsh Mountain and crosses into East Earl Township. The road passes through residential development in the community of Cedar Lane before it comes to a junction with US 322. At this point, PA 897 turns west to briefly follow US 322 along 28th Division Highway before it splits to the north and resumes along Springville Road. The route runs past the Shady Maple Smorgasbord and the Shady Maple Farm Market before it reaches an intersection with PA 23 (Main Street) to the east of Blue Ball. PA 897 turns west to form a concurrency with PA 23 on Main Street, running between farmland to the north and development to the south.

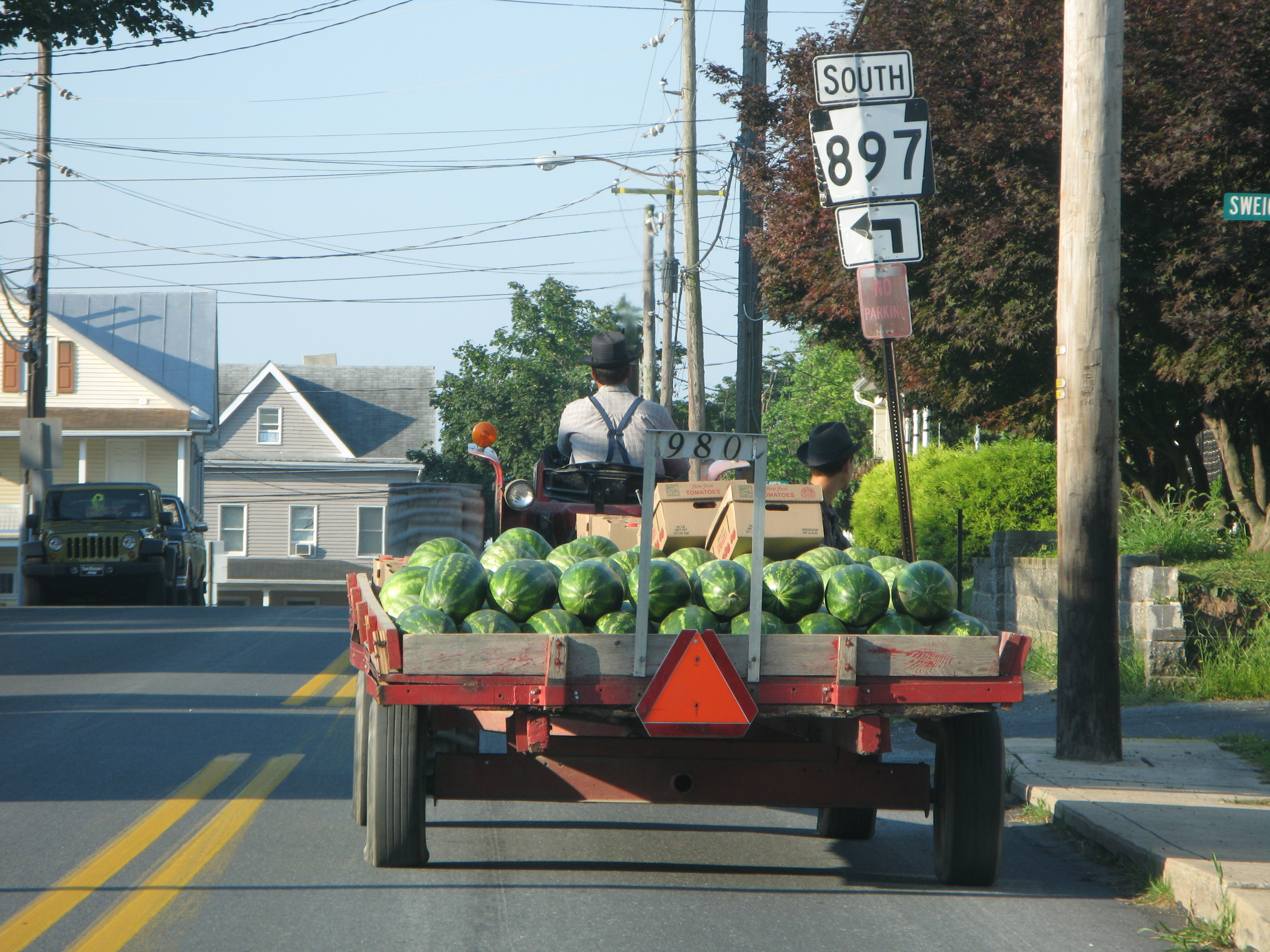
PA 897 south in Terre Hill

PA 897 splits from PA 23 by turning northwest onto Weaverland Valley Road, heading through agricultural areas with a few scattered homes. The road curves north as it passes to the east of a quarry and crosses the Conestoga River. The route continues through farmland with some residential and commercial development and turns east and then north to enter the borough of Terre Hill. Here, PA 897 becomes South Earl Street and passes homes, turning west onto East Main Street. The route curves northwest, becoming West Main Street at the Center Avenue intersection. The road passes more homes and a few businesses and turns north onto Broad Street before it leaves Terre Hill for East Earl Township again. PA 897 winds north through farmland with some woods and homes and crosses Muddy Creek into Brecknock Township. The route becomes Dry Tavern Road and passes through the residential community of Fivepointville before it runs through agricultural areas with some trees and homes. The road heads into wooded areas with some homes and comes to a bridge over the Pennsylvania Turnpike (Interstate 76). PA 897 runs northwest through more farms and woods with some development before it turns north and comes to a bridge over the US 222 freeway. The route curves northwest and crosses Little Muddy Creek into East Cocalico Township, where it becomes Swartzville Road and runs through a mix of farmland and residential subdivisions before reaching an intersection with PA 272 in the community of Swartzville. Past this intersection, the road heads north through a mix of farm fields, woods, and homes, turning to the northwest. PA 897 continues through rural land and crosses into West Cocalico Township. The route passes through the residential community of Reinholds on Main Street, where it crosses an East Penn Railroad line at-grade. The road becomes unnamed and winds northwest through a mix of farmland, woodland, and residential development, heading through the community of Blainsport. PA 897 continues west through agricultural areas with a few homes, passing through the community of Cocalico and crossing Cocalico Creek before it heads to the north of the Middle Creek Wildlife Management Area and runs through the northern corner of Clay Township.

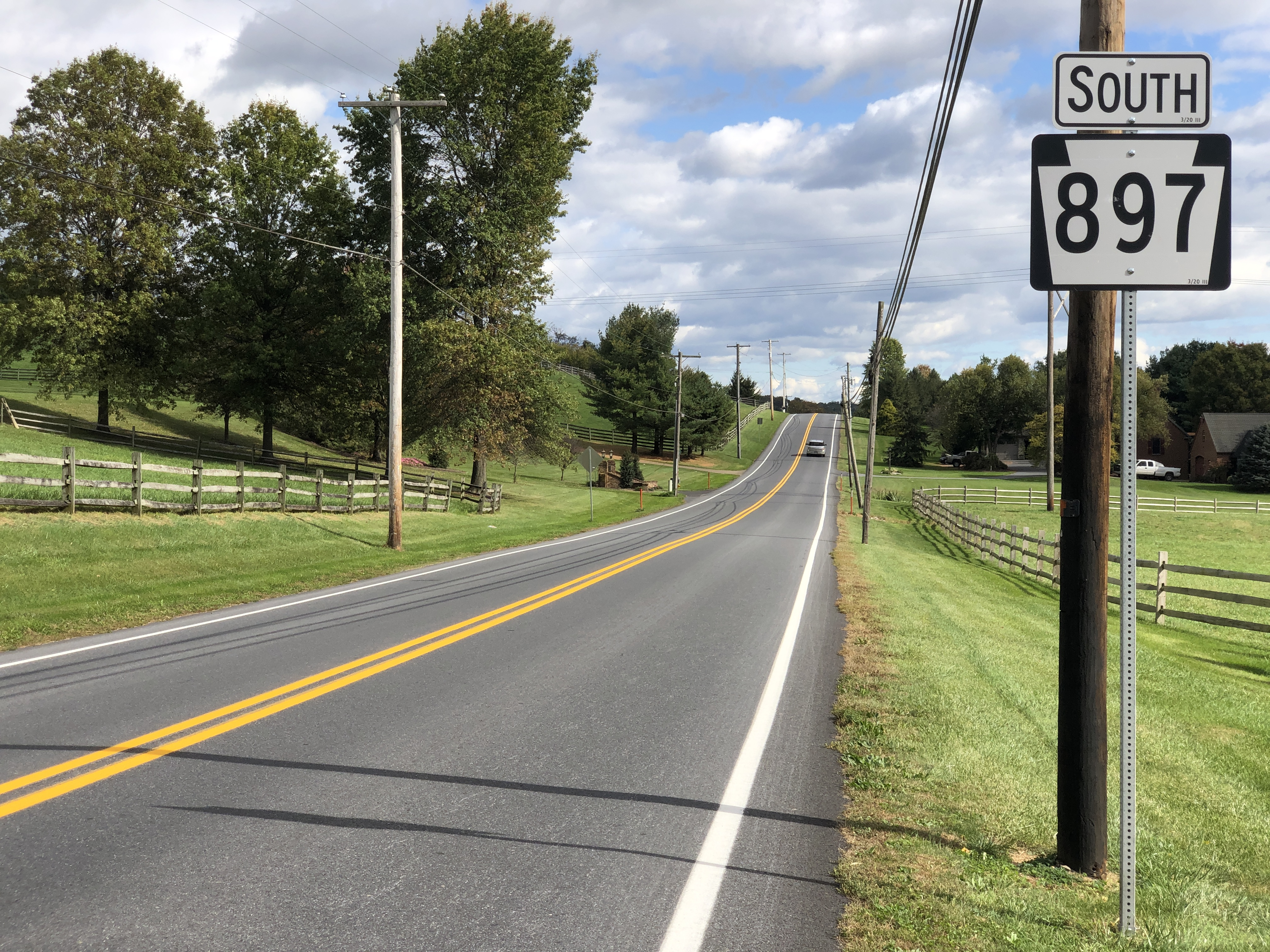
PA 897 southbound in Heidelberg Township

PA 897 enters Heidelberg Township in Lebanon County and becomes Heidelberg Avenue. The route passes through the southeastern portion of Lebanon County, which is home to an Amish community. It runs through a mix of farmland and woodland with some homes, continuing to the north of the wildlife area. The road curves northwest and reaches the residential community of Kleinfeltersville, where it turns to the west. The route continues through rural areas and reaches the community of Schaefferstown, where it passes homes. PA 897 intersects PA 419, at which point that route turns west to join PA 897 on Heidelberg Avenue. The road heads through residential areas with some businesses and crosses PA 501. At the western edge of Schaefferstown, PA 897 splits from PA 419 by heading northwest along South 5th Avenue, heading through agricultural areas with some homes. The road continues northwest and passes through the community of Flintville, where it enters South Lebanon Township. The route reaches the community of Iona, where it turns west. PA 897 passes more farms before it curves northwest through a cluster of residential development. The road passes through a mix of farmland and residential subdivisions prior to running through a mix of residential and commercial development. The route becomes the border between the city of Lebanon to the west and South Lebanon Township to the east and curves north through residential areas, coming to an intersection with the eastbound direction of US 422 (East Walnut Street). PA 897 continues past homes to its northern terminus at a junction with the westbound direction of US 422 (East Cumberland Street) in the community of Hebron.

== History ==
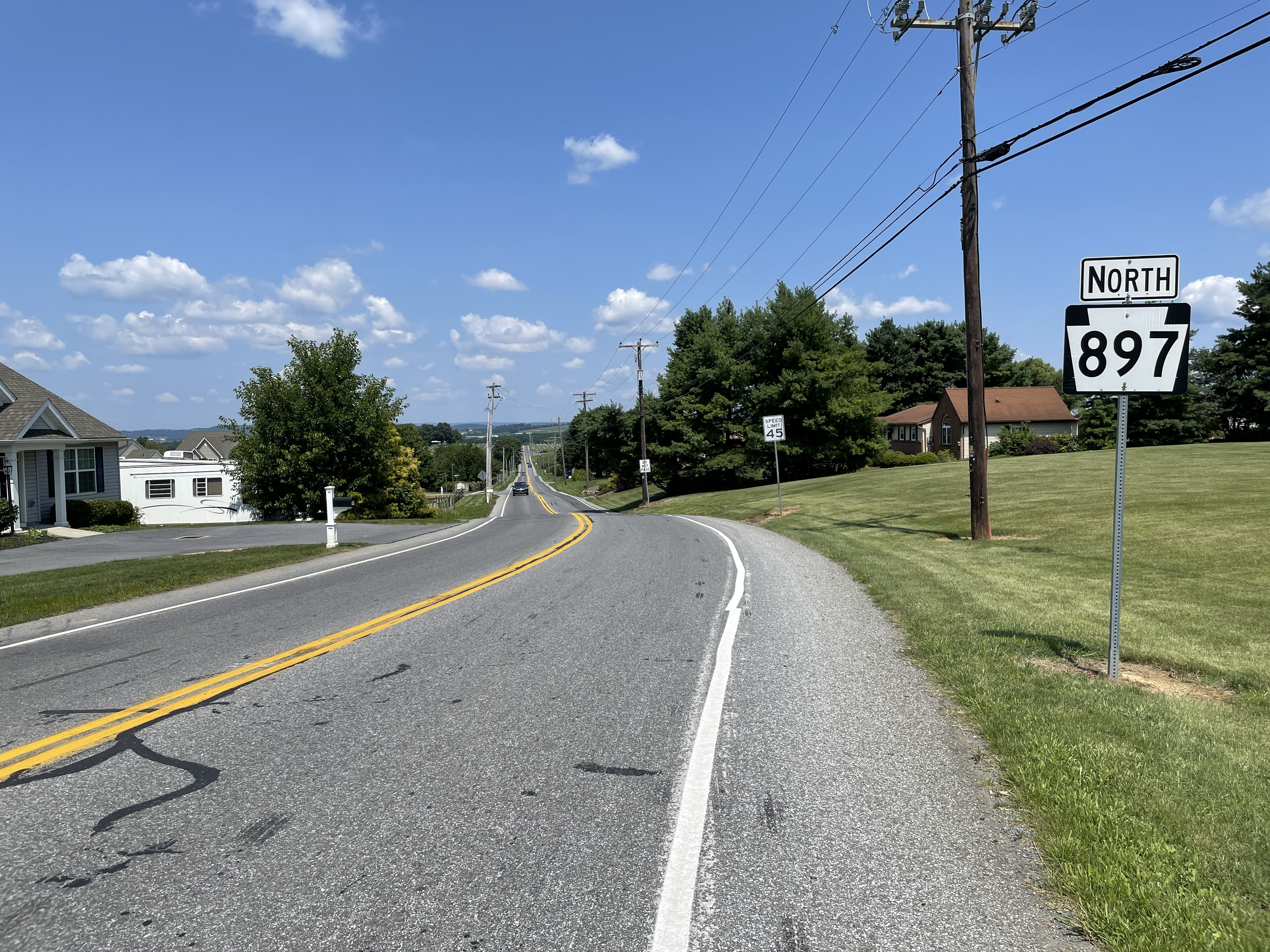
PA 897 northbound past PA 23 in East Earl Township

When Pennsylvania first legislated routes in 1911, present-day PA 897 between Gap and White Horse was designated as part of Legislative Route 142, which continued west from White Horse to Lancaster. By 1926, the road between Gap and White Horse was paved. PA 897 was designated in 1928 to run from Reinholds west to Kleinfeltersville along an unpaved road. Also, the road between Gap and White Horse was designated as the easternmost portion of PA 340. At this, the road between Kleinfeltersville and Lebanon was an unnumbered paved road while the rest of the present alignment was an unnumbered unpaved road. By 1930, the road between Blue Ball and Terre Hill was paved. In the 1930s, PA 897 was extended to its current length between US 30 and Gap and US 422 in Lebanon, replacing the portion of PA 340 between Gap and White Horse that was rerouted to head east. At this time, the entire length of the route was paved. PA 897 has remained on the same alignment since. PA 419 and PA 897 previously ran concurrent with PA 501 in Schaefferstown between Stiegel Pike and Carpenter Street. In 2013, PA 501 was shifted to bypass Schaefferstown to the west along a new alignment, eliminating the concurrency with PA 419 and PA 897.

== Major intersections ==
County	Location	mi	km	Destinations	Notes
Lancaster	Salisbury Township	0.000	0.000	US 30 (Lincoln Highway)	Southern terminus
Lancaster	Salisbury Township	3.967	6.384	PA 340 east (Old Philadelphia Pike)	South end of PA 340 overlap
Lancaster	Salisbury Township	4.492	7.229	PA 340 west (Old Philadelphia Pike)	North end of PA 340 overlap
Lancaster	East Earl Township	10.545	16.971	US 322 east – Honey Brook	South end of US 322 overlap
Lancaster	East Earl Township	10.621	17.093	US 322 west – Blue Ball, Ephrata	North end of US 322 overlap
Lancaster	East Earl Township	11.224	18.063	PA 23 east (Main Street) – Morgantown	South end of PA 23 overlap
Lancaster	East Earl Township	11.746	18.903	PA 23 west (Main Street) – Blue Ball, Lancaster	North end of PA 23 overlap
Lancaster	East Cocalico Township	20.920	33.667	PA 272 (North Reading Road) – Reamstown, Adamstown	
Lebanon	Heidelberg Township	34.711	55.862	PA 419 north (North Market Street) – Newmanstown	South end of PA 419 overlap
Lebanon	Heidelberg Township	35.327	56.853	PA 501 (Stiegel Pike) – Brickerville, Myerstown	
Lebanon	Heidelberg Township	35.488	57.112	PA 419 south (Schaeffer Road) – Cornwall	North end of PA 419 overlap
Lebanon	Lebanon–South Lebanon Township line	41.488	66.768	US 422 east (East Walnut Street)	
Lebanon	Lebanon–South Lebanon Township line	41.678	67.074	US 422 west (East Cumberland Street)	Northern terminus
1.000 mi = 1.609 km; 1.000 km = 0.621 mi: Concurrency terminus
