= White Horse, Lancaster County, Pennsylvania =

Unincorporated community in Pennsylvania, US

White Horse, Pennsylvania
- Unincorporated community
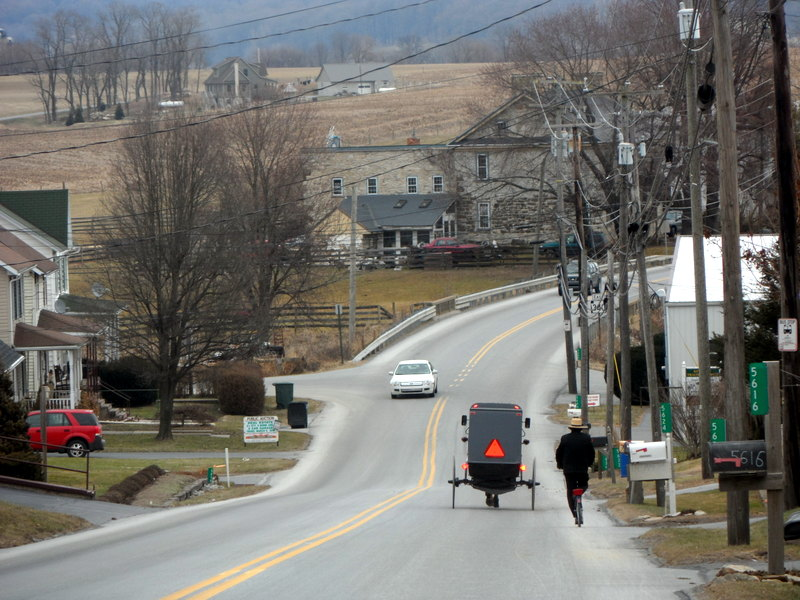
- Route 340 in 2014

- Location within the state of Pennsylvania White Horse (the United States)
- Coordinates: 40°2′5″N 76°0′6″W
- Country: United States
- State: Pennsylvania
- County: Lancaster
- Township: Salisbury
- Time zone: UTC-5 (Eastern (EST))
  - Summer (DST): UTC-4 (EDT)
- ZIP code: 17527
- Area code: 717

White Horse is an unincorporated community located within Salisbury Township in Lancaster County, Pennsylvania, United States.

White Horse sits at the junction of the Old Philadelphia Pike (Pennsylvania Route 340) and Pennsylvania Route 897, east of the village of Intercourse.
