= Spring Garden, Lancaster County, Pennsylvania =

Unincorporated community in Pennsylvania, US

Spring Garden, Pennsylvania
- Unincorporated community
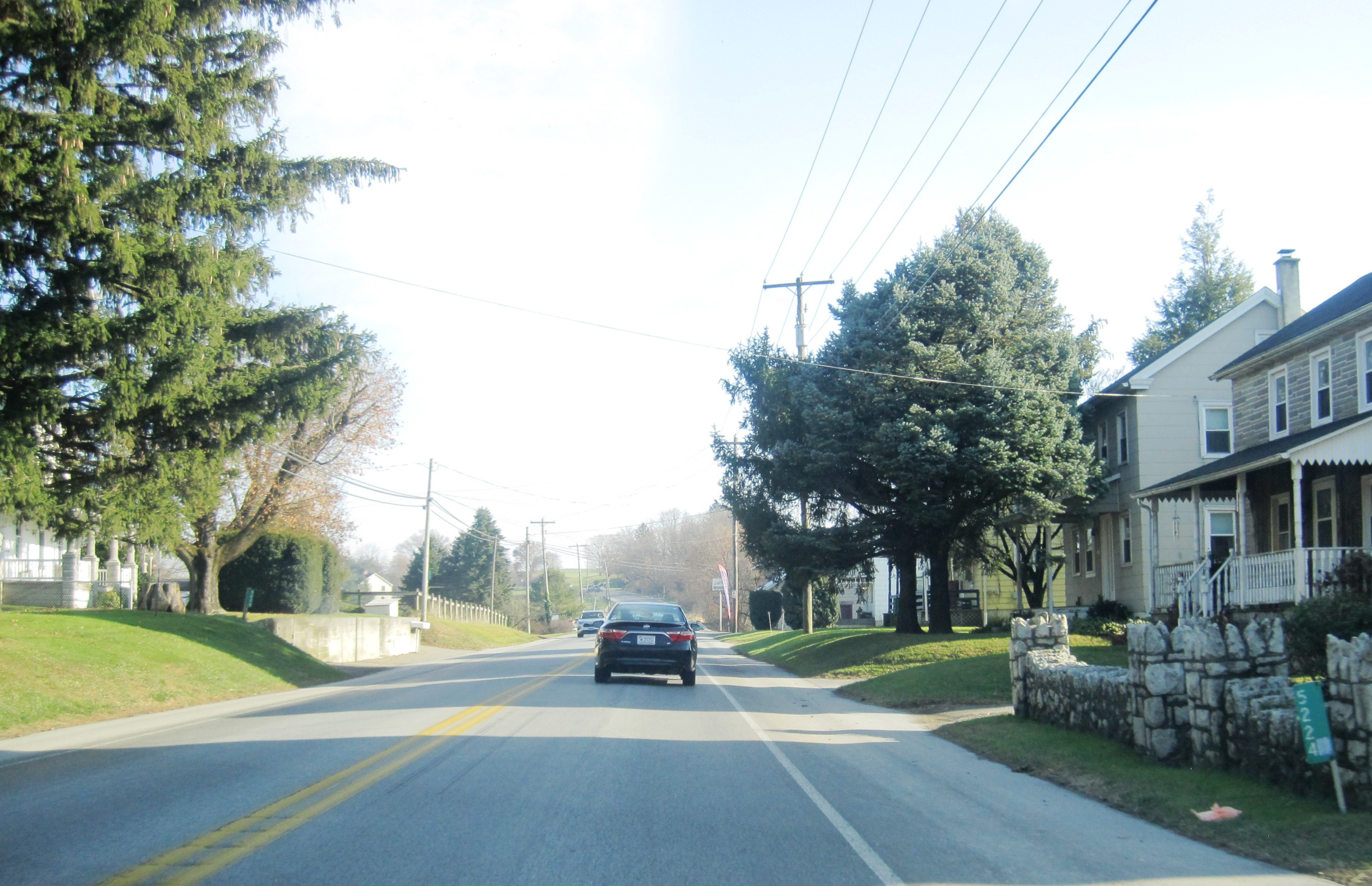
- Eastbound PA 340 through Spring Garden

- Location within Pennsylvania Location within the United States
- Coordinates: 40°2′17″N 76°1′59″W
- Country: United States
- State: Pennsylvania
- County: Lancaster
- Township: Salisbury
- Elevation: 443 ft (135 m)
- Time zone: UTC-5 (Eastern (EST))
  - Summer (DST): UTC-4 (EDT)
- Area code: 717
- GNIS feature ID: 1188226

Spring Garden is an unincorporated community in Salisbury Township in Lancaster County, Pennsylvania, United States. It is located at the intersection of Pennsylvania Route 340 and Snake Lane/Spring Garden Road.
