= Compass, Pennsylvania =

Unincorporated community in Pennsylvania, US

- Unincorporated community
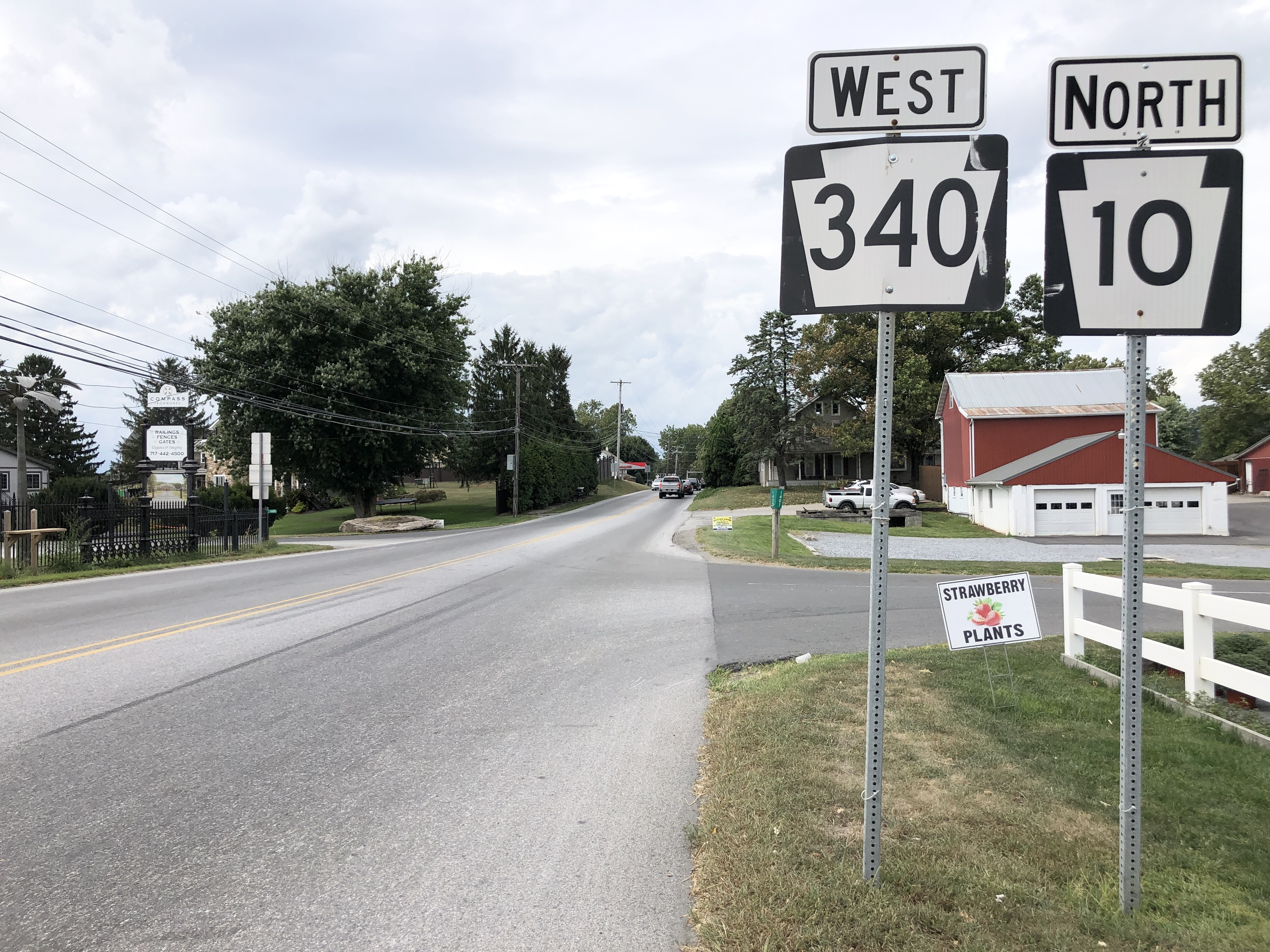
- PA 10 and PA 340 through Compass

- Location within Pennsylvania Location within the United States
- Coordinates: 40°1′21″N 75°56′33″W
- Country: United States
- State: Pennsylvania
- County: Chester
- Township: West Caln
- Elevation: 518 ft (158 m)
- Time zone: UTC-5 (Eastern (EST))
  - Summer (DST): UTC-4 (EDT)
- Area codes: 484, 610, 717
- GNIS feature ID: 1172273

Compass is an unincorporated community in West Caln Township in Chester County, Pennsylvania, United States. Compass is located at the intersection of state routes 10 and 340.

The community was named after the image of a compass on the sign of a tavern.
