= White Chimneys =

Historic house in Pennsylvania, United States

- U.S. National Register of Historic Places
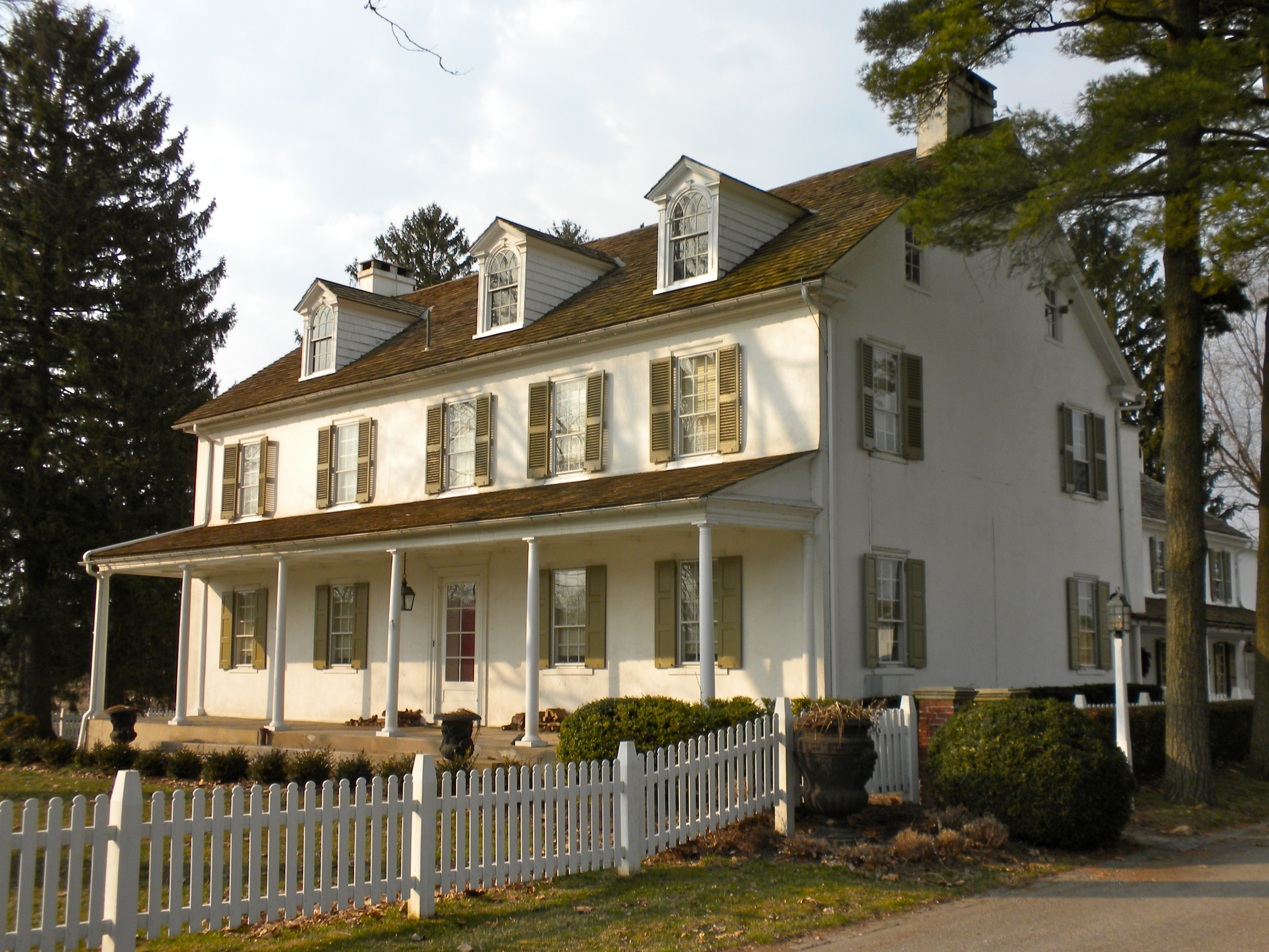
- White Chimneys, March 2010

- Location within Pennsylvania Location within the United States
- Location: 1 mile (1.6 km) northwest of Gap, Pennsylvania on U.S. Route 30, Salisbury Township, Pennsylvania
- Coordinates: 39°59′43″N 76°2′24″W
- Area: 10.3 acres (4.2 ha)
- Built: c. 1720, 1790, 1807, 1923
- Built by: Jones, Francis Slaymaker, S.R.
- Architectural style: Federal
- NRHP reference No.: 75001644
- Added to NRHP: April 1, 1975

White Chimneys is an historic home that is located in Salisbury Township, Lancaster County, Pennsylvania, United States. A large white mansion directly adjacent to U.S. Route 30, the premises were listed on The National Register of Historic Places in 1975.

== History ==
Originally built and operated between 1710 and 1720 as the Francis Jones Tavern, this historic house was the residence of the Slaymaker family between 1779 and 1999. It is a 2 1/2-story, five-bay building that was created using stuccoed limestone. It is topped by a gable roof with dormers and was built in four phases: the 1710-20 log cabin, a two-room addition in 1790, a large Federal style addition in 1807 and the west wing addition in 1923, which includes a ballroom. The mansion and grounds were considered a significant landmark by residents of the Pequea Valley during the eighteenth and nineteen centuries. The house's status as a prominent marker on the Philadelphia and Lancaster Turnpike made it suitable as a stop on the Visit of the Marquis de Lafayette to the United States in 1825.

Throughout the 1960s and 1970s, parts of the house were opened as a museum and roadside attraction. White Chimneys has a long history as the setting of ghost stories, with residents reporting unexplained smells, sounds and apparitions.

== Current use ==
The house continues to be maintained as a private residence. The grounds and formal gardens are open to the public by appointment. Most recently, the property has gained popularity as a wedding ceremony and reception venue. The bank barn and pastures are utilized for horses.
