= Smoketown Airport =

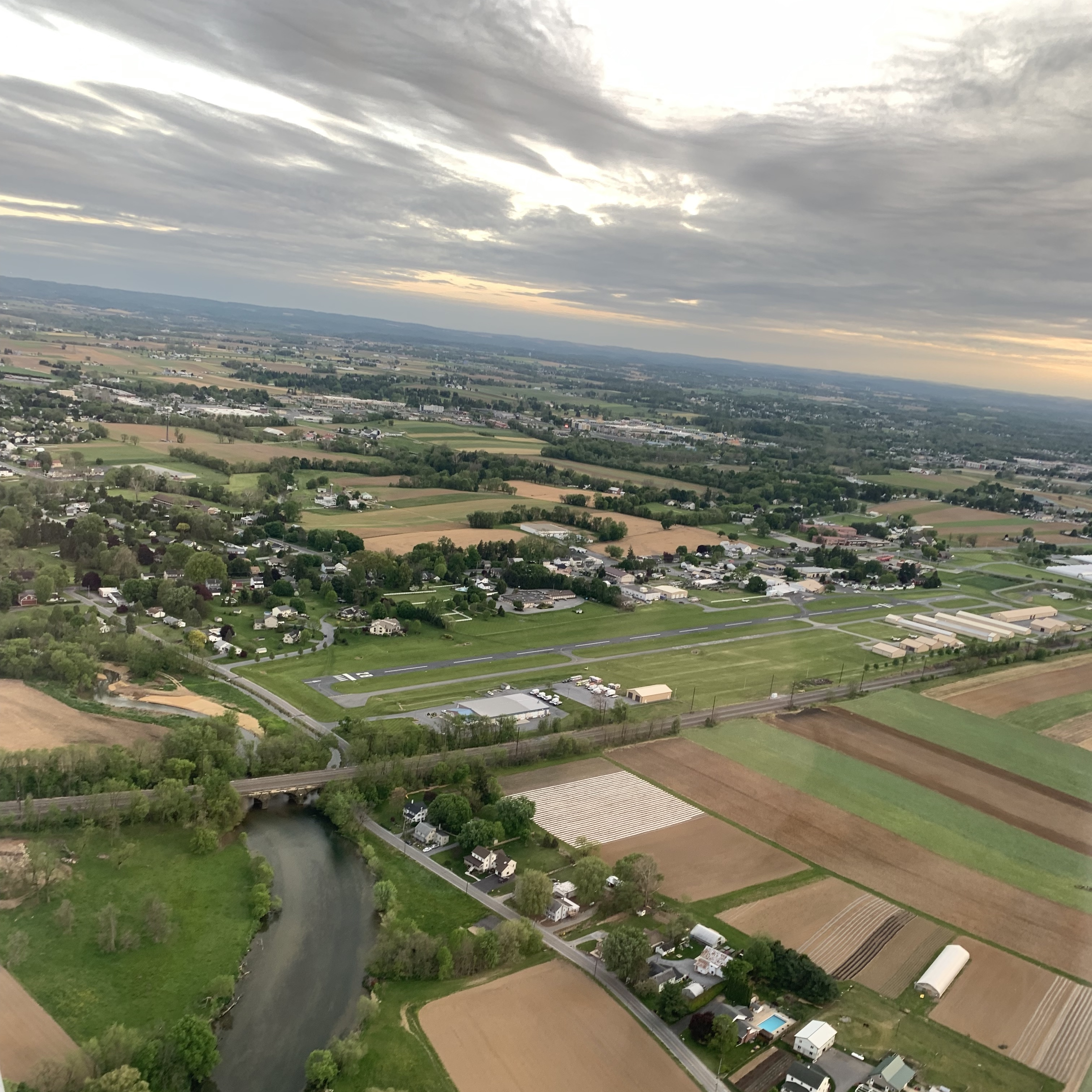
- IATA: none; ICAO: none; FAA LID: S37

Summary
- Airport type: Public
- Owner: Glick Aviation
- Location: Smoketown, Pennsylvania
- Elevation AMSL: 370 ft (110 m)
- Coordinates: 40°02′28″N 76°12′05″W

Map
- Location of airport in Pennsylvania S37 (the United States)

Runways
Direction	Length		Surface
Direction	ft	m	Surface
10/28	2,750	838.2	Asphalt

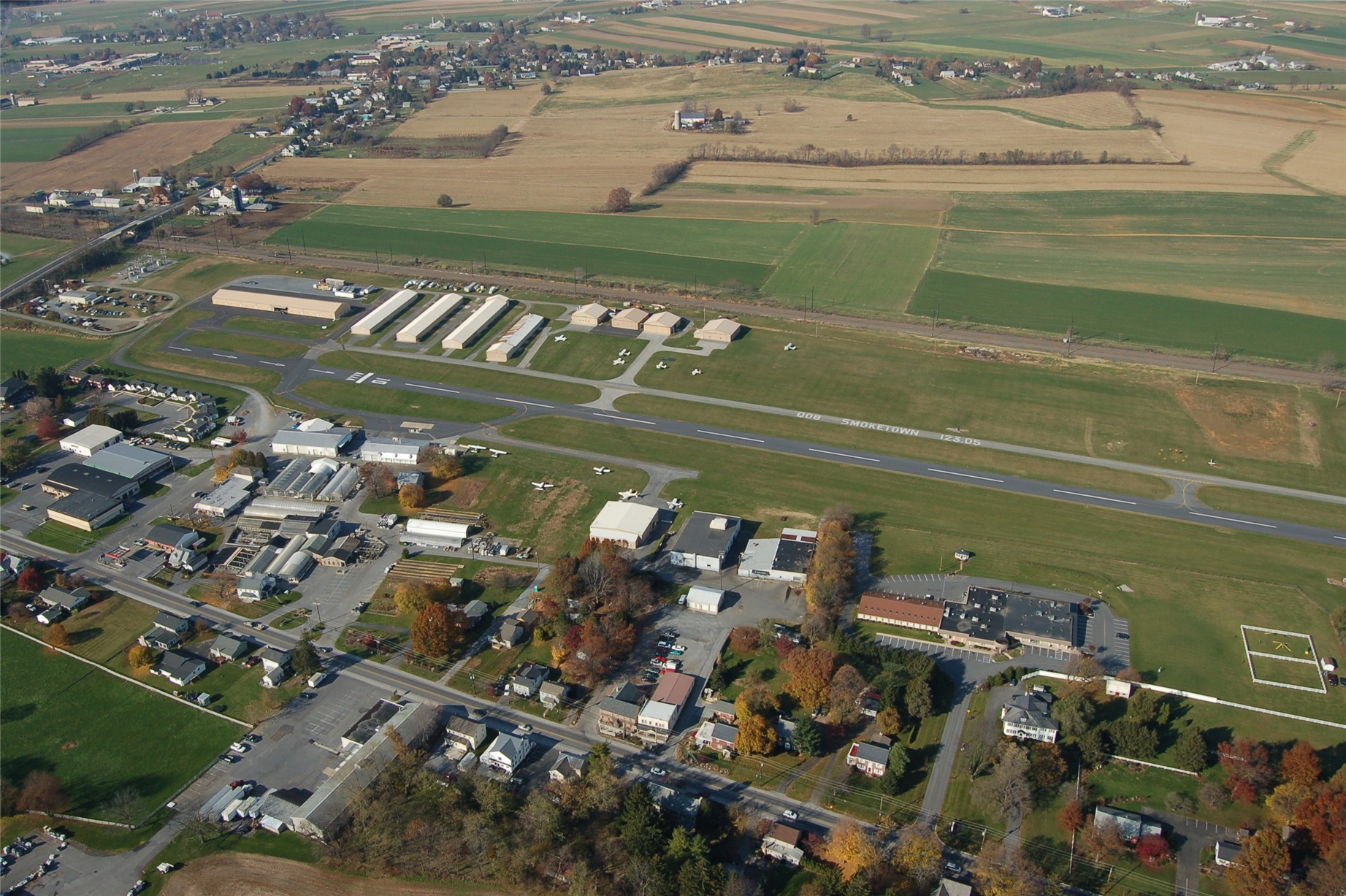
This picture is looking at the western end of the field. The T-Hangars are located on the far side of the runway and the FBO is located near the gas pumps on the near side of the runway. (The approach end of runway 28 is not visible.)

Smoketown Airport (FAA LID: S37) is an airport open to the public, located in Smoketown, 6.3 miles (10.1 km) east of Lancaster, in Lancaster County, Pennsylvania, USA. The airport is owned by Marlin Horst and managed by Mel Glick. The FAA reports an average of 74 aircraft operations per day and also reports that there are 86 aircraft based on the field. The airport also offers 100LL (100 octane low lead aircraft fuel) and 94UL is available for purchase on the field.

The identifier for Smoketown Airport used to be 37PA. FAA changed the identifier to Q08 in 2000, before changing it again in 2004 to its present identifier, S37.

== Facilities ==
Smoketown Airport covers 49 acres and has one runway:

- Runway 10/28: 2,750 x 50 ft (838.2 x 15.24 m), Surface: Asphalt

Runway 10 has a displaced threshold of 517 ft, and Runway 28 has a displaced threshold of 110 ft.

== Events ==
In the past the Smoketown Airport has hosted its local EAA chapter's fly-in however, the event moved to the nearby, larger Lancaster Airport (Pennsylvania). After this, the airport began to have its own yearly fly in called the Smoketown Airport Fly-In.

== In the news ==
On January 25, 1994, a Smoketown-based Piper piloted by Robert Faber of Lancaster, Pennsylvania, collided with trees and impacted a mountain while in cruise flight, returning from Bloomsburg Municipal Airport in Bloomsburg, Pennsylvania. The plane and occupant were not found for four days. Mechanical failure was suspected.

On May 12, 2005, Hayden Sheaffer of Lititz, Pennsylvania and Troy Martin, of Akron, Pennsylvania entered restricted air space in Washington, DC on the way to an air show in Lumberton, North Carolina. Subsequently, they were forced to land and were subject to having their misadventure broadcast internationally.

On August 25, 2009, A student pilot, flying the same aircraft that Hayden Sheafer and Troy Martin flew into DC Airspace, violated the Special Flight Rules area of the District of Columbia. The student pilot was also forced to land at Montgomery County Airpark in Gaithersburg, Maryland.

On March 30, 2013, at approximately 5:45pm EDT, a single-seat Kolb Firefly flown by Michael Blank, 30, crashed at the end of the runway shortly after takeoff. The pilot was pronounced dead at the scene.

On July 17, 2013, At approximately 1:00pm EDT, a small 2 seat Kitfox experimental aircraft lost engine power while taking off and was forced to make an emergency in a nearby cornfield. Both the pilot and his passenger were not injured.

== See also ==
- List of airports in Pennsylvania
