= WNUZ-LP =

Coordinates: 39.977°N 76.054°W

WNUZ
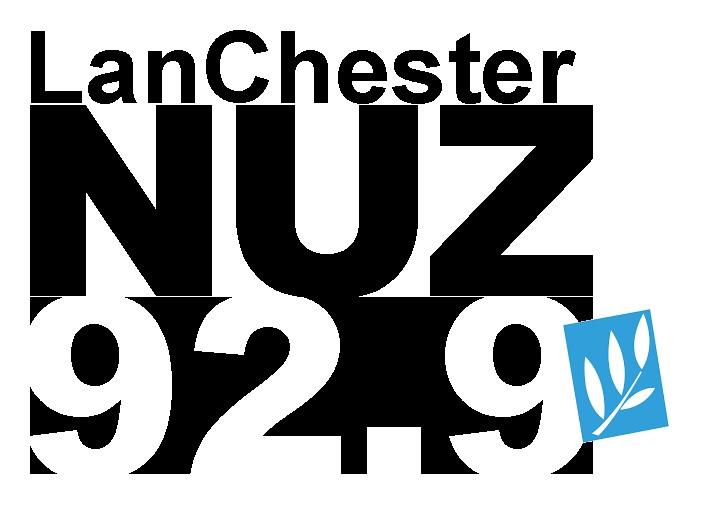
- Gap, Pennsylvania; United States
- Broadcast area: Lancaster County, Pennsylvania; Chester County, Pennsylvania
- Frequency: 92.9 MHz
- Branding: NUZ radio, LanChester NUZ 92.9, LanChester 92.9 and W-NUZ

Programming
- Format: All-news Non-Commercial Educational
- Affiliations: Pacifica Radio Network Free Speech TV Global Community Radio PRX

Ownership
- Owner: The General Public; (WLRI, Inc.)
- Sister stations: WNUZ+PLUS TV, Lancaster's Free Speech TV, LanChester NUZ Channel, Lancaster NUZ Network (online/cable)

History
- Former call signs: WOMB-LP (2003–2004); WGCP-LP (2004); WOMB-LP (2004); WLDW-LP (2004); WOBS-LP (2004–2005); WGPQ-LP (2005); WLBX-LP (2005); WOBS-LP (2005); WLRI-LP (2005–2006); WLIZ-LP (2006); WTPP-LP (2006); WOMB-LP (2006); WPAG-LP (2006–2007); WLIZ-LP (2007); WLAL-LP (2007); WLRI-LP (2007–2008); WOPR-LP (2008); WLRI-LP (2008); WRLY-LP (2008); WLRI-LP (2008–2017); WLYH-LP (2017); WLRI-LP (2017–2018); WTPA-LP (2018); WLRI-LP (2018–2020)
- Call sign meaning: World News

Technical information
- Licensing authority: FCC
- Facility ID: 135143
- Class: L1
- ERP: 250 watts
- HAAT: 15.25 meters (50.0 ft)
- Transmitter coordinates: see FCC website

Links
- Public license information: Public file; LMS
- Webcast: WUZ.org for any links to live stream(s)
- Website: www.wnuz.org

WNUZ (92.9 MHz) is a non-commercial, non-profit, educational low-power FM radio station licensed to serve Gap, Pennsylvania. The station is licensed to a non-membership, non-profit private Pennsylvania corporation. It airs an All-News radio stations and information radio format. WNUZ is affiliated with the Pacifica Radio Network. It has also featured the internationally weekday syndicated shows from Thom Hartmann, Rick Smith, Brad Friedman, Dan Delgado, Laura Flanders, Sonali Kolhatkar, Randi Rhodes, and comedian Stephanie Miller.

== Station history ==
WNUZ is a full-service community radio station licensed to serve Gap, Pennsylvania, with a reach of Lancaster, Chester, Southern Berks, and Southeastern York Counties. WNUZ broadcasts in FM stereo from transmitter facilities located in Gap, Pennsylvania.

The station's original construction permit was granted on October 16, 2003. Initial broadcast took place shortly thereafter from studios on North Christiana Avenue in Gap, Pennsylvania (Sadsbury Township).

In fall 2008, the then-WLRI-LP began reading the Intelligencer Journal and Lancaster New Era newspapers on the air, under an exclusive agreement with Lancaster Newspapers, Inc. (now known as "LNP Media Group"). In summer 2010, WLRI-LP began reading the Sunday News newspaper. All three newspapers were renamed in 2014 and now go by "LNP" and "LNP Sunday News" respectively. The service airs from 3:PM until 5:PM daily to this day.

On July 12, 2004, WLRI began airing programming from the Pacifica Radio Network and other community and non-commercial sources worldwide, along with live "in studio" news, weather, traffic and current affairs. Additional programming offerings from Pacifica Radio Network, WYD Media Management, Dan Delgado, SM Radio Productions, Mythical Intelligence, Inc., and Democracy Now! supplement daytime and some weekend on-air programming.

On March 17, 2015, WLRI filed for a new construction permit to relocate the transmitter and improve its overall service area. The application was granted by the Federal Communications Commission on March 19, 2015. On March 28, 2015, WLRI was granted permission to relocate and increase TPO to 250 watts and ERP to 100 watts. On April 20, 2015, control of WLRI was transferred to WLRI Incorporated, a non-membership, non-profit private Pennsylvania corporation following the consummation of its previous licensee. On June 15, 2015, WLRI began operating at full power and applied for license to cover, subsequently granted.

On May 6, 2016, WLRI announced that it began establishing an online public file and virtual front desk in compliance to Federal Communications Commission rule-makings passed in early 2016.

The call sign "WNUZ" was acquired as a direct result of the COVID-19 pandemic to clearly identify the station and its programming format. On June 1, 2020, WLRI changed its call sign to WNUZ and began airing an "all news" programming service. At the time, programming included local, state, and federal COVID-19 information and resources. WNUZ remained in operation through declared emergency periods of COVID-19 without any federal, state, or local financial assistance.

WNUZ does not authorize use of its call sign to any other station in the United States and is the sole holder of WNUZ, and therefore does not use the LP suffix except on the air when legally required for on-air identification. The station branding of LanChester NUZ 92.9 and WNUZ began with the selection of the call sign in June 2020.

On September 29, 2025, at 09:29 A.M. (EDT) WNUZ began its twenty-fourth year by transitioning from calling itself "LanChester NUZ 92.9" to "Lancaster NUZ 92.9" following the successful relocation of facilities which are in the clear line of sight of the city of Lancaster, Pennsylvania.

== Network affiliations ==
On November 1, 2003, WNUZ officially became the first Pacifica Radio Network station in Southeastern Pennsylvania. It also airs the Thom Hartmann Show and the Stephanie Miller Show, Free Speech TV, Global Community Radio, On The Farm Radio and Keystone State News Connection reports.
