= Gap, Pennsylvania =

Unincorporated community in Pennsylvania, US

- Census-designated place
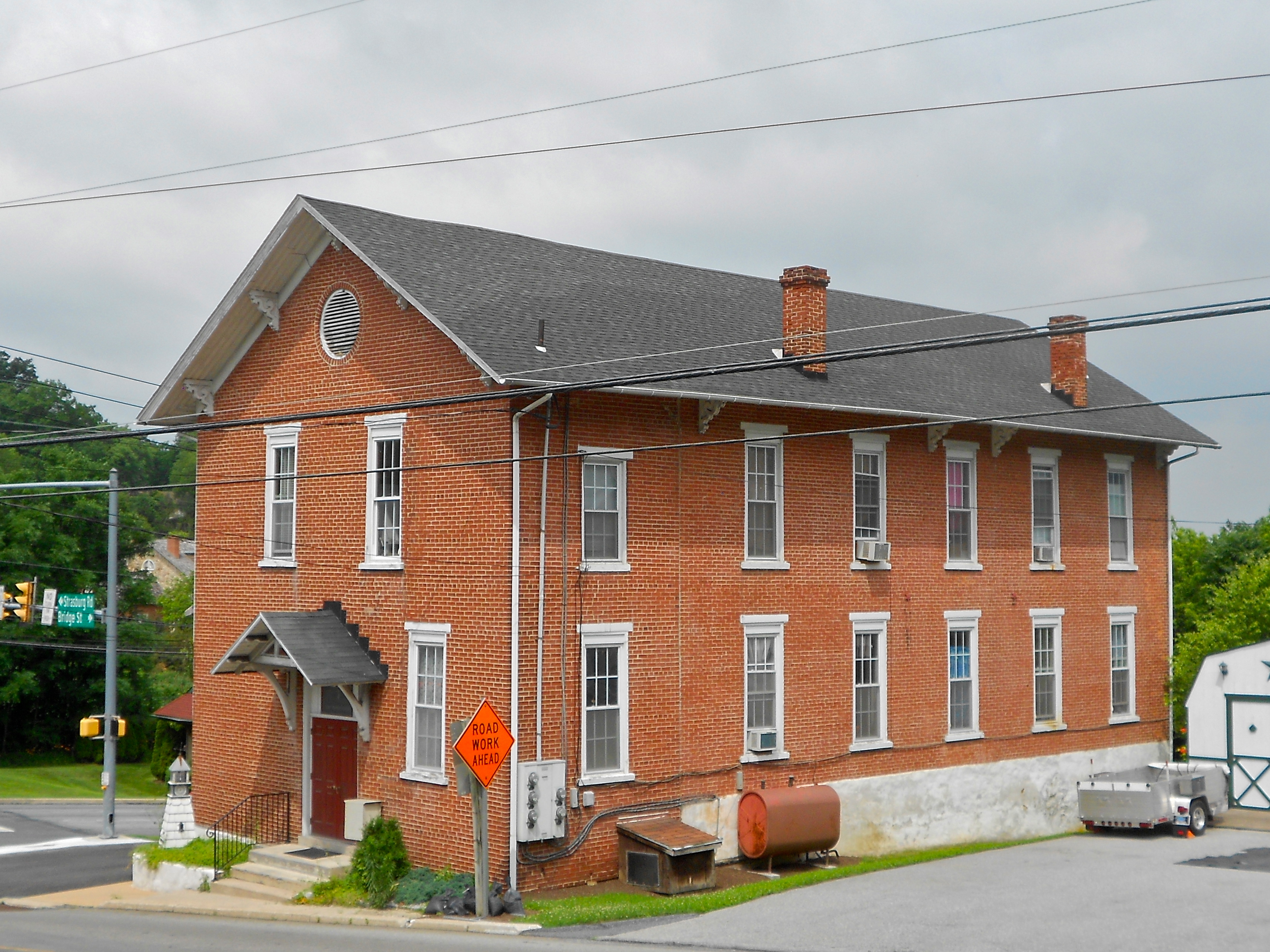
- Store in Gap

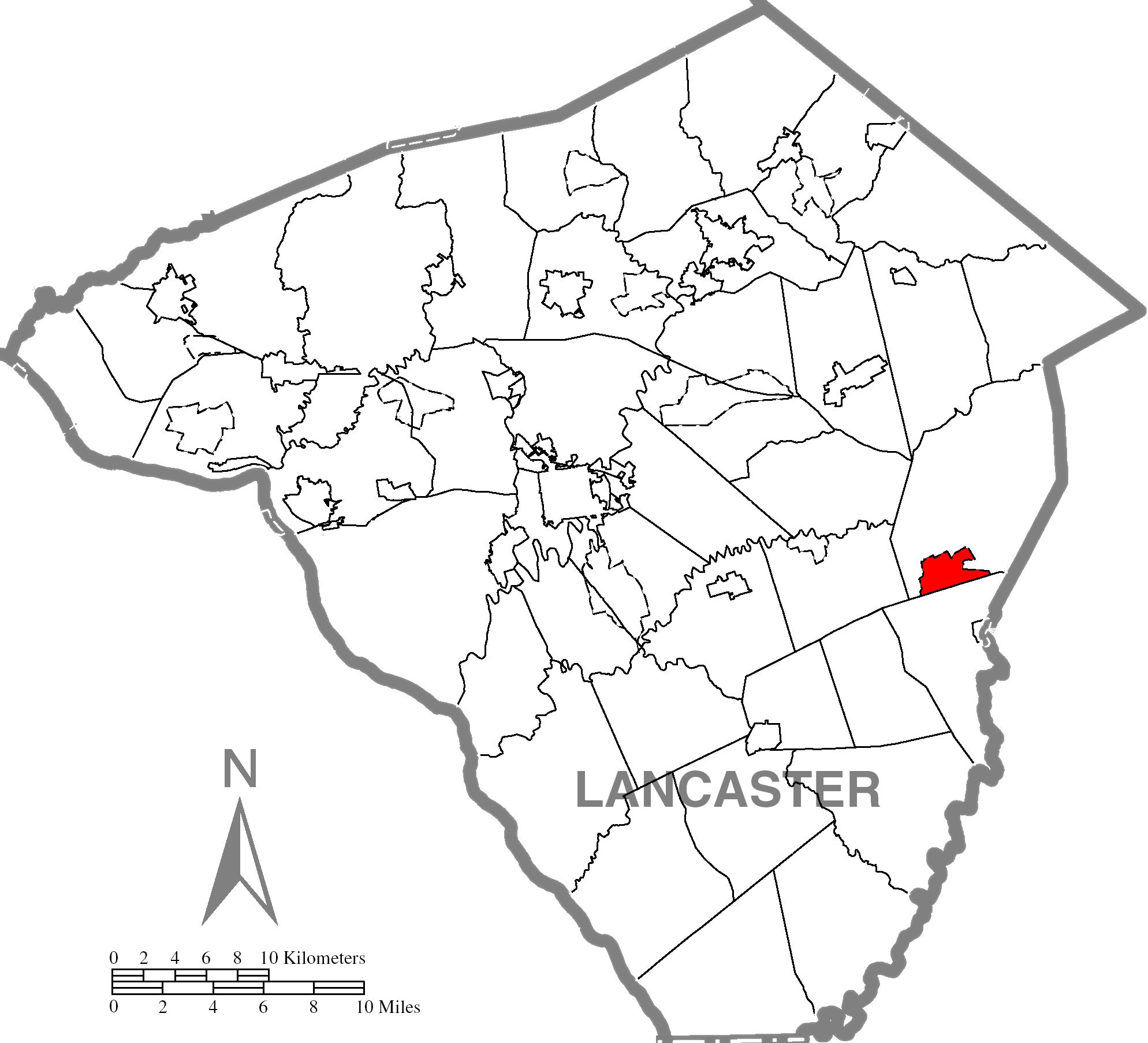
- Location in Lancaster County

- Location in Pennsylvania Location in the United States
- Coordinates: 39°59′14″N 76°01′14″W
- Country: United States
- State: Pennsylvania
- County: Lancaster
- Townships: Salisbury, Sadsbury

Area
  - Total: 2.90 sq mi (7.52 km^{2})
  - Land: 2.90 sq mi (7.52 km^{2})
  - Water: 0.0039 sq mi (0.01 km^{2})
- Elevation: 545 ft (166 m)

Population (2020)
  - Total: 2,186
  - Density: 753.4/sq mi (290.88/km^{2})
- Time zone: UTC-5 (Eastern (EST))
  - Summer (DST): UTC-4 (EDT)
- ZIP code: 17527
- Area code: 717
- GNIS feature ID: 1175420
- FIPS code: 42-28376

Gap is a census-designated place (CDP) and unincorporated community in Salisbury Township, Lancaster County, Pennsylvania, United States, with a ZIP code of 17527. The population was 1,931 at the 2010 census. U.S. Route 30 passes through the town, which is also the terminus for four Pennsylvania highways: 772, 741, 897, and the heavily used 41, which leads toward Wilmington, Delaware.

Gap lies approximately 16 miles (26 km) east of Lancaster and 49 miles (79 km) west of Philadelphia.

== History ==
Gap was named for its location at a low pass through Mine Ridge. Gap has a history which can be dated as far back as William Penn's first visits to the area. Isaac Taylor erected the first house in what would become Gap in 1747. The area around Gap had a copper mine and what at the time were the only nickel mines in the United States.

From 1792, the Rising Sun Tavern stood on the Philadelphia–Lancaster Pike (which is now U.S. Route 30) and had a small village with blacksmith shop. Most of the buildings stood until circa 2020–2021, when they were removed for redevelopment; the site now contains a large convenience store and gas station. Although there was interest among locals to preserve the buildings, the real estate was valuable commercial frontage and funding for preservation was not available.

A stretch of railroad line was laid through the pass in the 19th century. Today the same railroad right-of-way carries Amtrak trains on the Keystone service.

In the mid-19th century there was a group of men known as "The Gap Gang". They would engage in raids and robberies of citizens traveling the Lancaster Philadelphia Turnpike. They were notorious for kidnapping free blacks and escaped slaves and selling them to slave traders in Maryland, Delaware, and Virginia. The Gap Gang were most noted for their involvement in the Christiana Riot.

Nearby to the west, and traditionally closely associated with Gap, is White Chimneys, a country estate that began as a Church Dutch family farm much like any other in the area but eventually became known for wealth because it was the home of the Slaymaker family, who owned the Slaymaker Lock Company of Lancaster City.

== Geography ==
Gap is in eastern Lancaster County, in the southern part of Salisbury Township. A small portion of the community extends south into Sadsbury Township. The gap for which the community is named is at an elevation of 580 feet (180 m) above sea level, between Mine Ridge to the west and Gap Hill to the east, both ridges rising to about 750 feet (230 m) above sea level. The community occupies the center of the gap and extends northward downslope into Salisbury Township.

According to the United States Census Bureau, the CDP has a total area of 2.8 square miles (7.3 km^{2}), of which 2.0 acres (7,943 m^{2}), or 0.11%, are water. The gap separates the watersheds of two tributaries of the Susquehanna River. To the north, streams flow to Pequea Creek, which flows west to the Susquehanna at Pequea. To the south, water flows to the East Branch of Octoraro Creek, reaching the Susquehanna just south of Conowingo Dam in Maryland.

== Roads ==
U.S. Route 30 (the Lincoln Highway) passes through Gap, leading west 16 miles (26 km) to Lancaster and east 10 miles (16 km) to Coatesville and eventually Philadelphia.

Pennsylvania Route 41 begins in Gap at US 30 and leads southeast 30 miles (48 km) to the Wilmington, Delaware, area. It is a major route for commercial trucks.

Pennsylvania Route 772 starts four blocks west of the intersection of PA 41 and US 30. It leads northwest 21 miles (34 km) to Lititz, passing through Intercourse, Leola, Brownstown, and Rothsville along the way.

In August 2016, a $10,000,000 realignment project was completed, separating eastbound and westbound traffic on US Route 30 between PA Route 41 and just west of PA Route 772. This has not eliminated the previous congestion problems that often plagued that area, only complicating travel and adding to congestion and even more serious accidents. This is why PennDOT is reviewing and implementing additional projects to improve congestion both east and west of the Gap Bypass on or before the year 2045.

Pennsylvania Route 897 starts in Gap one block east of Route 41 at US 30. It leads north 11 miles (18 km) to Blue Ball, passing over Welsh Mountain along the way.

Pennsylvania Route 741 starts at the intersection of PA 41 and Bridge Street. The route leads west 19 miles (31 km) to Millersville.

The Gap Fire Co. is located along Pequea Avenue, one block west of PA 41. The fire company was originally located atop Pequea Avenue by their water refilling area. The original fire house was renovated into a home that is leased out. A new facility was built to house all of the rescue trucks.

== Demographics ==
Historical population
Census	Pop.	Note	%±
2020	2,186		—
U.S. Decennial Census

The Gap Town Clock

As of the census of 2000, there were 3,320 people, 1,505 households, and 714 families residing in the CDP. The racial makeup of the CDP was 95% White, 3% Black or African American, 0.06% Native American, 1.06% Asian, 0.12% Pacific Islander, 0.12% from other races, and 0.31% from two or more races. 1% of the population were Hispanic or Latino of any race.

There were 714 households, out of which 38.8% had children under the age of 18 living with them, 68.7% were married couples living together, 7.2% had a female householder with no husband present, and 19.6% were non-families. 16.4% of all households were made up of individuals, and 5.8% had someone living alone who was 65 years of age or older. The average household size was 2.82 and the average family size was 3.14.

In the CDP, the population was spread out, with 29.4% under the age of 18, 7.1% from 18 to 24, 29.7% from 25 to 44, 23.7% from 45 to 64, and 10.1% who were 65 years of age or older. The median age was 36 years.

The median income for a household in the CDP was $100,313, and the median income for a family was $51,181. Males had a median income of $38,958 versus $24,803 for females. The per capita income for the CDP was $18,052. About 4.4% of families and 14.109% of the population were below the poverty line, including those under age 18 and 24.055% of those age 65 or over.

== Attractions ==
The Gap Town Clock, built in 1892, is a Lancaster County Historic Preservation Trust Site. According to the Gap Clock Tower Association, "The clock's face, long telling the time to passing multitudes, overlooks, at the gap, William Penns' entrance into Conestoga, now Lancaster County, in 1701."

== Media ==
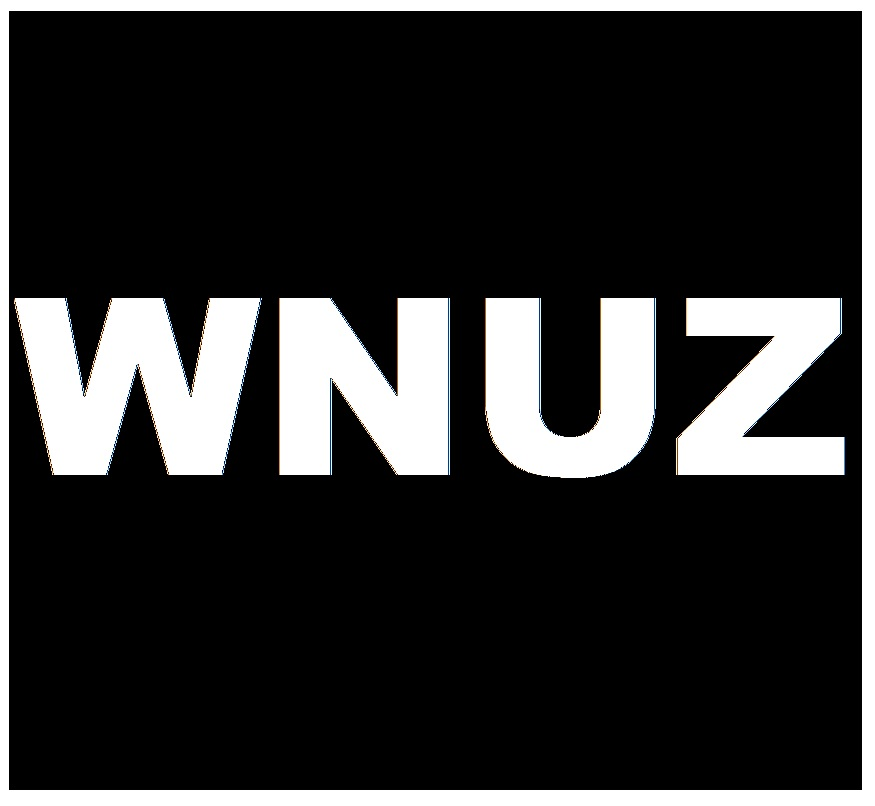
WNUZ

On April 20, 2001, Gap became home to first generation Low Power FM broadcast station WNUZ-LP, which has had many studio locations in Gap. WNUZ is a volunteer, all news community radio station. In 2018, WNUZ began streamlining many of its public services to its website WNUZ.org (then WLRI).

== Notable people ==
- Anne F. Beiler, founder of Auntie Anne's
- William Chester Ruth (1882–1971), African American inventor and machinist
- Charles Coates Walker (1920–2004), Quaker activist
