= Salisbury Township, Lancaster County, Pennsylvania =

Township in Pennsylvania, US

Coordinates: 39°59′00″N 76°01′59″W

- Township
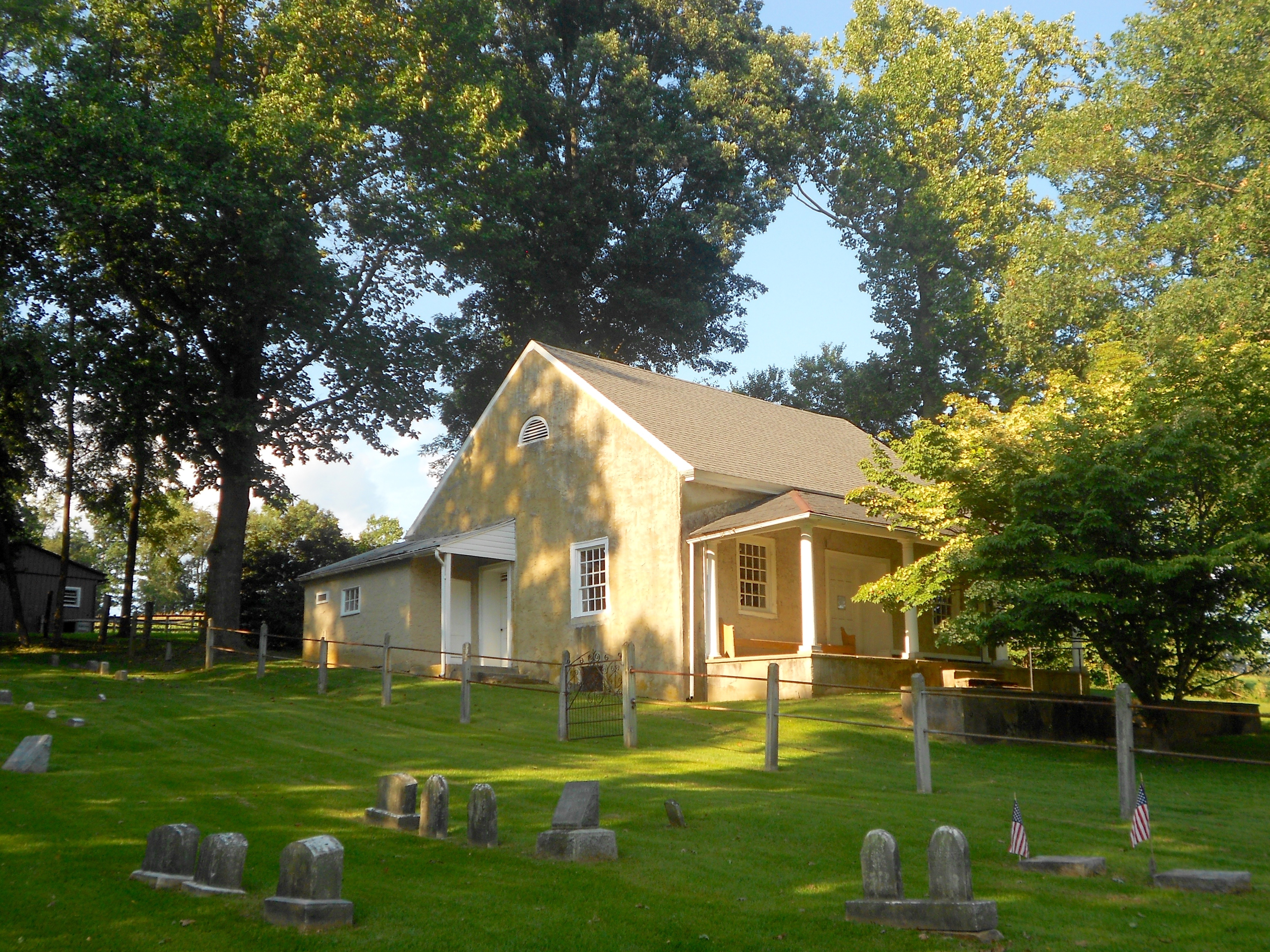
- Bart Friends Meeting House in Salisbury Township

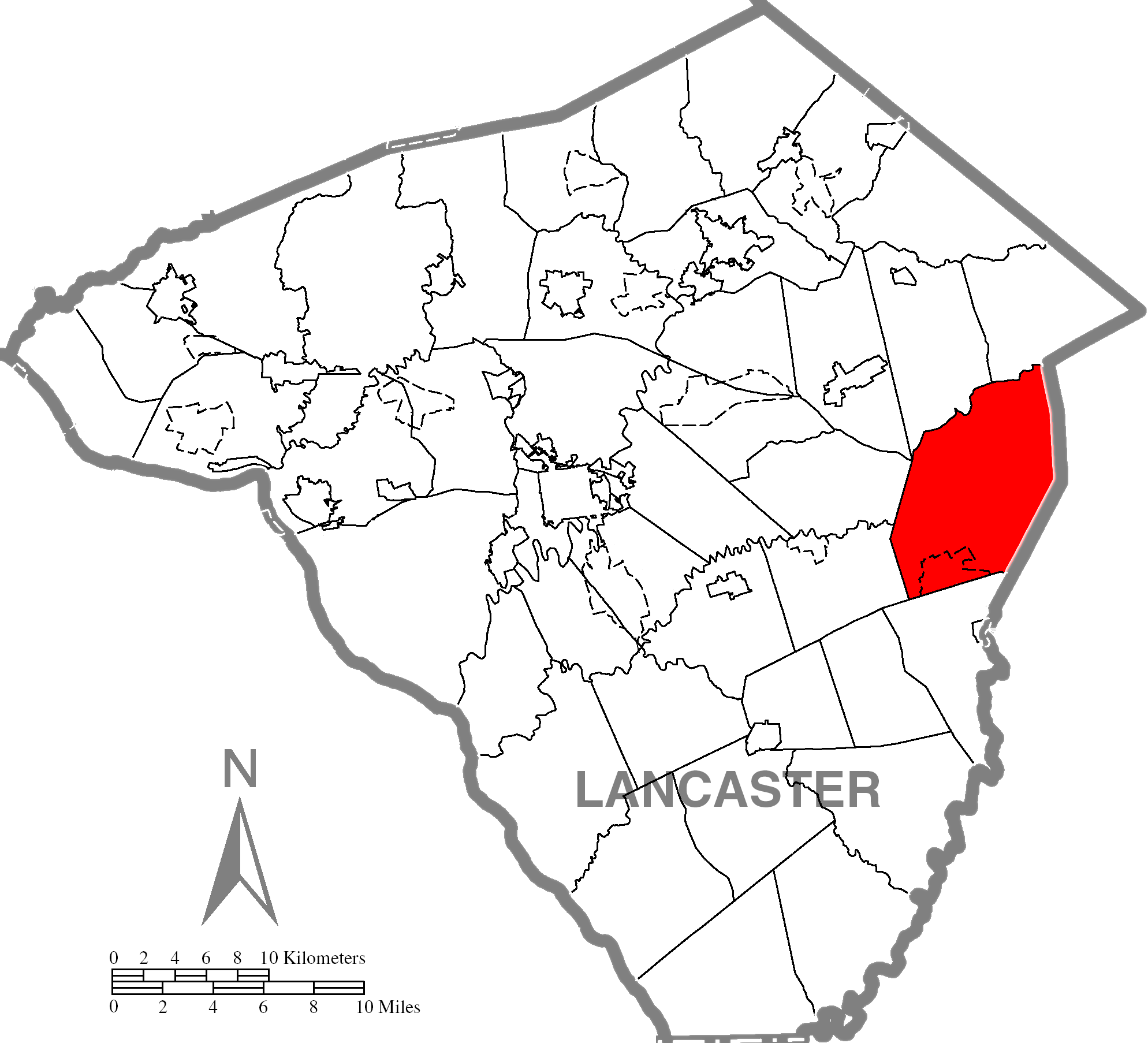
- Location of Salisbury Township in Lancaster County, Pennsylvania
- Country: United States
- State: Pennsylvania
- County: Lancaster
- Settled: 1712
- Incorporated: 1729

Government
  - Type: Board of Supervisors

Area
  - Total: 41.95 sq mi (108.64 km^{2})
  - Land: 41.76 sq mi (108.16 km^{2})
  - Water: 0.19 sq mi (0.49 km^{2})

Population (2020)
  - Total: 11,531 ▲
  - Estimate (2021): 11,483
  - Density: 273.2/sq mi (105.48/km^{2})
- Time zone: UTC-5 (Eastern (EST))
  - Summer (DST): UTC-4 (EDT)
- Area code: 717
- FIPS code: 42-071-67568
- Website: www.salisburytownship.org

Salisbury Township is a township in east central Lancaster County, Pennsylvania, United States. The population was 11,531 at the 2020 census.

== History ==
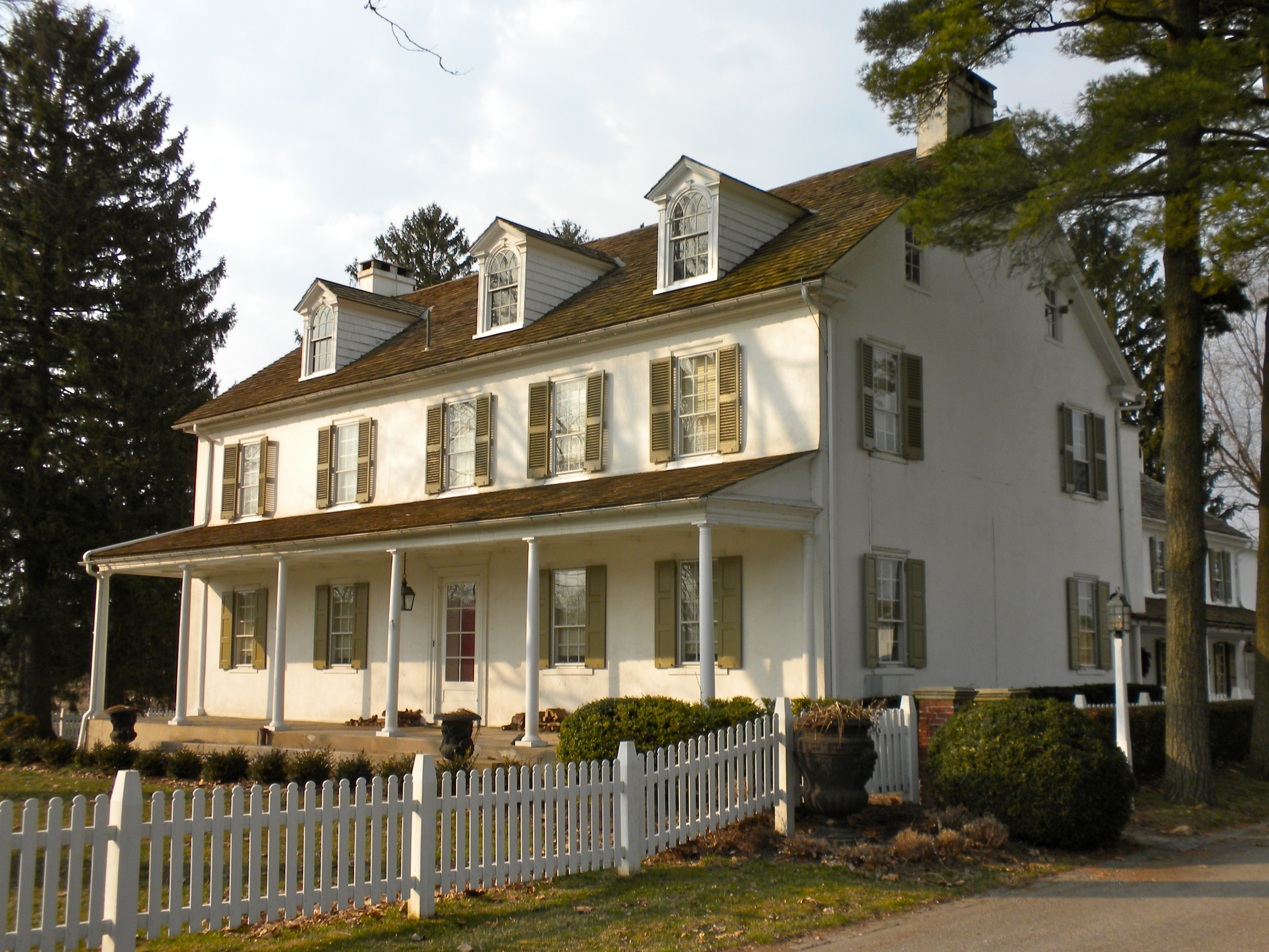
White Chimneys in Salisbury Township

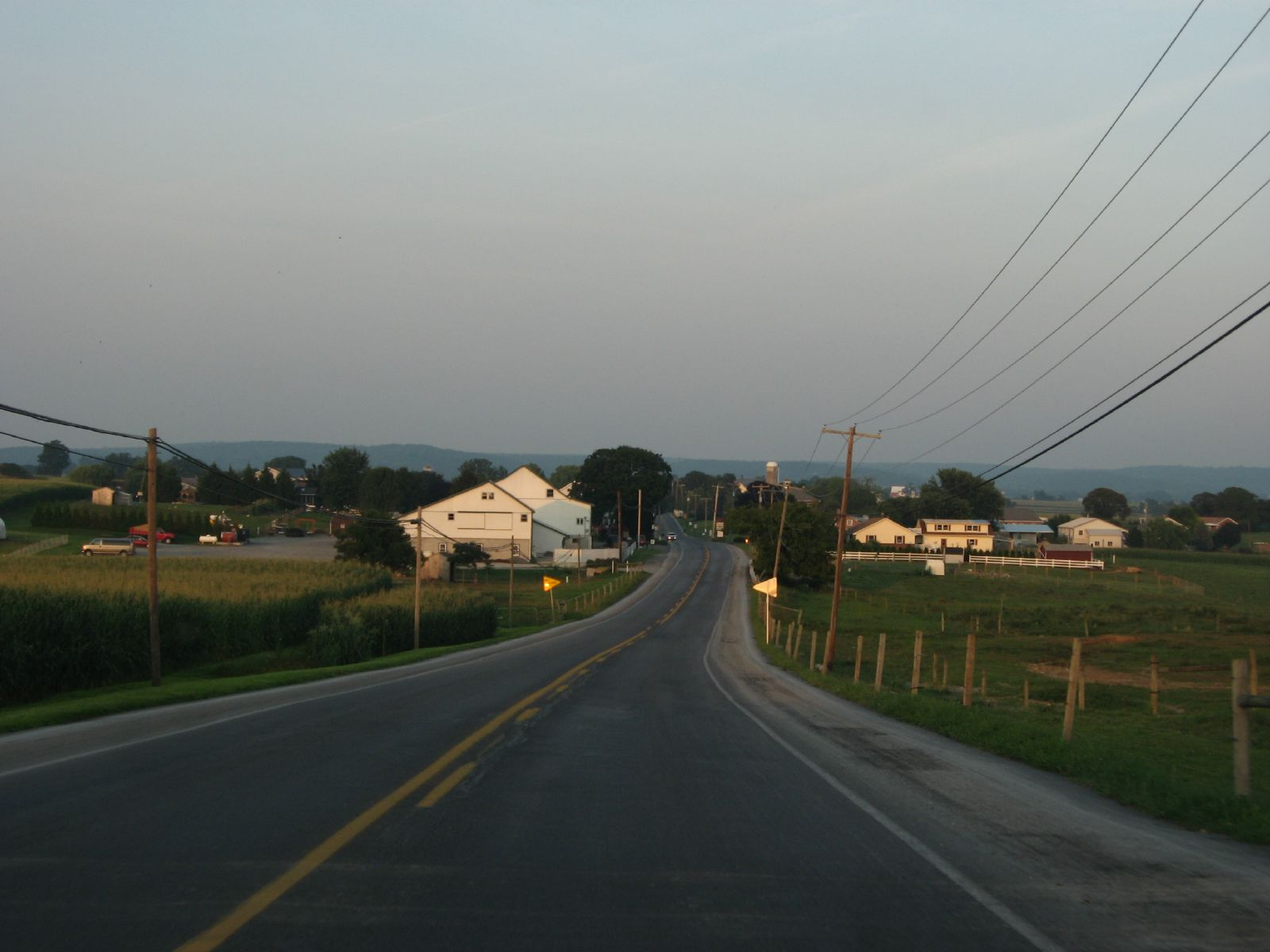
Near White Horse in the township

Salisbury Township was carved out of Pequea Township in 1729 and named for Salisbury, England. Though still mostly agricultural, it has been a center of commerce and industry of Lancaster County, with nickel mining beginning in 1718 and a more profitable limestone mining beginning soon after.

White Chimneys was listed on the National Register of Historic Places in 1975.

== Geography ==
According to the U.S. Census Bureau, the township has a total area of 41.9 square miles (108.4 km^{2}), all of which is land. Unincorporated communities in the township include Mountain Top, South Hermitage, Mount Airy, Springville, Spring Garden, Salisbury Heights, White Horse, Cains, Buena Vista, Buyerstown, Jacksonville, Gap, Limeville, and parts of Cambridge and New Milltown.

== Demographics ==
Historical population
Census	Pop.	Note	%±
2000	10,012		—
2010	11,062		10.5%
2020	11,531		4.2%
2021 (est.)	11,483		−0.4%
U.S. Decennial Census

At the 2000 census there were 10,012 people, 3,027 households, and 2,530 families living in the township. The population density was 239.2 inhabitants per square mile (92.4/km^{2}). There were 3,112 housing units at an average density of 74.4 per square mile (28.7/km^{2}). The racial makeup of the township was 97.47% White, 0.76% African American, 0.12% Native American, 0.49% Asian, 0.04% Pacific Islander, 0.34% from other races, and 0.78% from two or more races. Hispanic or Latino of any race were 1.08%.

There were 3,027 households, 44.5% had children under the age of 18 living with them, 74.2% were married couples living together, 5.7% had a female householder with no husband present, and 16.4% were non-families. 13.7% of households were made up of individuals, and 5.5% were one person aged 65 or older. The average household size was 3.29 and the average family size was 3.64.

The age distribution was 34.8% under the age of 18, 8.6% from 18 to 24, 27.8% from 25 to 44, 20.2% from 45 to 64, and 8.5% 65 or older. The median age was 30 years. For every 100 females, there were 102.5 males. For every 100 females age 18 and over, there were 99.4 males.

The median household income was $45,795 and the median family income was $49,623. Males had a median income of $36,644 versus $22,153 for females. The per capita income for the township was $16,268. About 7.1% of families and 9.3% of the population were below the poverty line, including 11.6% of those under age 18 and 15.2% of those age 65 or over.
