= Mill Creek (Conestoga River tributary) =

River in Lancaster County, Pennsylvania, US

Coordinates: 40°00′05″N 76°18′16″W

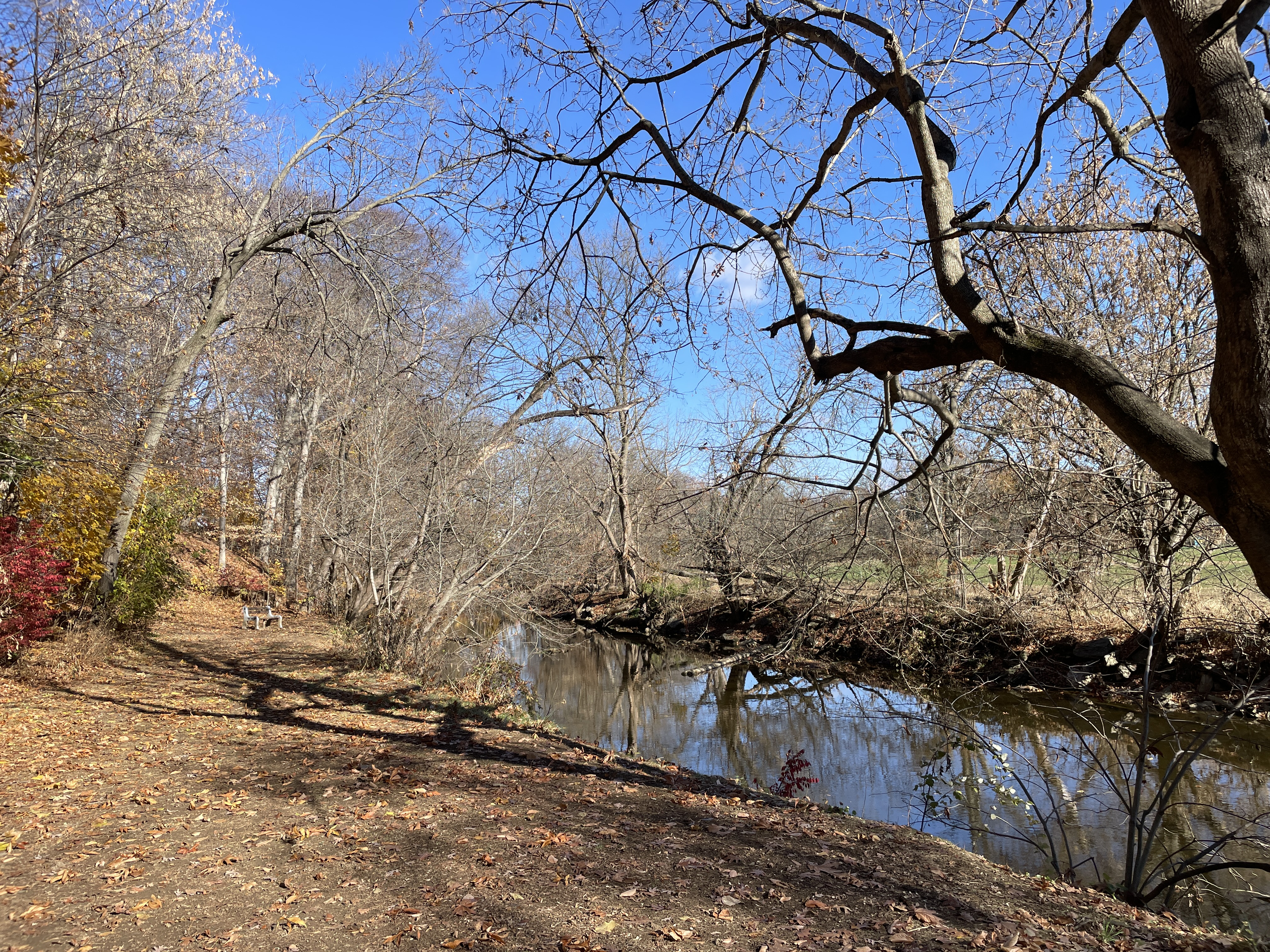
Mill Creek in East Lampeter Township

Mill Creek is a 26.7-mile-long (43.0 km) tributary of the Conestoga River in Lancaster County, Pennsylvania, in the United States.

Mill Creek joins the Conestoga River near the community of Lyndon.

== See also ==
- List of rivers of Pennsylvania
