= Joanna, Pennsylvania =

Unincorporated community in the U.S. state of Pennsylvania

Coordinates: 40°10′25″N 75°51′43″W

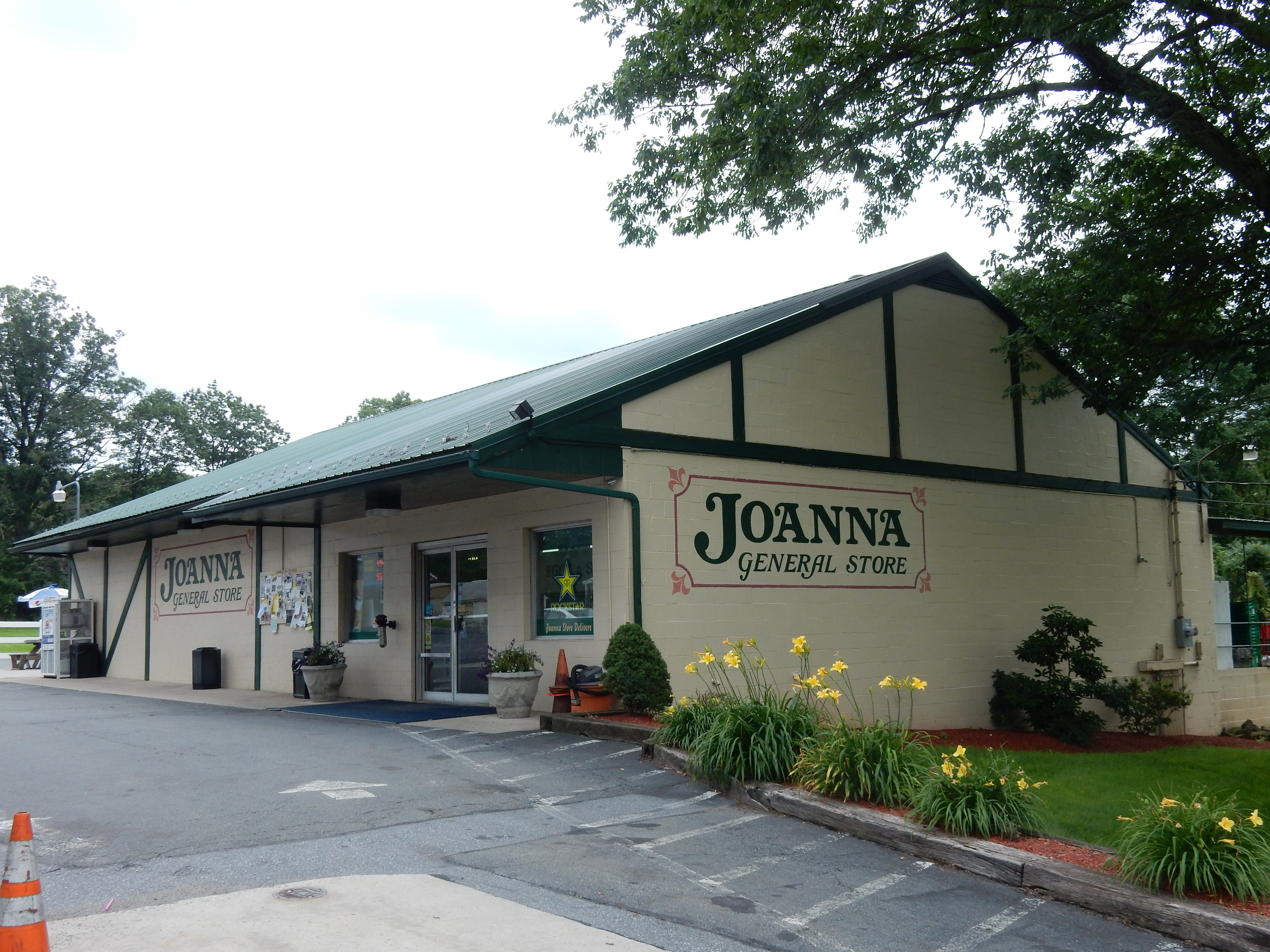
Joanna General Store on Elverson Rd.

Joanna is an unincorporated community in southern Berks County, Pennsylvania, United States. Joanna sits in southern Robeson Township, near the borough of New Morgan, and is also near Caernarvon Township and near the Pennsylvania Turnpike. The Twin Valley School District serves Joanna; the high school is located close to the village.

== History ==
The community was named after the nearby Joanna blast furnace. Joanna Furnace was established in 1791 as a small single-stack charcoal iron furnace. It was named "Joanna" for the wife of Samuel Potts, one of its founders. It was modified and expanded during the 19th century and operated until 1898. The old furnace is preserved as Joanna Furnace Historic Site. A post office called Joanna Furnace was established in 1830, was renamed Joanna in 1890, and the post office was discontinued in 1964.
