= Gibraltar, Pennsylvania =

Unincorporated community in Pennsylvania, US

- Census-designated place
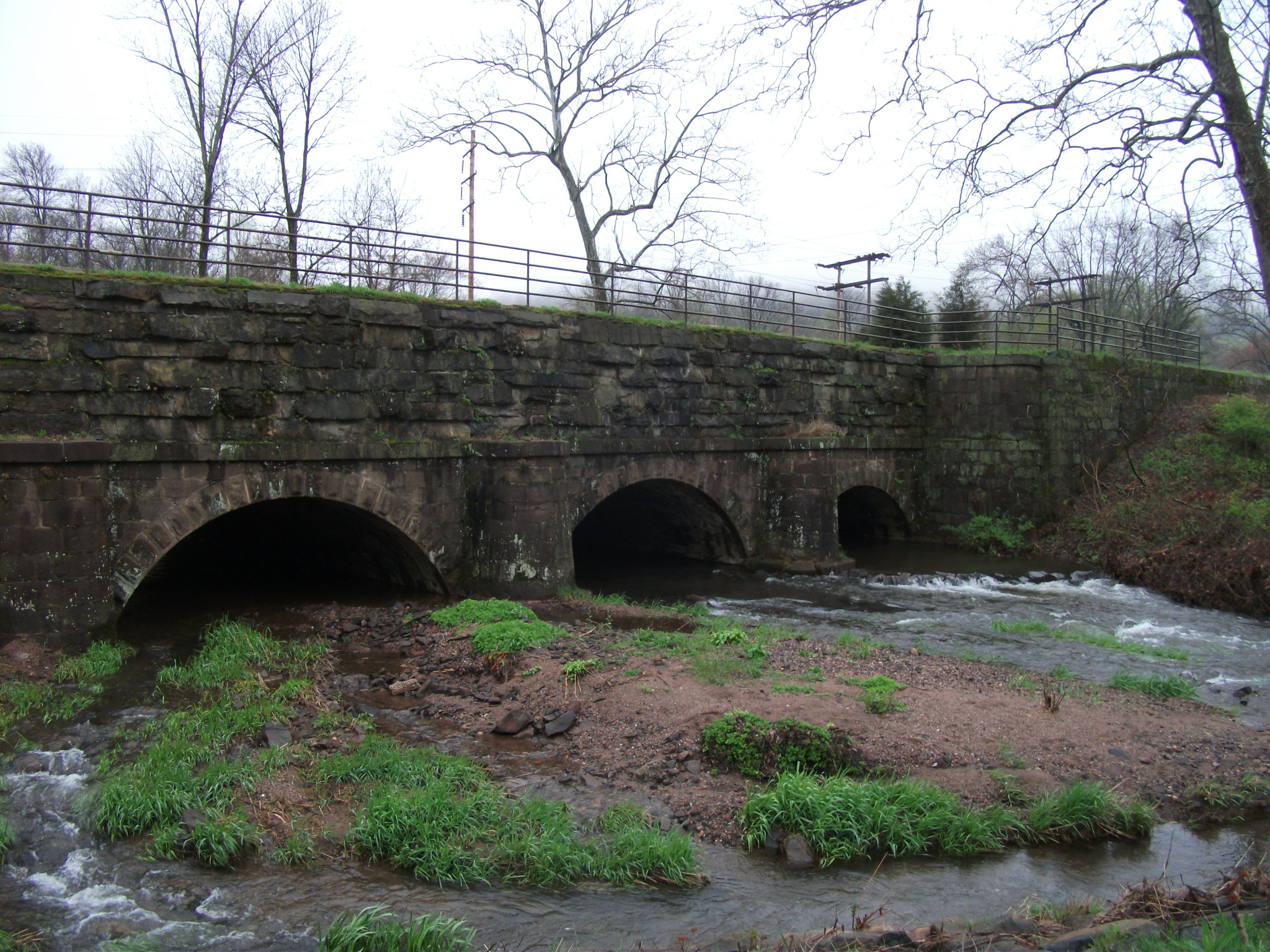
- The Allegheny Aqueduct

- Location within Pennsylvania
- Coordinates: 40°17′03″N 75°52′19″W
- Country: United States
- State: Pennsylvania
- County: Berks
- Township: Robeson

Area
  - Total: 1.24 sq mi (3.20 km^{2})
  - Land: 1.17 sq mi (3.04 km^{2})
  - Water: 0.062 sq mi (0.16 km^{2})
- Elevation: 200 ft (61 m)

Population (2020)
  - Total: 721
  - Density: 613/sq mi (236.8/km^{2})
- Time zone: UTC-5 (Eastern (EST))
  - Summer (DST): UTC-4 (EDT)
- ZIP code: 19508
- Area codes: 610 & 484
- GNIS feature ID: 1175586

Gibraltar is a census-designated place (CDP) in northern Robeson Township in southern Berks County, Pennsylvania, United States. Its population was 680 as of the 2010 census. The community is four miles from Birdsboro and 6.4 miles from downtown Reading. It is served by the Twin Valley School District and is across the Schuylkill River from Exeter.

== Demographics ==
Historical population
Census	Pop.	Note	%±
2020	721		—
U.S. Decennial Census

== History ==
The town is named after Gibraltar, a British territory which is south of Spain. In the mid-18th Century, prior to being named Gibraltar, the place was known as Seideltown. Descendants of Ernst Seidel (an emigrant from Sweden) operated ironworks (forges) in that area.

== Education ==
The school district is Twin Valley School District.

Twin Valley Middle School and Twin Valley High School are in Caernarvon Township, Berks County, and have Elverson postal addresses.
