= Scarlets Mill, Pennsylvania =

Unincorporated community in Pennsylvania, U.S.

Scarlet's Mill, Pennsylvania
- Census-designated place
- Location within Pennsylvania Location within the United States
- Coordinates: 40°13′37″N 75°51′01″W
- Country: United States
- State: Pennsylvania
- County: Berks
- Township: Robeson
- Elevation: 348 ft (106 m)
- Time zone: UTC-5 (Eastern (EST))
  - Summer (DST): UTC-4 (EDT)
- ZIP code: 19508
- Area codes: 610 & 484
- GNIS feature ID: 1213355

Scarlets Mill is an unincorporated community in Robeson Township, Berks County, Pennsylvania, United States. The Twin Valley School District serves the village, whose zip code is 19508. Scarlets Mill is also located up Haycreek Road from the nearby village of Geigertown.

Scarlets Mill was named for John Scarlet.
