= Beckersville, Pennsylvania =

Village in Pennsylvania, US

- Unincorporated community
- Location within Pennsylvania Location within the United States
- Coordinates: 40°13′52″N 75°54′27″W
- Country: United States
- State: Pennsylvania
- County: Berks
- Township: Robeson
- Elevation: 420 ft (130 m)
- Time zone: UTC-5 (Eastern (EST))
  - Summer (DST): UTC-4 (EDT)
- ZIP code: 19540
- Area codes: 610 and 484
- GNIS feature ID: 1169077

Beckersville is a rural village located in the western portion of Robeson Township, in Berks County, Pennsylvania, United States. The village sits upon Pennsylvania Route 10, and next to Interstate 176, which spans from Morgantown to northeastern Cumru Township, just outside Reading. The Twin Valley School District serves the community.

The town was named after Joseph Becker, a German carpenter, who built and ran a hotel in the settlement in 1827.
