= I176 =

I-176 may refer to:

- Interstate 176 or I-176, a road in the United States
- Japanese submarine I-176, a vessel of the Imperial Japanese Navy active in World War II
