= New Morgan, Pennsylvania =

Borough in Pennsylvania, US

- Borough
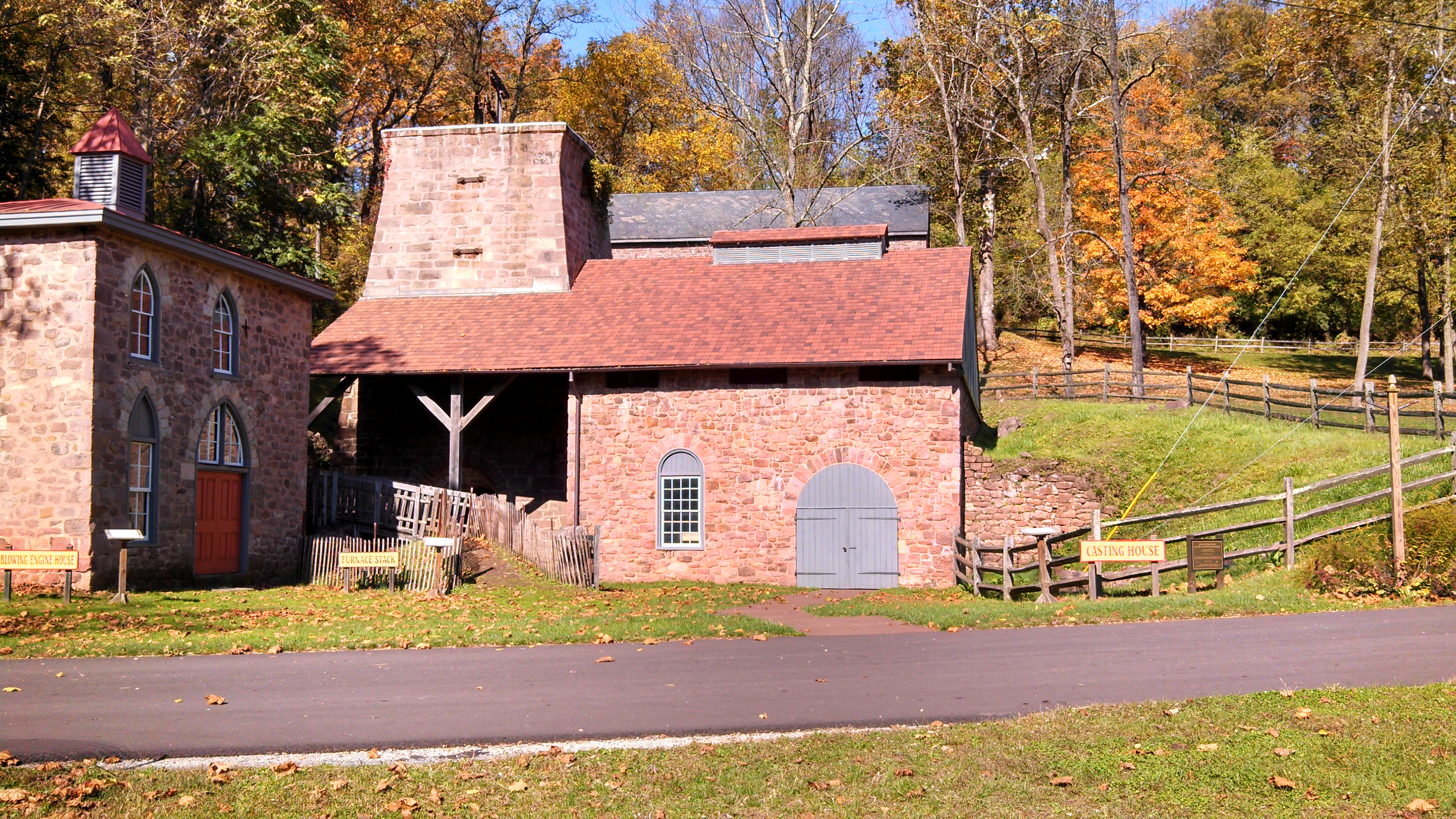
- Joanna Furnace, New Morgan

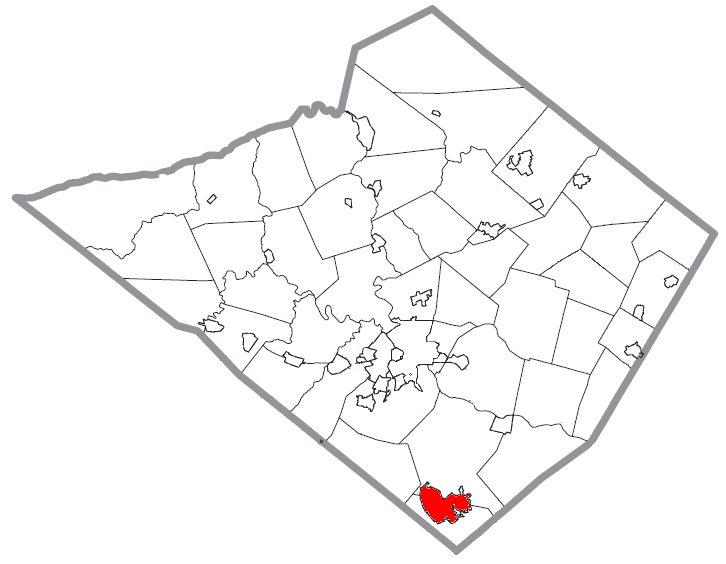
- Location of New Morgan in Berks County, Pennsylvania.

- Location of New Morgan in Pennsylvania New Morgan (the United States)
- Coordinates: 40°10′50″N 75°52′14″W
- Country: United States
- State: Pennsylvania
- County: Berks
- Incorporated: April 1988

Area
  - Total: 5.79 sq mi (14.99 km^{2})
  - Land: 5.51 sq mi (14.27 km^{2})
  - Water: 0.28 sq mi (0.72 km^{2})
- Elevation: 630 ft (190 m)

Population (2020)
  - Total: 54
  - Density: 9.8/sq mi (3.79/km^{2})
- Time zone: UTC-5 (EST)
  - Summer (DST): UTC-4 (EDT)
- Area codes: 610 and 484
- FIPS code: 42-53916
- Website: www.newmorganboro.org

New Morgan is a borough in Berks County, Pennsylvania, United States. The population was 54 at the 2020 census.

== Geography ==
New Morgan is located near the southern corner of Berks County at 40°10′50″N 75°52′14″W (40.180693, -75.870694). It is bordered to the south by Caernarvon Township and to the north by Robeson Township. The unincorporated community of Morgantown is nearby to the south.

According to the U.S. Census Bureau, the borough has a total area of 5.8 square miles (14.9 km^{2}), of which 5.5 square miles (14.2 km^{2}) is land and 0.27 square miles (0.7 km^{2}), or 4.57%, is water.

== Recreation ==
A small portion of Pennsylvania State Game Lands Number 52 is located in New Morgan.

== History ==
In 1987, Raymond Carr, the sole owner of Morgantown Properties, petitioned Berks County Court to create a new borough from 3,500 acres (14 km^{2}) in Caernarvon and Robeson townships. The fate of the proposal was determined by the ten residents living within the boundaries of the proposed borough, most of whom were Carr's tenants. In an April 1988 election, those residents voted 9–1 in favor of forming the new borough. The state's procedures on formation of a new borough have since been revised to require new boroughs to have at least 500 residents.

According to court documents, "[a]side from the landfill and trash to steam plant, Carr propose[d] to develop the new borough with a Victorian village, planned residential developments, a cultural center, a mixed use center, commercial areas, agricultural areas and open space areas. The Victorian village would include a 1,000 room hotel and 18-hole golf course, and would operate year round." Most of the borough's developed land is currently taken up by the Conestoga Landfill, while the Victorian village has yet to be built. Plans were made for the construction of a new residential area in the borough, called Bryn Eyre, as well as a hospital. However, no construction has begun.

== Demographics ==
Historical population
Census	Pop.	Note	%±
1990	36		—
2000	35		−2.8%
2010	71		102.9%
2020	54		−23.9%

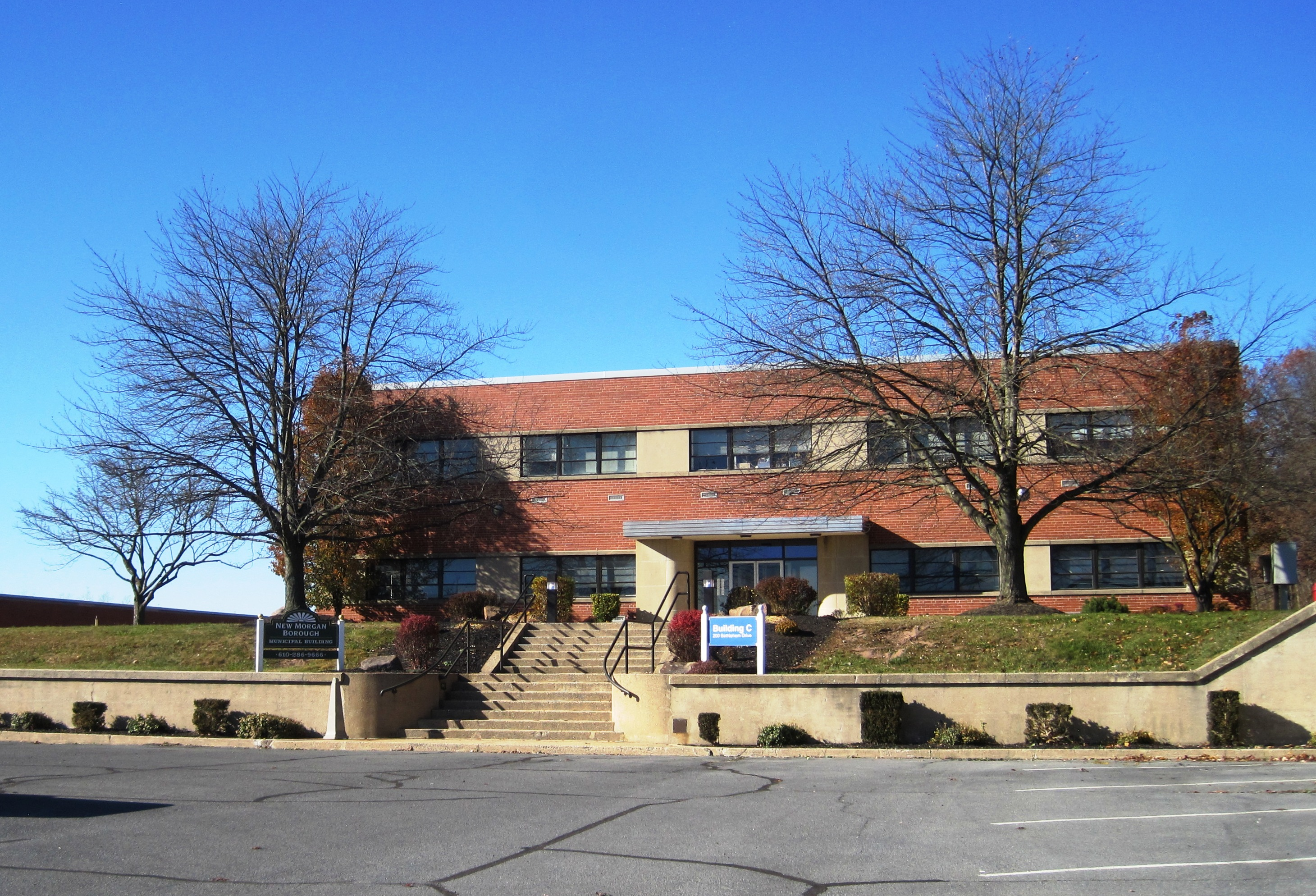
New Morgan Borough Building

As of the census of 2000, there were 35 people, 12 households, and 9 families residing in the borough. The population density was 6.3 people per square mile (2.4/km^{2}). There were 12 housing units at an average density of 2.2 per square mile (0.8/km^{2}). The racial makeup of the borough was 82.86% (29) White, 5.71% (2) African American and 11.43% (4) Asian.

There were 12 households, out of which 50.0% (6) had children under the age of 18 living with them, 41.7% (5) were married couples living together, 16.7% (2) had a female householder with no husband present, and 25.0% (3) were non-families. 25.0% of all households (3) were made up of individuals, and 8.3% (1) had someone living alone who was 65 years of age or older. The average household size was 2.92 and the average family size was 3.33.

In the borough, the population was spread out, with 37.1% (13) under the age of 18, 11.4% (4) from 18 to 24, 31.4% (11) from 25 to 44, 11.4% (4) from 45 to 64, and 8.6% (3) who were 65 years of age or older. The median age was 26 years. For every 100 females, there were 133.3 males. For every 100 females, age 18 and over, there were 120.0 males.

The median income for a household in the borough was $45,250, and the median income for a family was $53,750. Males had a median income of $45,250 versus $22,500 for females. The per capita income for the borough was $27,769. None of the population and none of the families were below the poverty line.

== Education ==
The school district is Twin Valley School District.

Twin Valley Middle School and Twin Valley High School are in Caernarvon Township, Berks County, and have Elverson postal addresses.

== Transportation ==
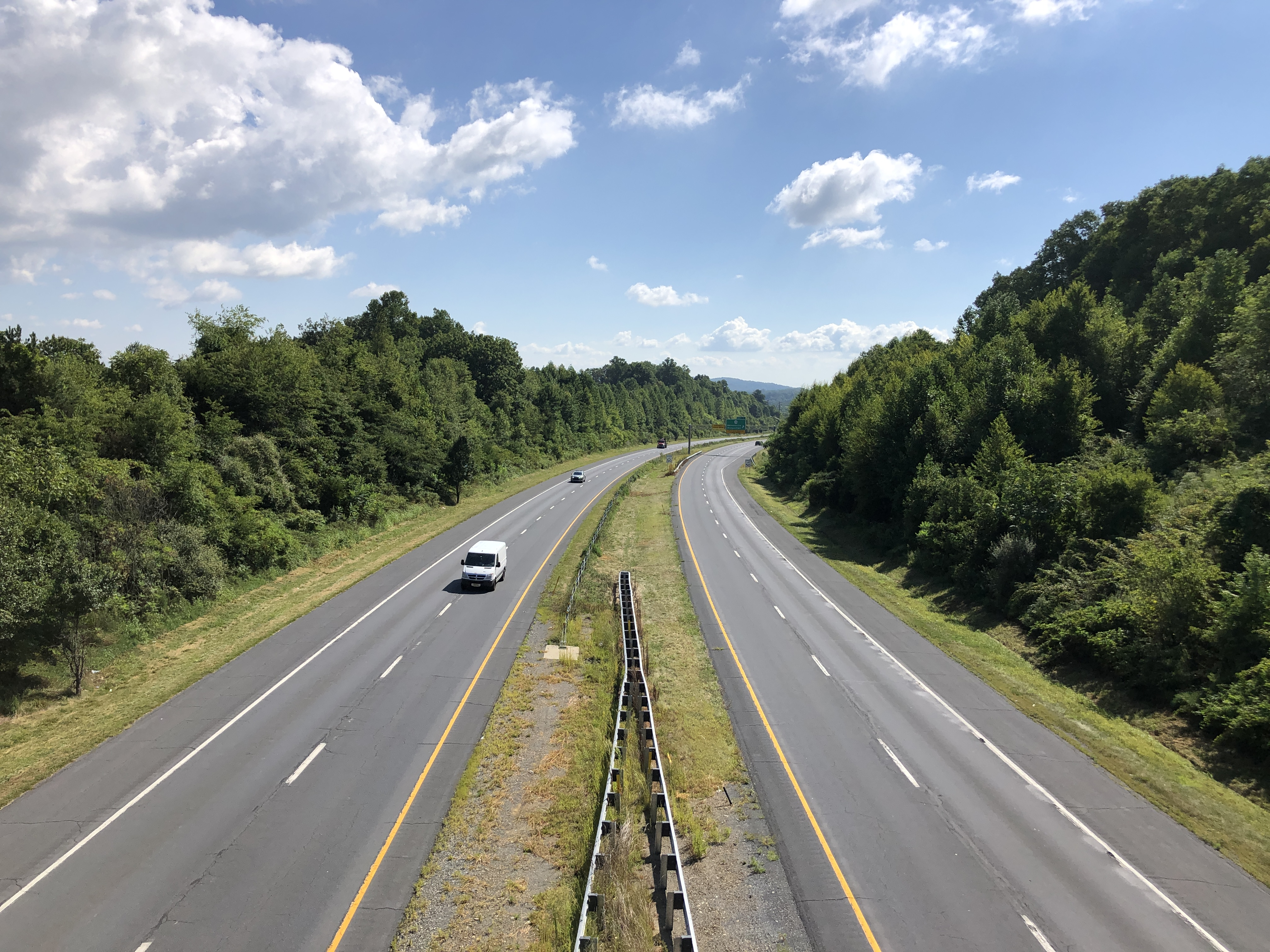
I-176 southbound in New Morgan

As of 2012, there were 4.26 miles (6.86 km) of public roads in New Morgan, of which 3.88 miles (6.24 km) were maintained by the Pennsylvania Department of Transportation (PennDOT) and 0.38 miles (0.61 km) were maintained by the borough.

Interstate 176, also known as the Morgantown Expressway, follows the western edge of the borough and joins Interstate 76, the Pennsylvania Turnpike, just south of the borough at Morgantown. I-176 leads north to Reading, 14 miles (23 km) away. Pennsylvania Route 10, also known as Morgantown Road, runs north–south through the borough, connecting Reading and Morgantown.

== See also ==
- List of towns and boroughs in Pennsylvania
