= Robeson Township, Pennsylvania =

Township in Pennsylvania, US

Robeson Township
- Township
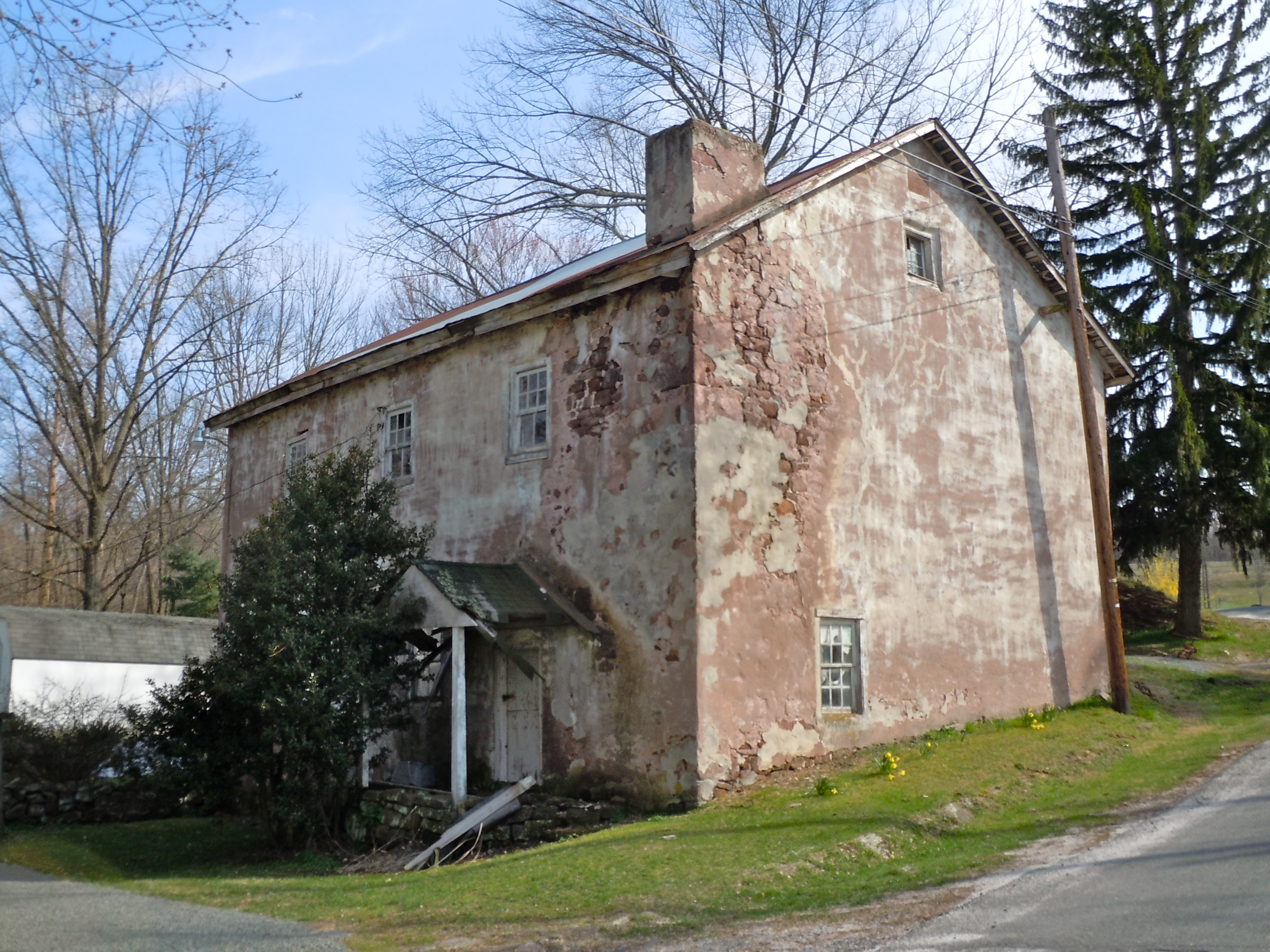
- Geiger Mill in Robenson Township

- Location of Robeson Township in Pennsylvania Robeson Township (the United States)
- Coordinates: 40°15′30″N 75°51′59″W
- Country: United States
- State: Pennsylvania
- County: Berks

Area
  - Total: 34.22 sq mi (88.62 km^{2})
  - Land: 33.92 sq mi (87.85 km^{2})
  - Water: 0.30 sq mi (0.77 km^{2})
- Elevation: 440 ft (130 m)

Population (2010)
  - Total: 7,216
  - Estimate (2016): 7,357
  - Density: 216.9/sq mi (83.75/km^{2})
- Time zone: UTC-5 (EST)
  - Summer (DST): UTC-4 (EDT)
- Area code: 610
- FIPS code: 42-011-65320
- Website: https://www.robesontownship.com/

Robeson Township is a township in Berks County, Pennsylvania, United States. The population was 7,216 at the 2010 census.

== History ==
Robeson Township was named for Andrew Robeson, an early settler.

The Allegheny Aqueduct, Geiger Mill, Joanna Furnace Complex, and Thompson Mill are listed on the National Register of Historic Places.

== Geography ==
According to the U.S. Census Bureau, the township has a total area of 34.1 square miles (88.3 km^{2}), of which 33.9 square miles (87.8 km^{2}) is land and 0.2 square mile (0.5 km^{2}) (0.62%) is water. The township is located in the Hopewell Big Woods. It contains the census-designated place of Gibraltar.

Adjacent townships

- Brecknock Township (west)
- Caernarvon Township (south)
- Cumru Township (northwest)
- Exeter Township (northeast)
- Union Township (east)
- Warwick Township, Chester County
- West Nantmeal Township, Chester County

Adjacent boroughs

- Birdsboro (northeast)
- New Morgan (south)

== Recreation ==
Portions of the French Creek State Park and portions of the Pennsylvania State Game Lands Number 43 are located in the township.

== Demographics ==
At the 2000 census there were 6,869 people, 2,488 households, and 1,965 families living in the township. The population density was 202.6 inhabitants per square mile (78.2/km^{2}). There were 2,568 housing units at an average density of 75.8 per square mile (29.3/km^{2}). The racial makeup of the township was 97.89% White, 0.32% African American, 0.20% Native American, 0.25% Asian, 0.03% Pacific Islander, 0.66% from other races, and 0.66% from two or more races. Hispanic or Latino of any race were 0.87%.

There were 2,488 households, 36.7% had children under the age of 18 living with them, 70.6% were married couples living together, 4.7% had a female householder with no husband present, and 21.0% were non-families. 16.0% of households were made up of individuals, and 6.5% were one person aged 65 or older. The average household size was 2.76 and the average family size was 3.11.

Historical population
Census	Pop.	Note	%±
1980	4,729		—
1990	5,954		25.9%
2000	6,869		15.4%
2010	7,216		5.1%
2016 (est.)	7,357		2.0%
Source: US Census Bureau

The age distribution was 26.7% under the age of 18, 5.7% from 18 to 24, 29.8% from 25 to 44, 26.5% from 45 to 64, and 11.3% 65 or older. The median age was 39 years. For every 100 females there were 102.0 males. For every 100 females age 18 and over, there were 101.5 males.

The median household income was $54,395 and the median family income was $60,154. Males had a median income of $48,068 versus $28,904 for females. The per capita income for the township was $22,550. About 3.2% of families and 4.2% of the population were below the poverty line, including 5.3% of those under age 18 and 2.5% of those age 65 or over.

== Transportation ==
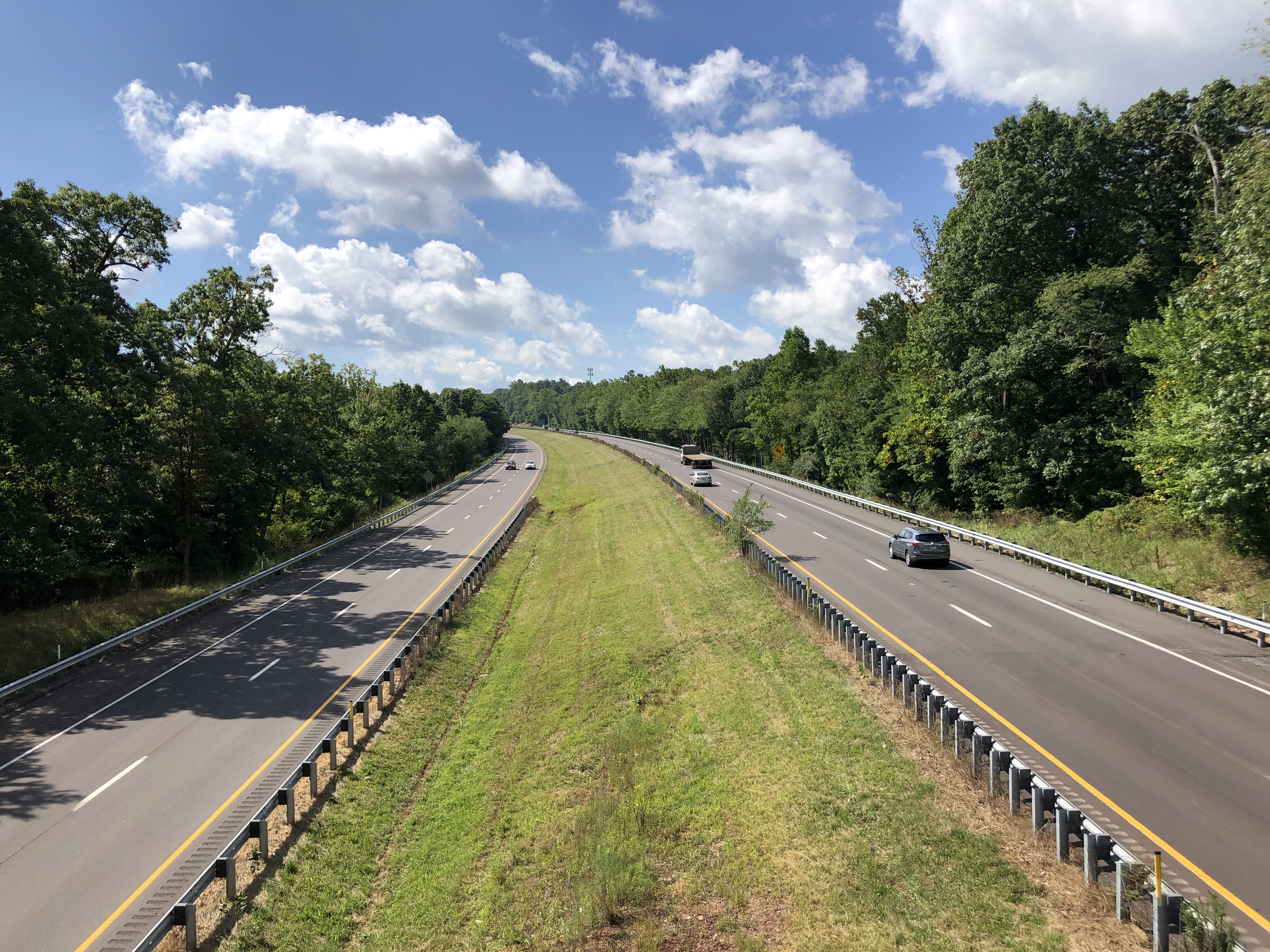
I-176 southbound in Robeson Township

As of 2014, there were 107.58 miles (173.13 km) of public roads in Robeson Township, of which 30.12 miles (48.47 km) were maintained by the Pennsylvania Department of Transportation (PennDOT) and 77.46 miles (124.66 km) were maintained by the township.

Interstate 176 is the most prominent highway serving Robeson Township. It follows the Morgantown Expressway along a north–south alignment across the western portion of the township. Pennsylvania Route 10 follows Morgantown Road on a route mostly parallel to, and in close proximity to, I-176. Pennsylvania Route 568 follows Kurtz Mill Road, Morgantown Road and Green Hills Road along a southwest–northeast alignment across the northwestern portion of the township, including a short concurrency with PA 10. Finally, Pennsylvania Route 724 follows Main Street along a northwest–southeast alignment across the northern part of the township.

== Education ==
The school district is Twin Valley School District. Robeson Elementary Center is in the township. Twin Valley Middle School and Twin Valley High School are in Caernarvon Township, Berks County, and have Elverson postal addresses.

== Township villages ==
- Beckersville
- Geigertown
- Gibraltar
- Green Hills
- Joanna
- Joanna Heights
- Plowville
- Scarlets Mill

== Notable person ==
- Mary J. Scarlett Dixon (1822–1900), physician
