= Joanna Furnace Complex =

- U.S. National Register of Historic Places
- U.S. Historic district
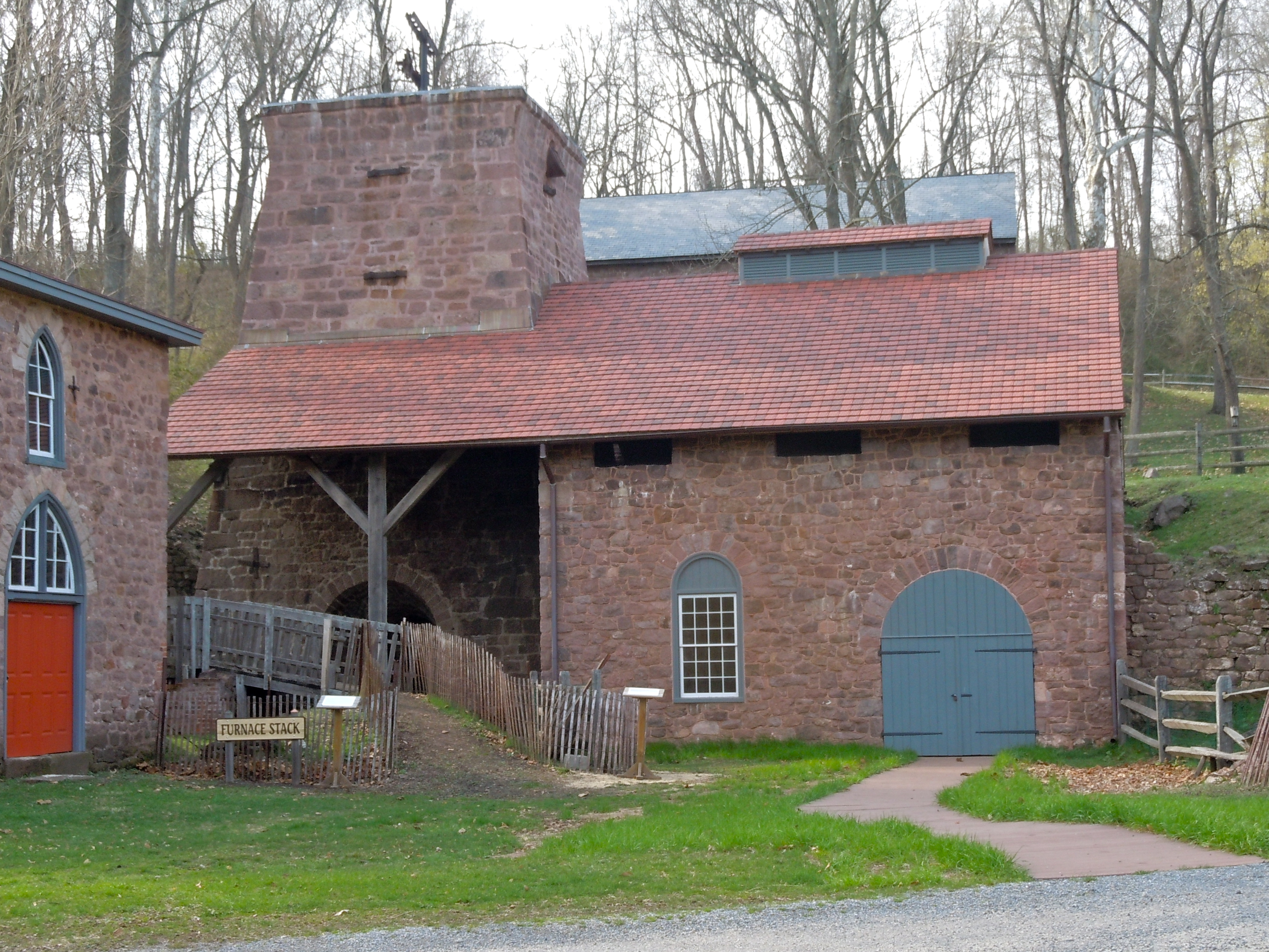

- Location within Pennsylvania Location within the United States
- Nearest city: Morgantown, Pennsylvania
- Coordinates: 40°11′28″N 75°53′22″W
- Area: 13.8 acres (5.6 ha)
- Architect: Potts, Samuel; Rutter, Thomas
- NRHP reference No.: 80003426
- Added to NRHP: April 23, 1980

The Joanna Furnace Complex was an iron furnace that operated from 1792 (234 years ago) to 1901 (125 years ago) in Robeson Township, Berks County, Pennsylvania. It was founded by Samuel Potts and Thomas Rutter III (grandson of Thomas Rutter) and named for Potts's wife Joanna.

The furnace and its associated buildings were listed as a historic district by the National Register of Historic Places in 1980.

== History ==
After the Civil War ended, the charcoal-fired furnace was owned by Clement Grubb's son-in-law, L. Heber Smith, a former colonel who married Clement's daughter Ella Jane Brooke Grubb in 1868. It then passed through several hands before Smith took ownership, possibly after the war and before his marriage to Ella Jane. It is likely that the Grubbs assisted with the furnace's major technological upgrade in 1889, when his wife inherited her father's sizable estate that year.

The furnace continued in operation under Smith until it was "blown out" after his death in 1898 at the age of sixty-one. The furnace was acquired by Bethlehem Steel, which deeded it to the Hay Creek Valley Historical Association in 1979. The ruins have been preserved and are open to visitors.

== See also ==
- French Creek State Park
- Hopewell Furnace National Historic Site

== Gallery ==
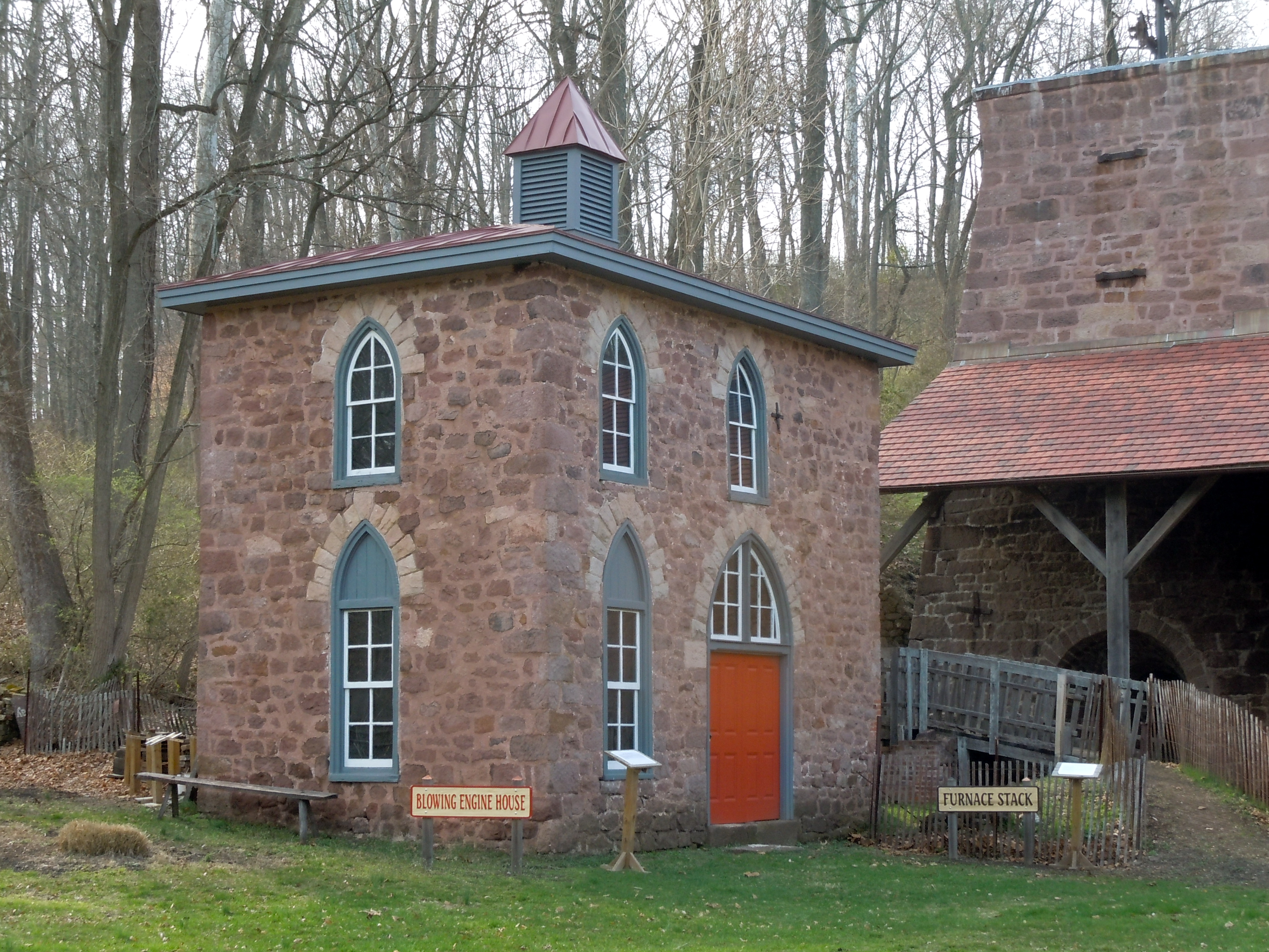
Blowing Engine House
