= Morgantown Historic District (Morgantown, Pennsylvania) =

Historic district in Pennsylvania, United States

- U.S. National Register of Historic Places
- U.S. Historic district
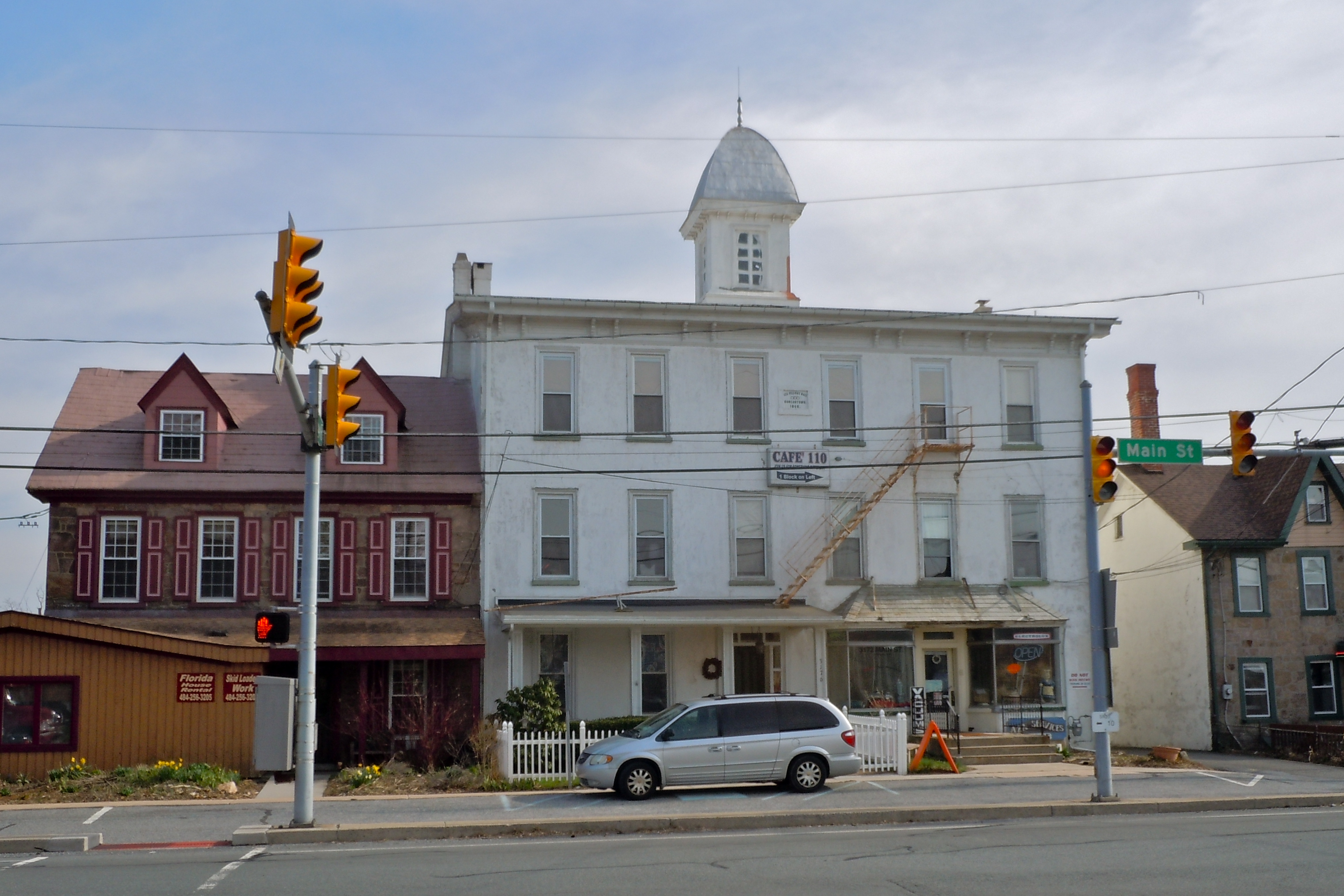
- Morgantown Oddfellows Building, April 2011

- Location within Pennsylvania Location within the United States
- Location: Roughly, area surrounding Main St. between Walnut and Washington Sts., Caernarvon Township, Pennsylvania
- Coordinates: 40°09′20″N 75°53′25″W
- Area: 21.3 acres (8.6 ha)
- Architectural style: Georgian, Late Victorian, Late 19th And Early 20th Century American Movements
- NRHP reference No.: 95001255
- Added to NRHP: November 7, 1995

The Morgantown Historic District, also known as the Old Main Street Historic District, is a national historic district that is located in Caernarvon Township, Berks County, Pennsylvania.

It was listed on the National Register of Historic Places in 1995.

== History and architectural features ==
The district encompasses 104 contributing buildings, one contributing structure, and one contributing object in the village of Morgantown. These structures were built between 1790 and 1945, and are residential, commercial, and institutional buildings that were designed in a variety of popular architectural styles, including Georgian and Late Victorian. The oldest buildings were built primarily from brown sandstone. A primarily residential district, notable non-residential buildings include a tavern/hotel (c. 1800), an I.O.O.F. lodge/town meeting hall (1868), the Morgantown Garage (1920), and a fire hall (1921). Also located in the district are a contributing cemetery and war memorial.
