= Conestoga Christian School =

Location
- 2760 Main Street; Morgantown, Pennsylvania 19543; Lancaster County; United States
- 40.1492°N 75.9074°W

Information
- Type: Private
- Religious affiliation: Christian
- Established: 1952
- Head of school: Ken Parris
- Faculty: 50
- Grades: PK-12
- Enrollment: 400
- Colors: Grey and maroon
- Athletics: Baseball, soccer, basketball, lacrosse, track and field
- Website: www.conestogachristian.net

Conestoga Christian School (/ˈkɒnɪˈstoʊɡə/; also known as CCS) is a private Christian school located in Morgantown, Pennsylvania, United States. Founded in 1952 as an extension of the educational ministry of the Conestoga Mennonite Church, CCS is a non-profit organization providing education for K-12th grade students. The school is accredited by both Association of Christian Schools International (ACSI) and Middle States Association (MSA), and belongs to Mid-Atlantic Christian Schools Association (MACSA) and Lancaster Area Council of Mennonite Schools (LACMS). Conestoga Christian is staffed by 35 faculty members and enrollment is currently 325 students.

In 2005 a new high school wing was added, including high school classrooms, a middle school science room, an enlarged media center, a new computer lab, and centralized office areas.

== History ==
Conestoga Christian was created in 1952, as a result of the growing Christian school movement in the area and complaints regarding a proposed television to be put into public schools in the Honey Brook District. The school's founders were part of the Conestoga Mennonite Church. Initially, a temporary constitution was written by a three-person committee, and a board of trustees was elected. Members of the board included Harvey Beiler, Chairman; Omar Stolzfus, Vice-Chairman; and John C. Kurtz, Secretary. The board members rented a small, one-room schoolhouse (the Conestoga Schoolhouse, built on what is now a field). The school's first teacher was Laura Kurtz. Tuition was set at $175 a year and the teachers' salary was set at $180 a month. In the first year (fall of 1952), 27 pupils were in attendance.

Conestoga Christian grew rapidly over the next year, adding a 9th grade and an $18,000 two-room building on Route 23, across from the Conestoga Mennonite Church. The school's second teacher, Elsie Petersheim, was hired. The number of students nearly doubled as interest from the community grew. By 1957, the school had ten grades and a third room, where Harry Hertzler taught and served as principal. In 1962, Conestoga Christian Day School operated in a four-room building with a basement. There were five full-time teachers, 112 students in first through tenth grades, a school newsletter, home economics and woodshop classes, a vending machine, a newly stocked science lab, and monthly fire drills.

=== Later developments ===
In 2005 the school completed a new high school wing including high school classrooms, a middle school science room, an enlarged media center, a new computer lab, and centralized office areas. Conestoga Christian celebrated their 55th anniversary in 2006. In 2008 the middle school computer lab was renovated. All computers were replaced with newer models.

== Academics ==
Conestoga Christian is notable for its strong electives program, two new computer labs, and a strong language arts base in primary grades. The school is parent-run.

In 2007 the College Board announced that high school calculus and biology courses at Conestoga Christian had been authorized to use the Advanced Placement (AP) designation for the 2007-2008 academic year.
