= Elverson Historic District =

Historic district in Pennsylvania, United States

- U.S. National Register of Historic Places
- U.S. Historic district
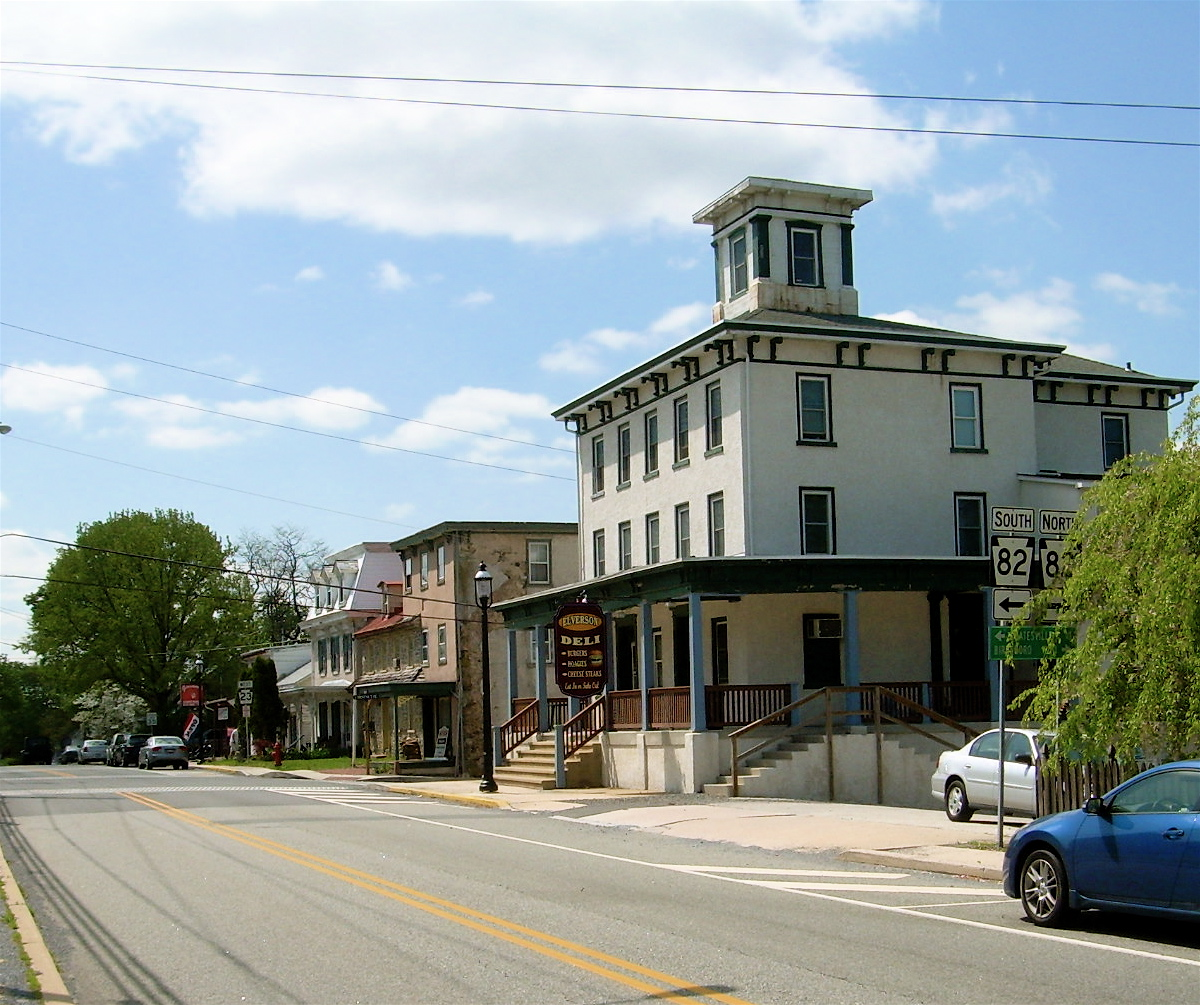
- Elverson Historic District, 2006

- Location within Pennsylvania Location within the United States
- Location: Main, Chestnut and Hall Sts. and Park Ave., Elverson, Pennsylvania
- Coordinates: 40°09′24″N 75°49′56″W
- Area: 61 acres (25 ha)
- Built: 1870
- Architectural style: Bungalow/craftsman, Georgian, Gothic Revival
- NRHP reference No.: 93000354
- Added to NRHP: April 29, 1993

Elverson Historic District is a national historic district located in Elverson, Chester County, Pennsylvania. The district includes 133 contributing buildings, 3 contributing sites, and 4 contributing structures in the central business district and surrounding residential areas of Elverson. The district includes a variety of residential, commercial, and institutional buildings with examples of Bungalow/craftsman, Georgian, and Gothic Revival architecture. Contributing buildings date from about 1750 to about 1930. Notable buildings include "The Bank House" (c. 1750), train station (1870), Springfield M.E. Church (1869), Blue Rock Hotel (1860), Dengler Bro. Store (c. 1870), Whoye Horse Tavern (1811), The Creamery (1906), and Springfield School (1873). One of the contributing structures is the railroad car "Baltimore County."

It was added to the National Register of Historic Places in 1993.
