= Geiger Mill =

- U.S. National Register of Historic Places
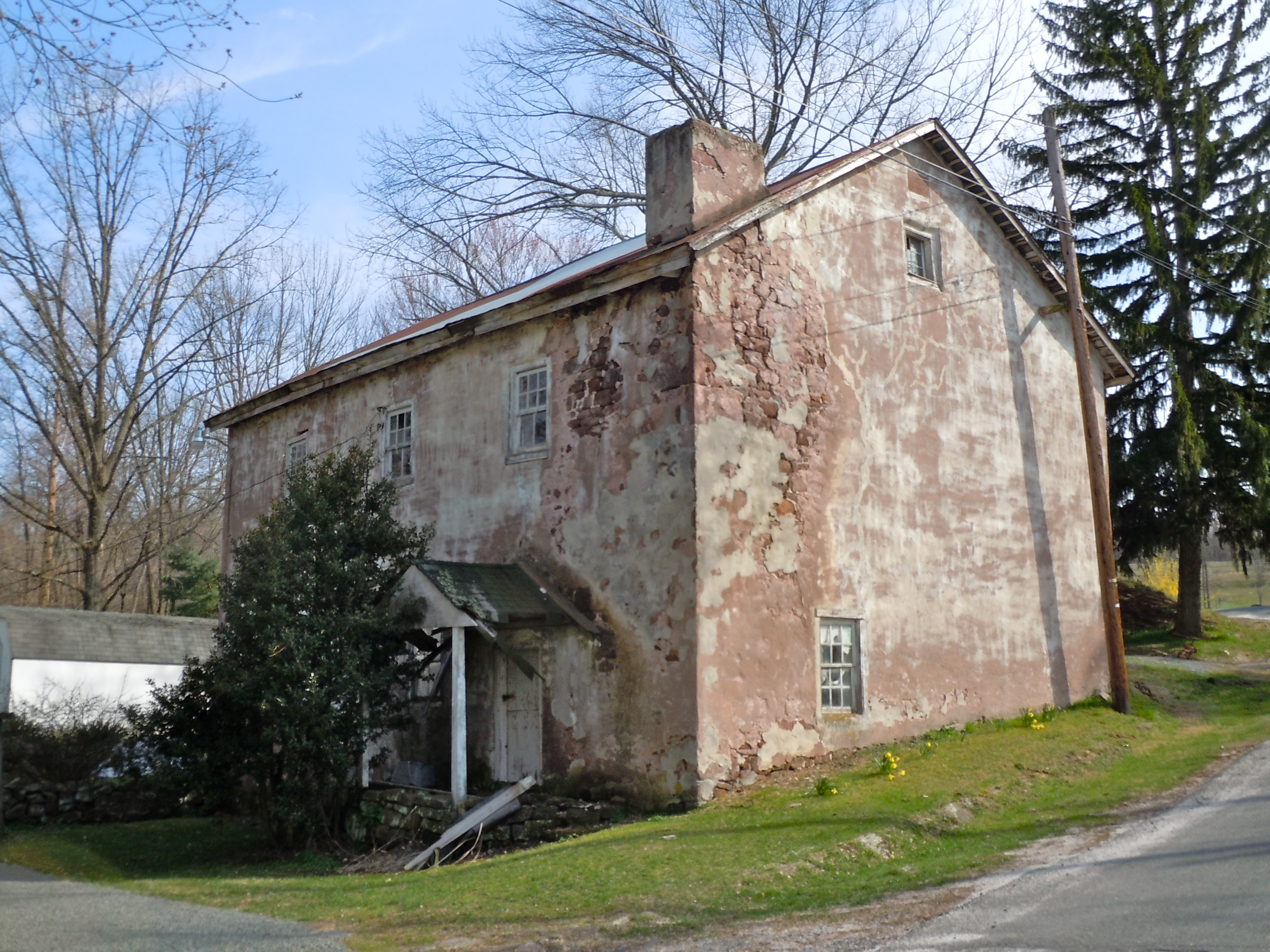
- Geiger Mill, April 2011

- Location within Pennsylvania Location within the United States
- Location: Jct. of Mill Rd. and PA 82, Robeson Township, Pennsylvania
- Coordinates: 40°12′00″N 75°50′15″W
- Area: 1.8 acres (0.73 ha)
- Built: 1783
- Architectural style: Gristmill
- MPS: Gristmills in Berks County MPS
- NRHP reference No.: 90001738
- Added to NRHP: November 8, 1990

Geiger Mill is a historic grist mill located in Robeson Township, Berks County, Pennsylvania. The mill was built in 1783, and is a 2 1/2-story, with basement, banked stucco-over-stone building. The adjacent miller's house was built about 1783, and is a 2 1/2-story, stucco-over-stone dwelling. Also on the property is a contributing one-story, stucco-over-stone smokehouse. The mill ceased operations about 1919.

It was listed on the National Register of Historic Places in 1990.
