= Morgantown, Pennsylvania =

Unincorporated community in Pennsylvania, US

- Census-designated place
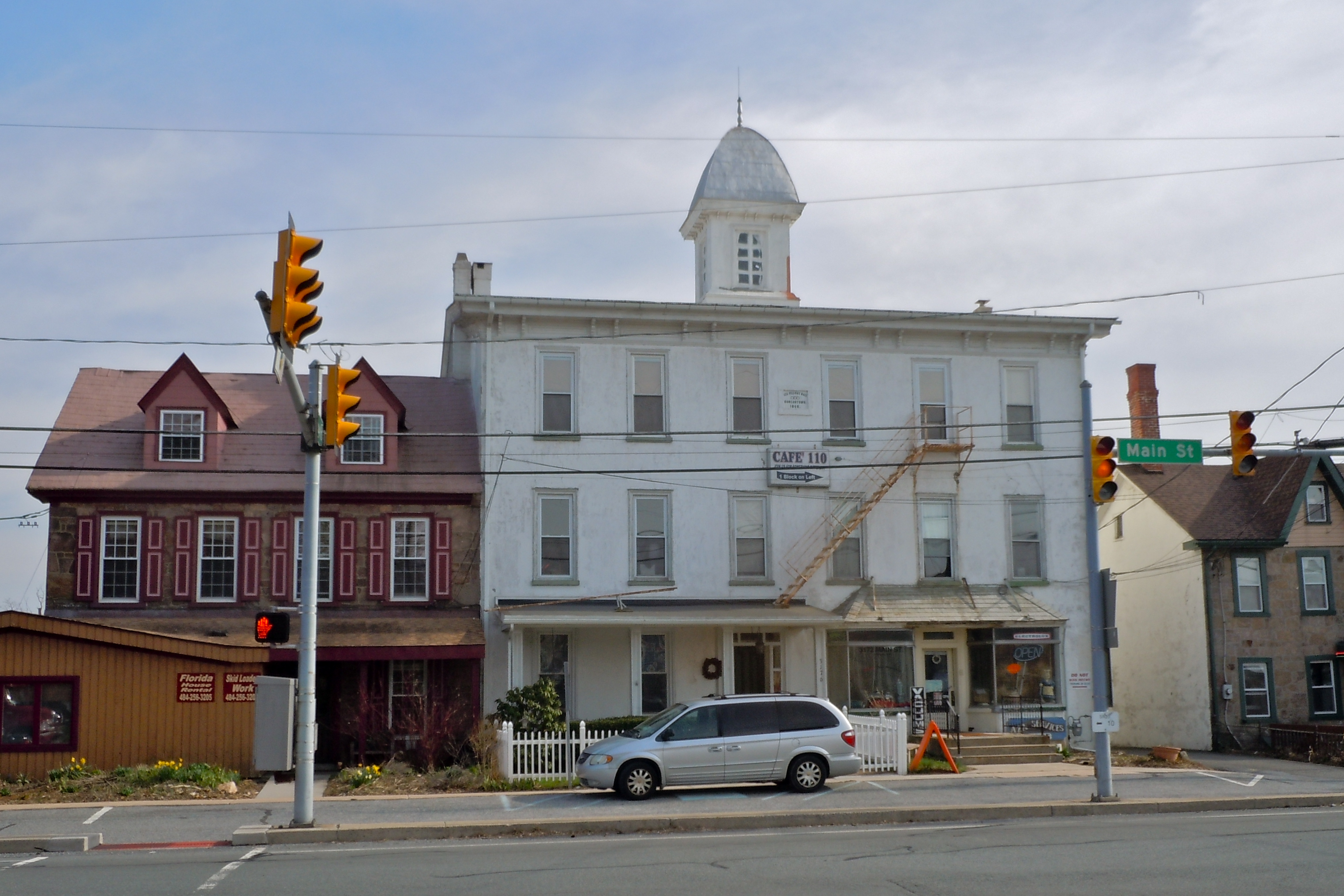
- Odd Fellows Hall

- Location within Pennsylvania Location within the United States
- Coordinates: 40°09′18″N 75°53′24″W
- Country: United States
- State: Pennsylvania
- Counties: Berks, Lancaster
- Townships: Caernarvon, Caernarvon

Area
  - Total: 1.14 sq mi (2.95 km^{2})
  - Land: 1.14 sq mi (2.95 km^{2})
  - Water: 0 sq mi (0.00 km^{2})
- Elevation: 600 ft (180 m)

Population (2020)
  - Total: 1,614
  - Density: 1,420/sq mi (548/km^{2})
- Time zone: UTC-5 (Eastern (EST))
  - Summer (DST): UTC-4 (EDT)
- ZIP Code: 19543
- Area codes: 610 and 484
- FIPS code: 42-51016
- GNIS feature ID: 1181556

Morgantown is a census-designated place in Caernarvon Township, located in southern Berks County, Pennsylvania, United States. It is located partially in Caernarvon Township in Lancaster County. As of the 2020 census, the population was 1,541 residents.

== History ==
Morgantown was named after Colonel Jacob Morgan, who laid out the town around 1770. His father, Thomas Morgan, had been a native of Wales, a captain in the French and Indian War, and owner of a large tract of choice land in Caernarvon Township. Jacob Morgan settled in this area around 1765, building a large stone house, which still stands on Hartz Road between Mineview Drive and Shiloh Road. It is rumored to have housed George Washington during a brief overnight visit. The house has been restored by its owners.

Morgantown was, until the arrival of the Pennsylvania Turnpike, a mostly agriculture-based settlement. Now it is much larger and busier with the settlement of several manufacturing companies, including Timet, Morgan Corp. Stoltzfus Spreaders, Viwinco Windows and McNeilus cement mixers. Other aspects of the town have grown too, especially the roads. In the 1970s the Morgantown Expressway Interstate 176 was built to interstate highway standards, providing a link between Morgantown and PA 23 and Reading and US 422.

Conestoga Christian School and High Point Baptist Academy are based in the area. Also, although not actually in Morgantown but part of its neighboring town, Elverson, Twin Valley High School overlooks parts of Morgantown and is where most of the town's children attend school.

In 1987, an entrepreneur named Raymond Carr laid out plans for New Morgan which was incorporated into a borough in 1988. The borough currently has 54 residents, and the actual town has yet to be built.

== Geography ==
Morgantown is drained by the Conestoga River, which flows westward into the Susquehanna River. The confluence of multiple sources occurs in Morgantown. It has a hot-summer humid continental climate (Dfa) and is in hardiness zone 6b. Average monthly temperatures range from 29.6 °F in January to 73.8 °F in July.

== Demographics ==
Historical population
Census	Pop.	Note	%±
2020	1,614		—
U.S. Decennial Census

== Economy ==
Morgantown has a small public airport called Morgantown Airport east of the center of town, which has since been closed. (since then, the airport has been demolished to make way for a new housing development)

Morgantown Center is an event facility adjacent to the Pennsylvania Turnpike. The Center houses "Classic Auto Mall", a large classic car consignment house.

Morgantown is home to Hollywood Casino Morgantown, a mini-casino owned by Penn National Gaming. The 80,000-square-foot (7,400 m^{2}) casino has 750 slot machines and 30 table games. It opened on December 22, 2021.

== Education ==
The school district for the Berks County section is Twin Valley School District. Twin Valley Middle School and Twin Valley High School are in Caernarvon Township, Berks County, and have Elverson postal addresses.

The school district for the Lancaster County section is Eastern Lancaster County School District.

== Cultural references ==
The earliest mention of Groundhog Day is an entry on February 2, 1840, in the diary of James L. Morris of Morgantown, in Pennsylvania Dutch Country, according to a book on the subject by Don Yoder. This was a Welsh enclave but the diarist was commenting on his neighbors who were of German stock. February 2, 1840, read: "Today the Germans say the groundhog comes out of his winter quarters and if he sees his shadow he returns in and remains there 40 days." Some sources stated that Morris's entry of February 4, 1841, was the oldest. It read: "Last Tuesday, the 2nd, was Candlemas day, the day on which, according to the Germans, the Groundhog peeps out of his winter quarters and if he sees his shadow he pops back for another six weeks nap, but if the day be cloudy he remains out, as the weather is to be moderate."

In the opening scene of Master of the World (1961), just before an explosion on a nearby mountain, a character in a fictionalized 19th-century Morgantown declares:

We're living in a cemetery. This is the most boring and monotonous town in the entire United States -- Morgantown, Pennsylvania. A place where nothing can possibly happen.

== Notable person ==
Actress Shayna Rose was born in Morgantown.

== See also ==
- List of census-designated places in Pennsylvania
