= Allegheny Aqueduct =

- U.S. National Register of Historic Places
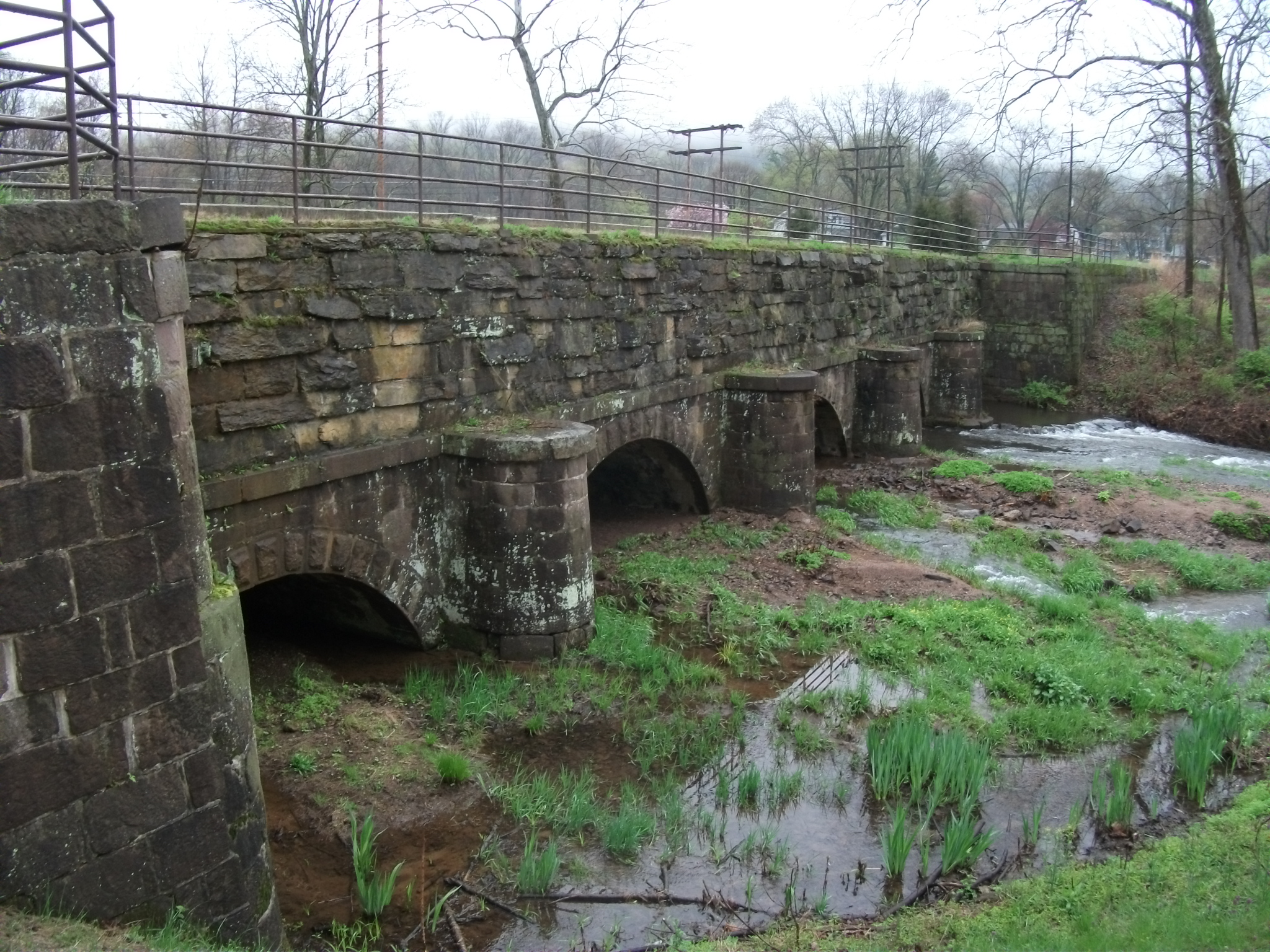
- Allegheny Aqueduct. April 2011.

- Location within Pennsylvania Location within the United States
- Location: Pennsylvania Route 724 and Allegheny Creek at Gibraltar, Robeson Township, Pennsylvania
- Coordinates: 40°17′10″N 75°52′29″W
- Area: 1 acre (0.40 ha)
- Built: 1824
- Built by: Beecher, Ephraim; Pettitt & Kimber
- NRHP reference No.: 84003105
- Added to NRHP: February 23, 1984

Allegheny Aqueduct, also known as Gibraltar Aqueduct, is a historic stone aqueduct located at Robeson Township in Berks County, Pennsylvania. It was built in 1824 and is about 260-foot-long (79 m) and 70-foot-wide (21 m). It was built as part of the Schuylkill Navigation Company canal system to carry canal boats across the Allegheny Creek. It is supported by a stone arch bridge structure with five spans. The aqueduct was in operation until 1928 and drained in 1967.

It was listed on the National Register of Historic Places in 1984.

== Gallery ==
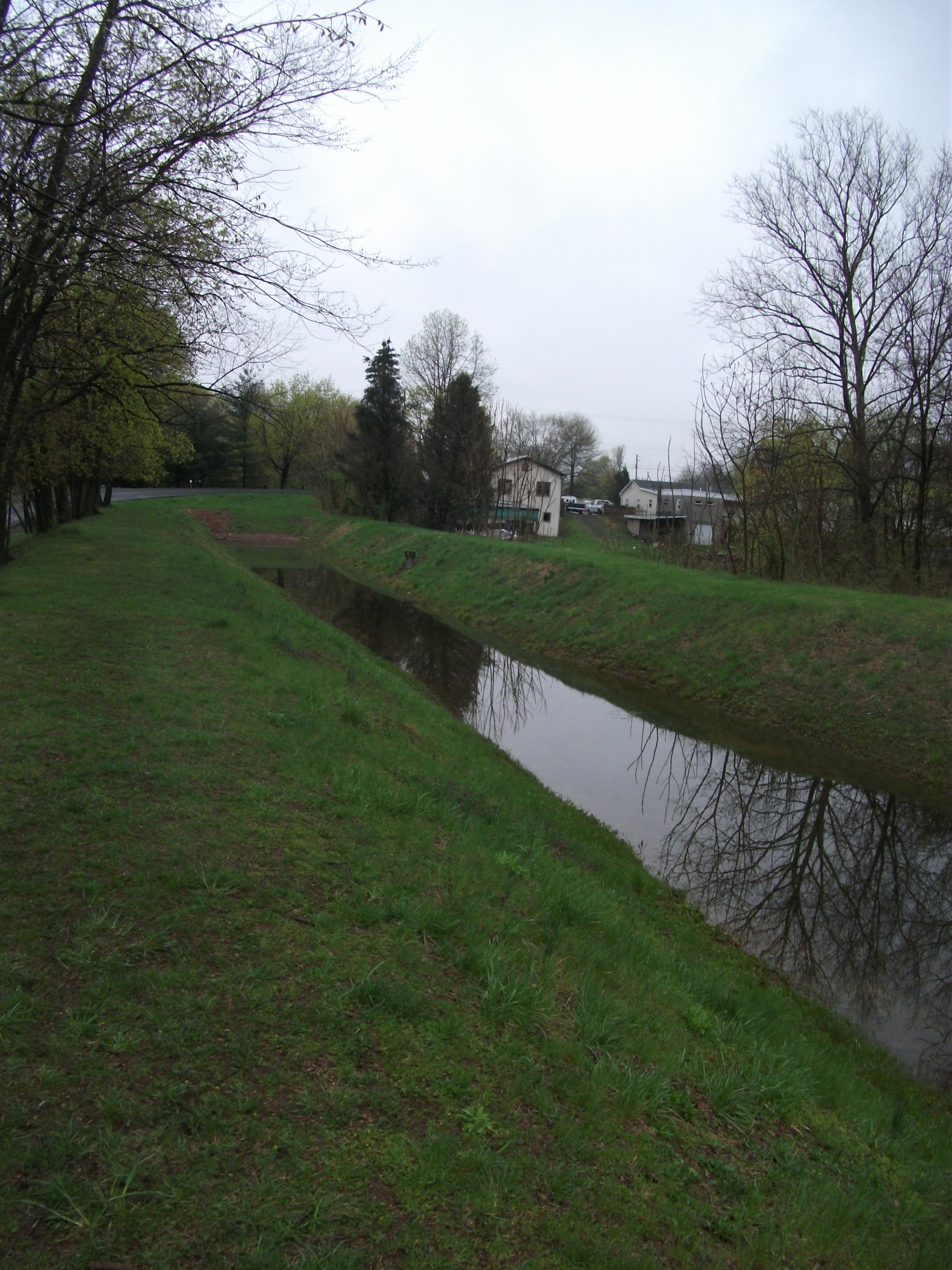

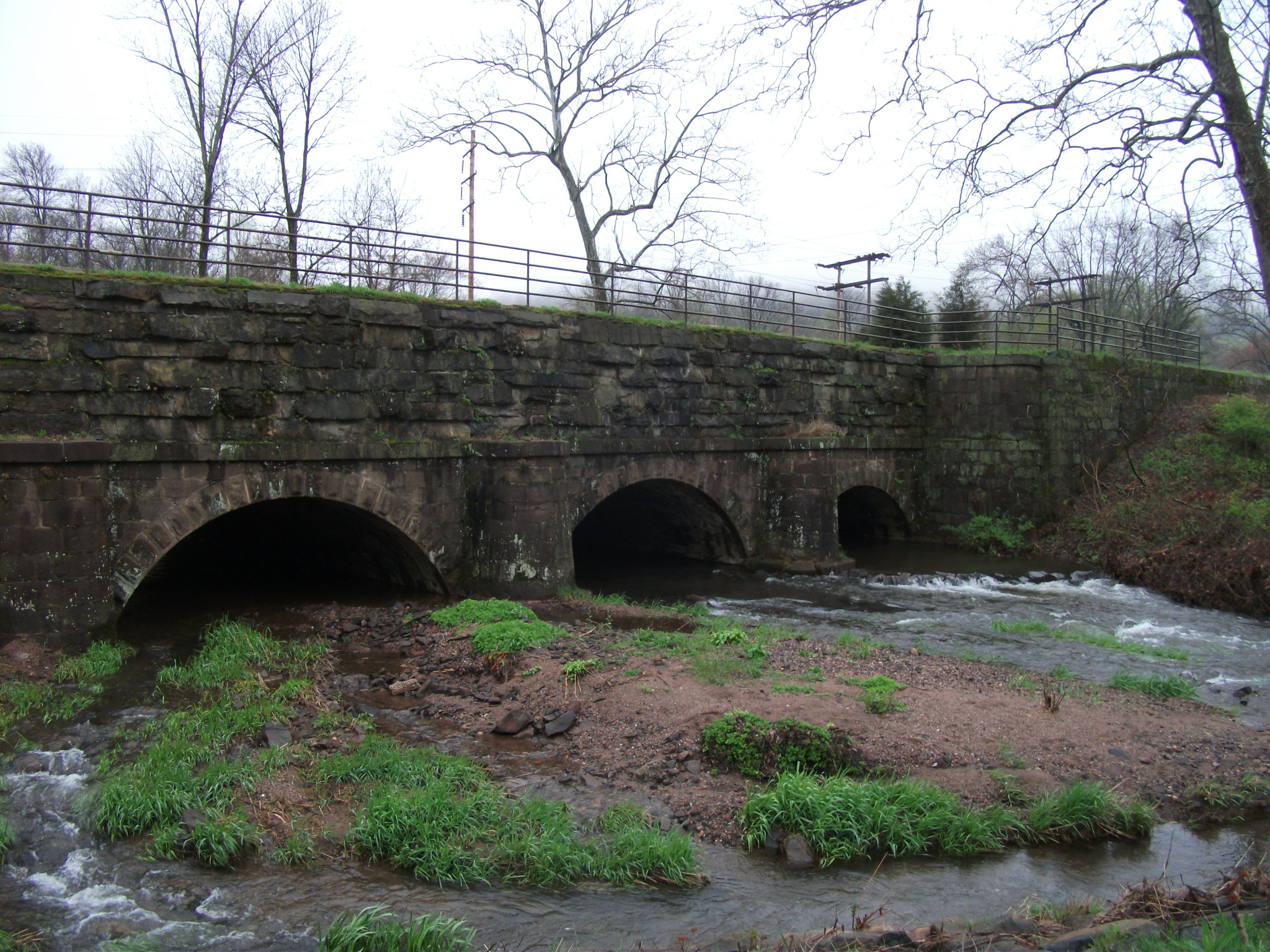

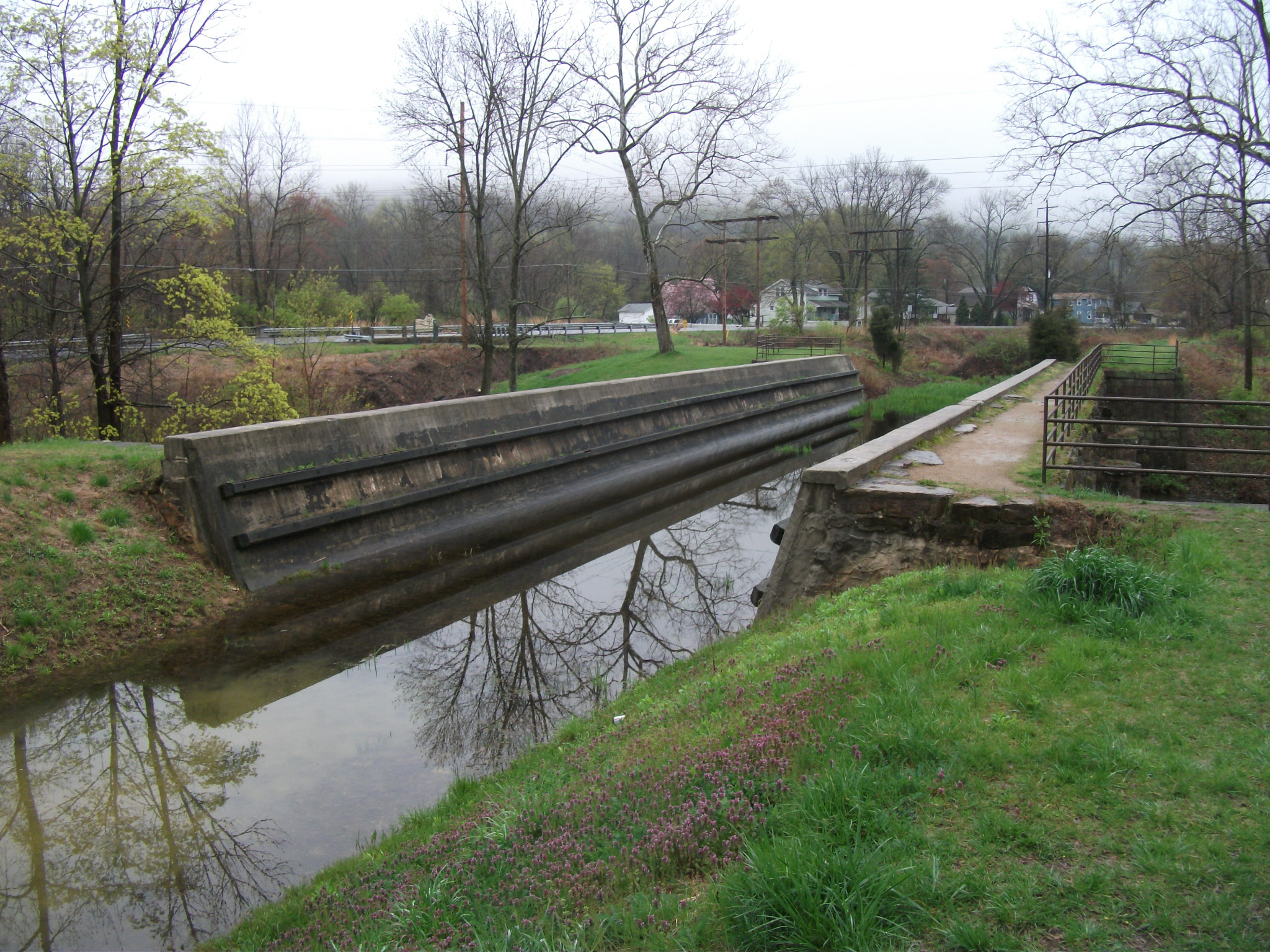

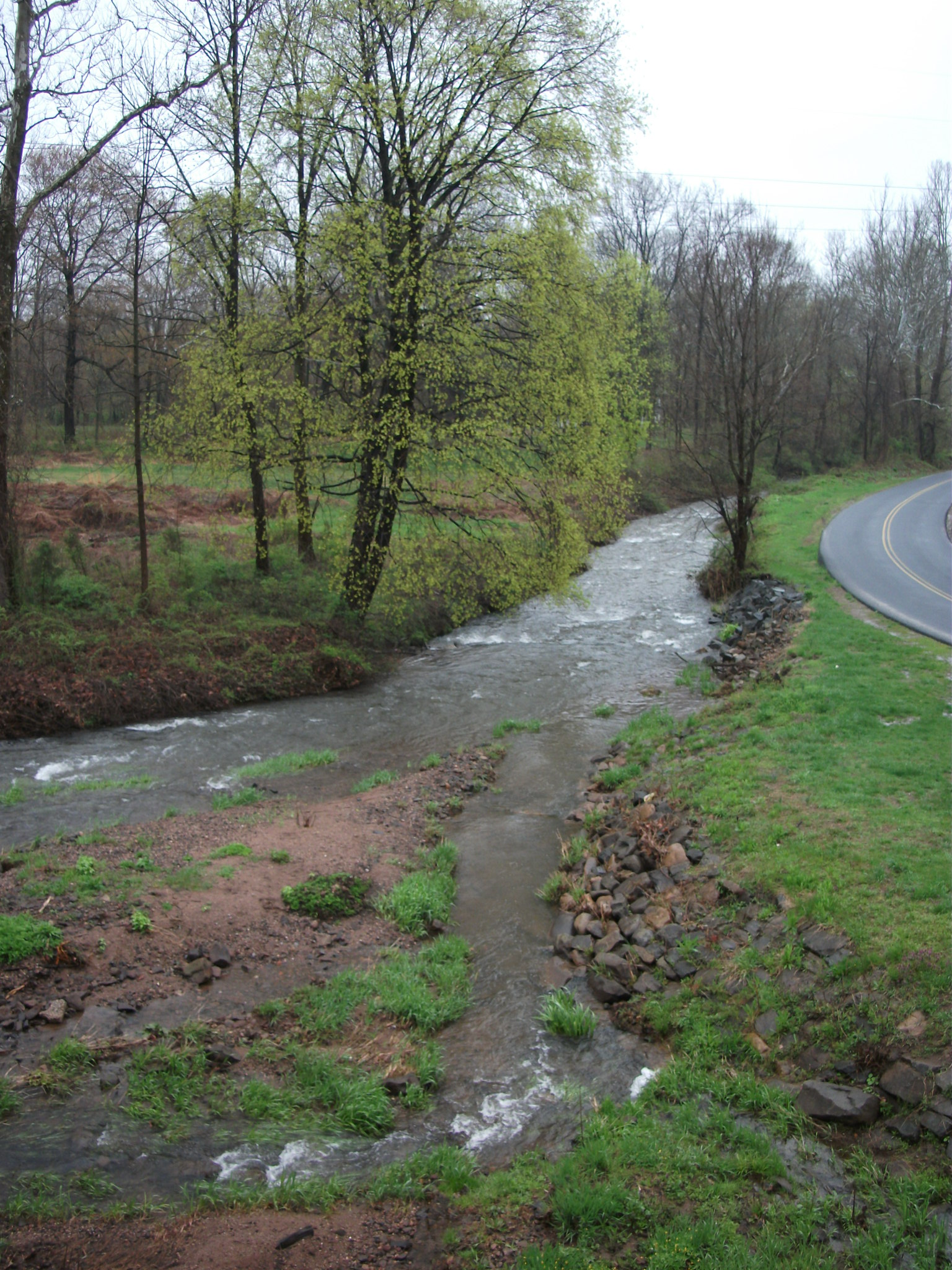
