= Geigertown, Pennsylvania =

Unincorporated community in Pennsylvania, US

- Unincorporated community
- Location within Pennsylvania
- Coordinates: 40°12′9″N 75°50′11″W
- Country: United States
- State: Pennsylvania
- County: Berks
- Township: Robeson, Union
- Elevation: 397 ft (121 m)
- Time zone: UTC-5 (Eastern (EST))
  - Summer (DST): UTC-4 (EDT)
- ZIP code: 19523
- Area codes: 610 and 484
- GNIS feature ID: 1175506

Geigertown is an unincorporated community in Berks County, Pennsylvania.

Geigertown is located within both Union Township and Robeson Township along Hay Creek Road (Former Pennsylvania Route 82) from Geigertown Road to Fire Tower Road. It is home to the Friendship Fire Company No. 1 of Geigertown and the Geigertown Central Railroad Museum off Geigertown Road.
