= Twin Valley School District =

School district in Pennsylvania, United States

Twin Valley School District (TVSD) is a school district headquartered in Caernarvon Township, Berks County, Pennsylvania, with an Elverson postal address. Within Berks County, the district includes Caernarvon Township (including the Berks County part of Morgantown), New Morgan, and Robeson Township (including Gibraltar). Within Chester County the district includes Elverson, Honey Brook, Honey Brook Township, and West Nantmeal Township.

== History ==
The school district was established in 1955.

The Twin Valley Junior-Senior High School, completed some time before 1960, had a cost of about $2.1 million. In 1960 there was a controversy over some Amish men who were jailed for not allowing their children to attend the junior-senior high school. The Twin Valley School District's board of trustees required that if the Amish men wished to give a religious education, they should not home school and instead incorporate a formal school of their own. The principal of the high school stated that it would not be feasible for the school district to operate a one room schoolhouse at the middle school for the Amish children.

Robert Pleis was superintendent from circa 2007 until 2020. Patrick Winters became the superintendent in 2021.

In 2022 the district had 3,000 students.

The district has a mascot featuring stereotypical Native American imagery. In 2022 the superintendent opposed a measure to change the mascot, as did the school board. On November 15, 2023 the ACLU Pennsylvania filed a federal lawsuit against the Twin Valley School District for refusing to give official status to the school's 'Retire the Raider Club' on behalf of Twin Valley Student Sloane Wolfe.

In 2024 Winters left his position of superintendent, and Robert Scoboria became the new superintendent. Scoboria was previously superintendent at Wyomissing School District.

== Schools ==
Secondary schools

- Twin Valley High School (Caernarvon Township, Elverson address)
- Twin Valley Middle School (Caernarvon Township, Elverson address)

Elementary schools

- Honey Brook Elementary Center (Honey Brook Township, Honey Brook address)
- Robeson Elementary Center (Robeson Township, Birdsboro address)
  - The school bus services transport 90 to 95% of the students. The Berks County government described the school's attendance boundary as "large".
- Twin Valley Elementary Center (Elverson)
  - Its attendance boundary includes areas east of Interstate 176 and southeast of Pennsylvania Route 82.

== Notable alumni ==
- A. J. Alexy, professional baseball player
- Ashley Hoffman (2015) and Kelee Lepage (2016) - members of the US National Field Hockey team at 2024 Summer Paris Olympics.
- Chad Hurley (1995) - co-founder and first CEO of YouTube.
- Kayla Collins (2005) model and Playboy Playmate (August 2008)
