= Interstate 176 =

Interstate Highway in Pennsylvania, US

Interstate 176
- Morgantown Expressway
- I-176 highlighted in red

Route information
- Auxiliary route of I-76
- Maintained by PennDOT
- Length: 11.345 mi (18.258 km)
- Existed: 1964–present
- NHS: Entire route

Major junctions
- South end: I-76 Toll / Penna Turnpike near Morgantown
- PA 10 near Morgantown; PA 724 in Cumru Township
- North end: US 422 near Reading

Location
- Country: United States
- State: Pennsylvania
- Counties: Berks

Highway system
- Interstate Highway System; Main; Auxiliary; Suffixed; Business; Future; Pennsylvania State Route System; Interstate; US; State; Scenic; Legislative
← PA 174	→ PA 176

Interstate 176 (I-176) is a spur route of eastern I-76 in Berks County, Pennsylvania. I-176, known as the Morgantown Expressway, travels from the Pennsylvania Turnpike (I-76) near Morgantown north to U.S. Route 422 (US 422) in Cumru Township in Berks County, a suburban township just outside the city of Reading. The entire length of the highway is just over 11 miles (18 km).

== Route description ==
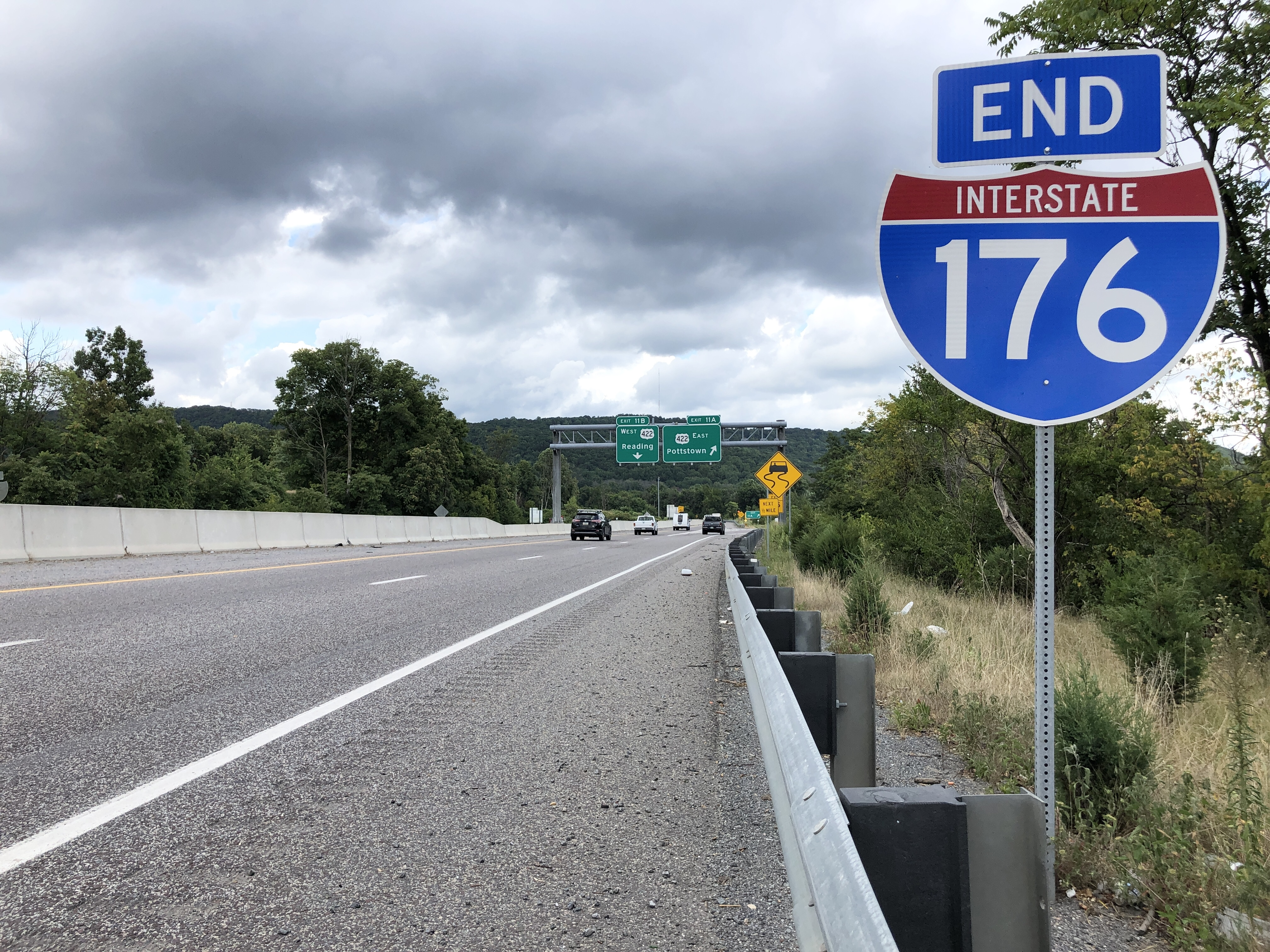
I-176 northern terminus at US 422 in Cumru Township

I-176 begins at the Morgantown Interchange with the Pennsylvania Turnpike (I-76) near the community of Morgantown in Caernarvon Township, Berks County. The highway heads north from a trumpet interchange with the turnpike as a four-lane freeway called the Morgantown Expressway. After passing through the former location of a toll plaza for traffic entering and exiting the turnpike, the freeway comes to an interchange with Pennsylvania Route 10 (PA 10) that provides access to Morgantown to the south. At this interchange, the freeway turns to the west, with a southbound runaway truck ramp just past the southbound exit ramp for PA 10. I-176 heads into the borough of New Morgan and runs through forested areas. The road comes to a southbound exit and northbound entrance with SR 2089, a four-lane freeway that heads south to an intersection with PA 10/PA 23 in Morgantown. This used to be I-176's old alignment before it was realigned between that point and its current terminus at the turnpike. At this point, the freeway curves to the northwest and forms the border between Caernarvon Township to the west and New Morgan to the east, passing through wooded surroundings as it heads to the west of a landfill. The route turns north and becomes the border between Robeson Township to the west and New Morgan to the east, before fully entering Robeson Township as it continues through forests. I-176 runs through wooded areas with some farm fields, passing over Allegheny Creek and PA 568 before it comes to a northbound exit and entrance with the parallel PA 10 to the east in Green Hills. From here, the freeway continues through woodland with nearby development and passes over PA 10 prior to entering Cumru Township and coming to a southbound exit and entrance connecting to PA 10 to the west. The road heads north-northeast through forested hills, curving to the north. The route reaches a diamond interchange with PA 724 and passes over Norfolk Southern Railway's Harrisburg Line #1 and the Schuylkill River Trail as it heads west of industrial areas. I-176 reaches its northern terminus at a trumpet interchange with the US 422 freeway southeast of the city of Reading.

== History ==
Interstate 180
- Location: Caernarvon Township–Cumru Township
- Existed: 1963–1964

Interstate 176 was originally conceived to provide an Interstate connection from the Pennsylvania Turnpike to Reading, largely due to the prevalence of the city's coal industry. Construction began on the highway in 1961, with the first section from exits 7 to 11 opening in 1962, and the remaining section opening in 1963.

At the time of its opening, the highway was originally known as Interstate 180 (I-180) or the "Reading Spur" when the Pennsylvania Turnpike was designated as I-80S, but was redesignated to its present-day number in 1964 when the turnpike was redesignated as I-76.

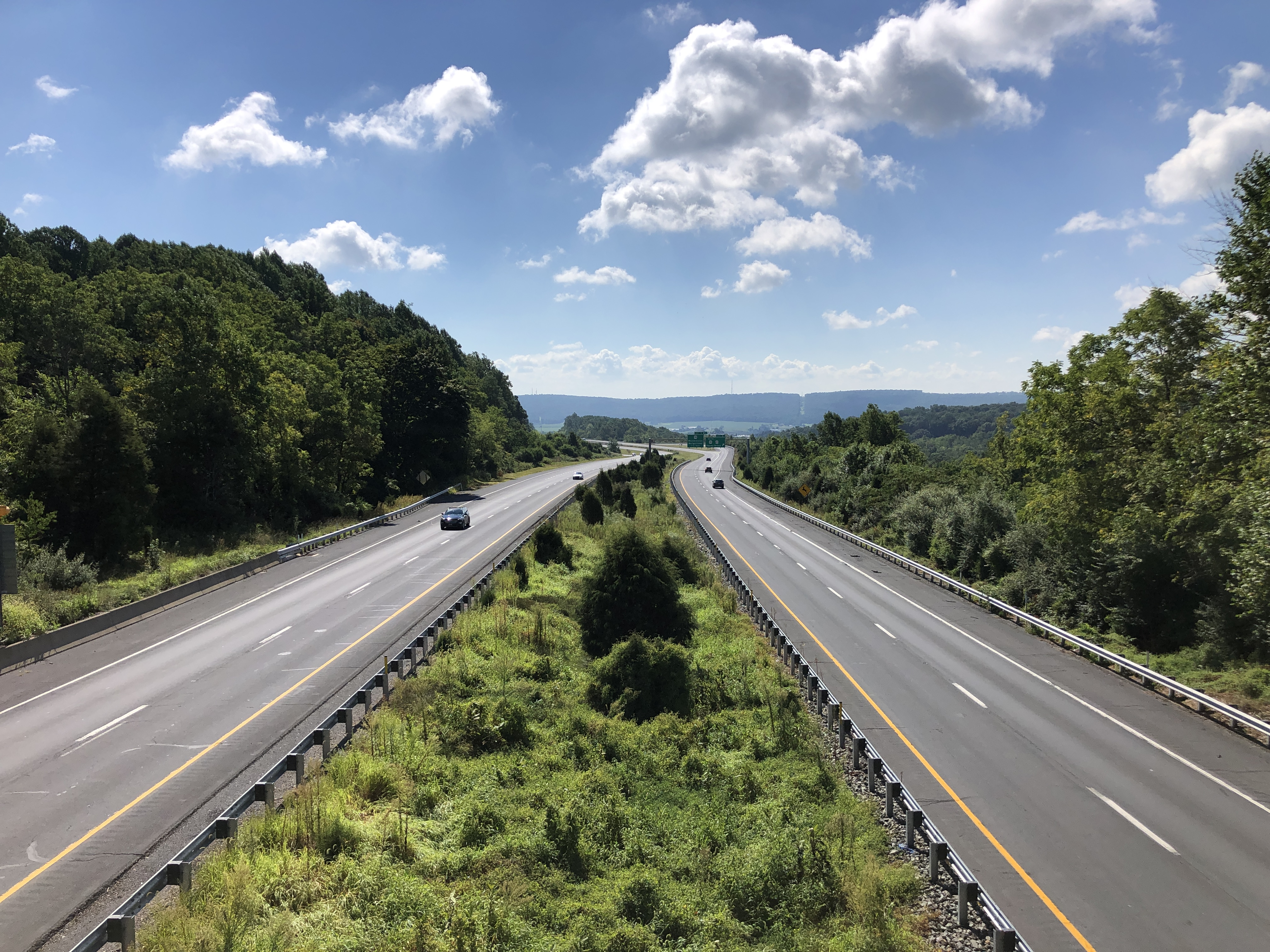
I-176 southbound in Caernarvon Township

Prior to 1996, I-176 did not have a direct connection to the Pennsylvania Turnpike. Motorists wanting to access I-176 had to travel through Morgantown on PA 10 and PA 23 before entering I-176 northbound to Reading at a traffic light, similar to that found where I-70 enters the turnpike in Breezewood. In September 1984, the Pennsylvania Turnpike Commission announced plans to replace the Morgantown Interchange to create a direct connection from the turnpike to I-176. Groundbreaking for the new interchange was held on February 28, 1989. The new interchange was built 1.5 miles (2.4 km) east of the old one, and merged onto the turnpike from the north, rather than the south. A partial cloverleaf interchange was built north of the new toll plaza to provide access to PA 10, which the old interchange provided direct access to. The new interchange opened on September 18, 1990, completing the first phase of the Morgantown connector. Construction on a new stretch of freeway to connect I-176 to the new Morgantown Interchange began in 1994, which opened on September 27, 1996. The original alignment of I-176 into Morgantown was kept intact, now as a spur numbered SR 2089 connecting exit 2 to PA 23.

The entire highway, except for the new direct connection, has a 65-mile-per-hour (105 km/h) speed limit.

In May 2018, I-176 was dedicated as the Vietnam War Veterans Memorial Highway, the Persian Gulf War Veterans Memorial Highway, and the Iraq and Afghanistan War Veterans Memorial Highway in honor of veterans from the Vietnam War, Persian Gulf War, Iraq War, and War in Afghanistan.

== Exit list ==
The entire route is in Berks County.

Location	mi	km	Old exit	New exit	Destinations	Notes
Caernarvon Township	0.000	0.000	–	–	I-76 Toll / Penna Turnpike – Philadelphia, Harrisburg	Southern terminus; exit 298 (Morgantown) on I-76 / Penna Turnpike
Caernarvon Township	0.201	0.323	1A	1	PA 10 to PA 23 – Beckersville, Morgantown (NB) PA 10 – Beckersville, Morgantown (SB)	Signed as exits 1A (east) and 1B (west) northbound; last southbound exit before toll
Caernarvon Township	1.275	2.052	1B	2	To PA 10 south / PA 23 – Honey Brook	Southbound exit and northbound entrance; access via SR 2089; access to Phoenixville and Lancaster
Robeson–Cumru township line	7.884	12.688	2	7	PA 10 to PA 568 – Green Hills	
Cumru Township	10.751	17.302	3	10	PA 724 – Shillington, Birdsboro	
Cumru Township	11.345	18.258	4	11	US 422 – Pottstown, Reading	Northern terminus; signed as exits 11A (east) and 11B (west)
1.000 mi = 1.609 km; 1.000 km = 0.621 mi: Electronic toll collection; Incomplete access

== See also ==
- List of auxiliary Interstate Highways
- List of Interstate Highways in Pennsylvania
