= Caernarvon Township, Berks County, Pennsylvania =

Township in Pennsylvania, US

- Township
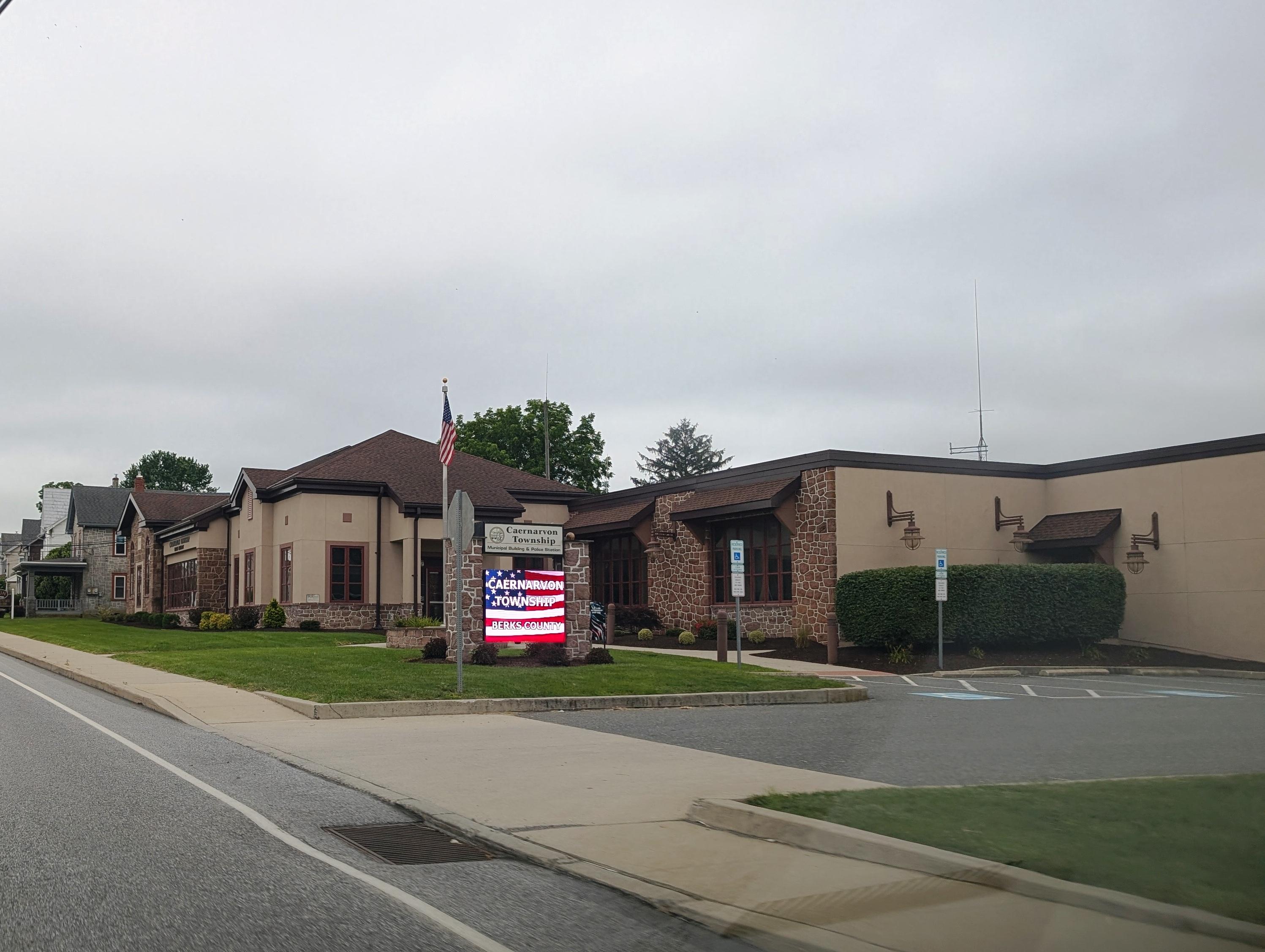
- Municipal offices and police department in Morgantown

- Seal Logo

- Location of Caernarvon Township in Pennsylvania Caernarvon Township (the United States)
- Coordinates: 40°10′02″N 75°52′42″W
- Country: United States
- State: Pennsylvania
- County: Berks
- Founded: 1752

Area
  - Total: 8.91 sq mi (23.08 km^{2})
  - Land: 8.87 sq mi (22.98 km^{2})
  - Water: 0.039 sq mi (0.10 km^{2})
- Elevation: 620 ft (190 m)

Population (2020)
  - Total: 4,252 ▲
  - Estimate (2021): 4,278
  - Density: 458.7/sq mi (177.12/km^{2})
- Time zone: UTC-5 (EST)
  - Summer (DST): UTC-4 (EDT)
- Area code: 610
- FIPS code: 42-011-10696
- Website: www.caernarvon.org

Caernarvon Township is a township in Berks County, Pennsylvania, United States. The population was 4,252 at the 2020 census. It is often referred to as Morgantown, the township's largest village.

== History ==
Caernarvon was so named by Welsh settlers after the town of Caernarfon in North Wales.

In 1718, William Davies and a band of Welsh settlers obtained land warrants stretching from the headwaters of the Conestoga River and reaching several miles downstream. When Lancaster County was established in 1729, this region was given the name Caernarvon Township in honor of its inhabitants.

When a portion of Lancaster County was transferred to the newly organized Berks County in 1752, the new boundary ran through existing Caernarvon Township as well as neighboring Brecknock Township.

Morgantown Historic District was listed on the National Register of Historic Places in 1995.

On May 28, 2019, an EF2 tornado hit Caernarvon Township, causing substantial damage to the area. Several residents and businesses were displaced as a result of the storm. It was the most powerful tornado to hit Berks County since the 1998 Lyons tornado.

== Geography ==
According to the U.S. Census Bureau, the township has a total area of 8.9 square miles (23 km^{2}), of which 8.9 square miles (23 km^{2}) is land and 0.11% is water. The township is partially located in the Hopewell Big Woods.

=== Adjacent townships ===
- Brecknock Township, Berks County (NW)
- Robeson Township, Berks County (N)
- West Nantmeal Township, Chester County (SE)
- Honey Brook Township, Chester County (S)
- Caernarvon Township, Lancaster County (SW)
- Brecknock Township, Lancaster County (W)

=== Adjacent boroughs ===
- New Morgan (N)
- Elverson (SE)

== Recreation ==
A portion of Pennsylvania State Game Lands, Number 43 and Number 52, are located in the township.

== Demographics ==
Historical population
Census	Pop.	Note	%±
1980	1,710		—
1990	1,933		13.0%
2000	2,312		19.6%
2010	4,006		73.3%
2020	4,252		6.1%
2021 (est.)	4,278		0.6%
Source: US Census Bureau

As of the 2000 census, there were 2,312 people, 888 households, and 658 families residing in the township. The population density was 260.3 inhabitants per square mile (100.5/km^{2}). There were 925 housing units at an average density of 104.1 per square mile (40.2/km^{2}). The racial makeup of the township was 97.79% White, 0.30% African American, 0.78% Asian, 0.22% from other races, and 0.91% from two or more races. Hispanic or Latino of any race were 0.87% of the population.

There were 888 households, out of which 32.4% had children under the age of 18 living with them, 64.1% were married couples living together, 6.6% had a female householder with no husband present, and 25.9% were non-families. 21.5% of all households were made up of individuals, and 8.4% had someone living alone who was 65 years of age or older. The average household size was 2.60 and the average family size was 3.05.

In the township, the population was spread out, with 26.1% under the age of 18, 6.5% from 18 to 24, 29.2% from 25 to 44, 24.1% from 45 to 64, and 14.2% who were 65 years of age or older. The median age was 38 years. For every 100 females, there were 98.1 males. For every 100 females age 18 and over, there were 95.1 males.

The median income for a household in the township was $49,041, and the median income for a family was $57,574. Males had a median income of $37,639 versus $27,273 for females. The per capita income for the township was $21,250. About 2.9% of families and 6.1% of the population were below the poverty line, including 12.1% of those under age 18 and none of those age 65 or over.

== Transportation ==
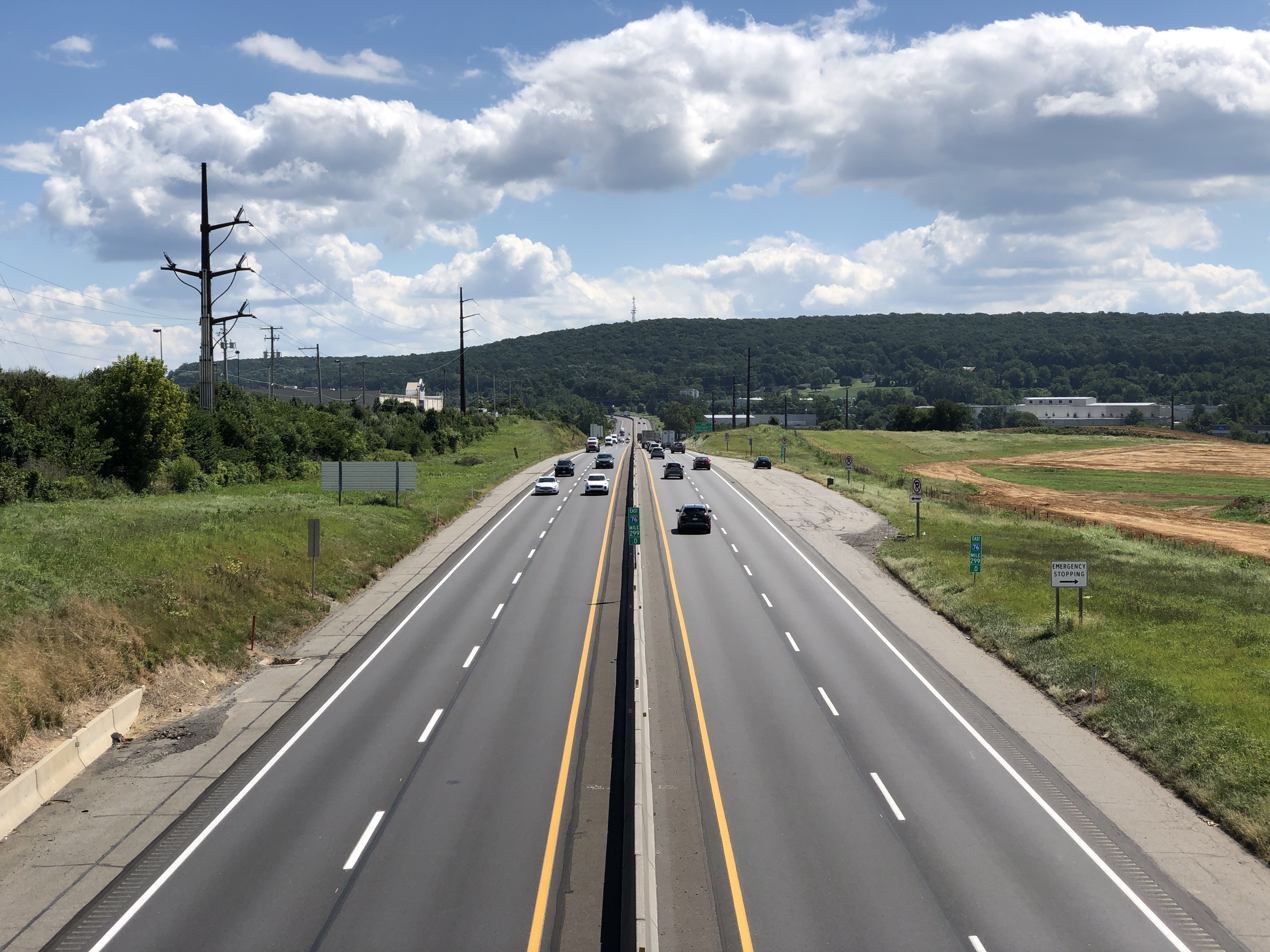
Pennsylvania Turnpike/I-76 eastbound in Caernarvon Township

As of 2018, there were 43.45 miles (69.93 km) of public roads in Caernarvon Township, of which 4.70 miles (7.56 km) were maintained by the Pennsylvania Turnpike Commission (PTC), 8.09 miles (13.02 km) were maintained by the Pennsylvania Department of Transportation (PennDOT) and 30.66 miles (49.34 km) were maintained by the township.

Caernarvon Township is a convergence point for several major highways. The most prominent of these is the Pennsylvania Turnpike (I-76), which follows a northwest–southeast alignment across the western and southern portions of the township. Interstate 176 follows the Morgantown Expressway northwestward across the central and northwestern portions of the township from its southern terminus at the Pennsylvania Turnpike. Pennsylvania Route 10 follows Main Street and Morgantown Road along a southwest–northeast alignment through the central portion of the township. Pennsylvania Route 23 follows Main Street along an east–west alignment across the southern portion of the township, sharing a brief concurrency with PA 10. Finally, Pennsylvania Route 401 heads southeast along Conestoga Road from its western terminus at PA 23 in the southeastern corner of the township.

== Education ==
The school district is Twin Valley School District.

The following are in the township (all of which have Elverson postal addresses): the district administration, the high school, and the middle school.
