= Elverson, Pennsylvania =

Borough in Pennsylvania, US

- Borough
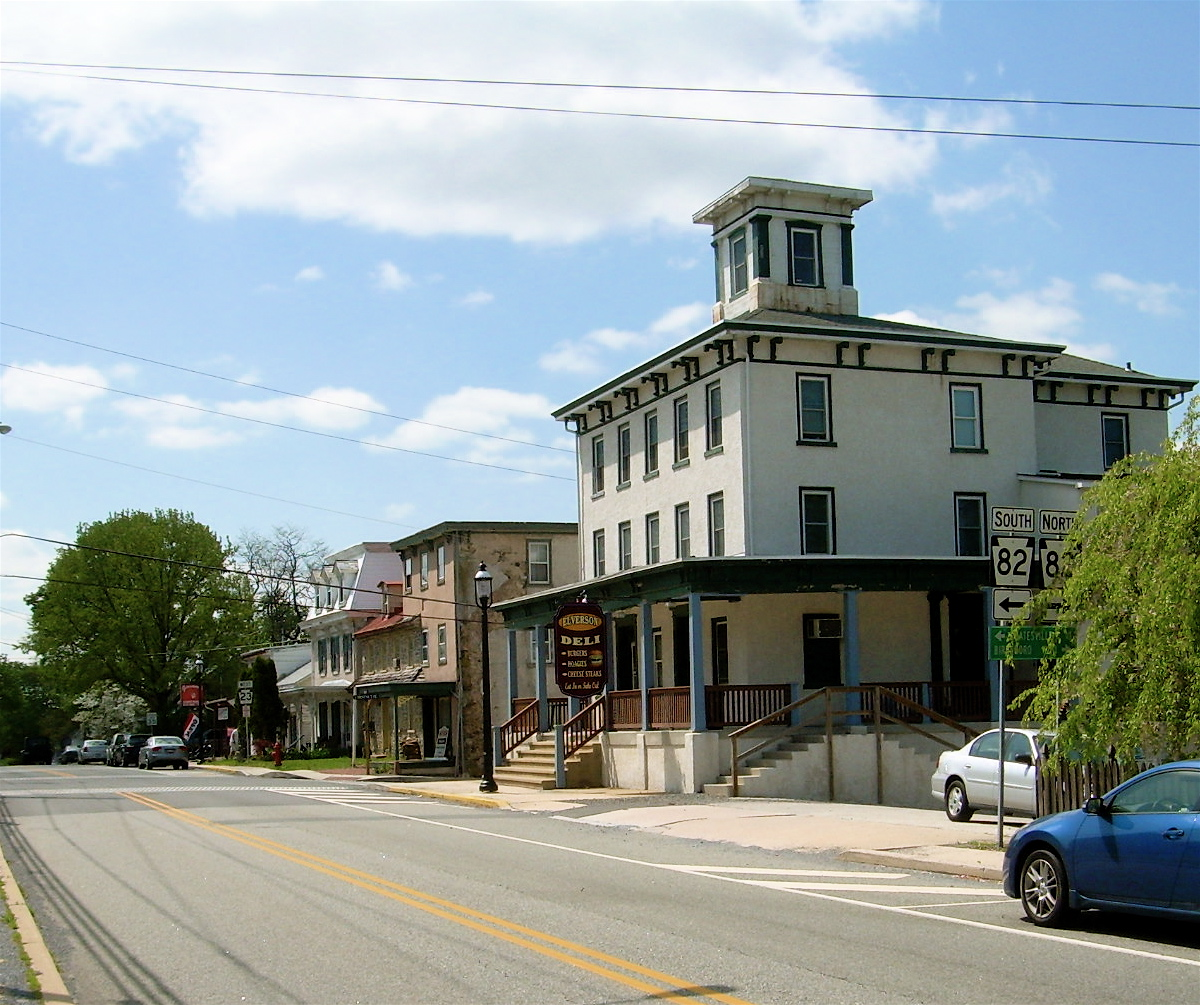
- Intersection of Main Street (Rt. 23) and Chestnut Street (Rt. 82)

- Location in Chester County and the U.S. state of Pennsylvania.

- Location in Pennsylvania Location in the United States
- Coordinates: 40°09′12″N 75°49′51″W
- Country: United States
- State: Pennsylvania
- County: Chester
- Incorporated: April 17, 1911
- Named after: James Elverson

Area
  - Total: 1.00 sq mi (2.60 km^{2})
  - Land: 1.00 sq mi (2.58 km^{2})
  - Water: 0.0077 sq mi (0.02 km^{2})
- Elevation: 669 ft (204 m)

Population (2020)
  - Total: 1,330
  - Density: 1,333.4/sq mi (514.83/km^{2})
- Time zone: UTC-5 (EST)
  - Summer (DST): UTC-4 (EDT)
- ZIP Code: 19520
- Area codes: 610 and 484
- FIPS code: 42-23440
- Website: www.elversonboro.org

Elverson is a borough in Chester County, Pennsylvania, United States. The population was 1,332 at the 2020 census.

Settled near the region's early iron mines, Elverson is close to Hopewell Furnace National Historic Site, an example of a 19th-century "iron plantation".

== History ==
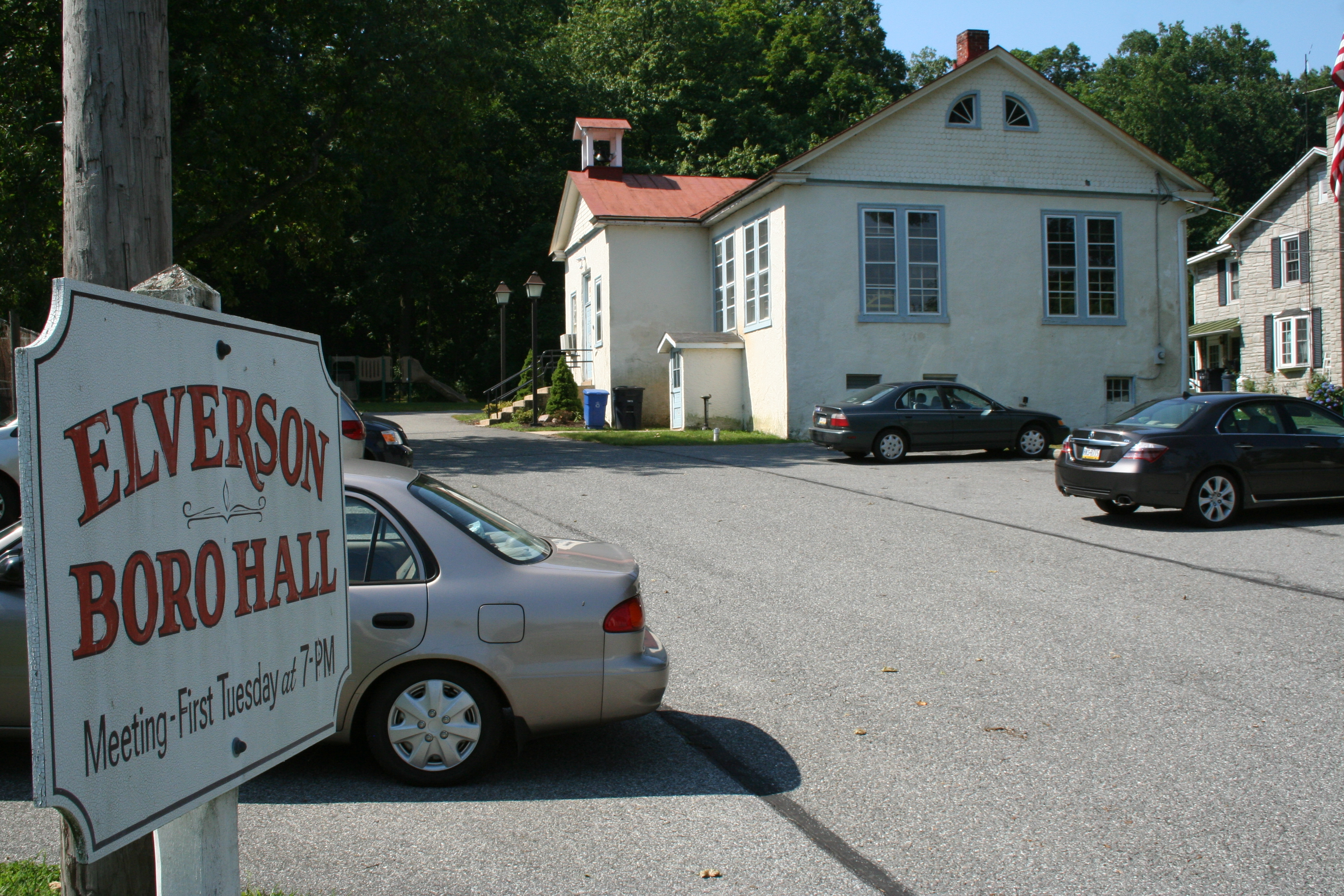
Elverson Borough Hall

Elverson's earliest European settlers arrived in the late 18th century when the area was known as Springfield. Later dubbed Blue Rock after a deposit of peculiar rocks not far from the town, it remained largely rural until the arrival of the Wilmington and Northern Railroad in 1870. By 1883, the town's population had more than doubled.

In 1899, the settlement was named Elverson after James Elverson, owner of The Philadelphia Inquirer, who later donated a stained glass window to a church in Elverson. The Borough of Elverson was officially incorporated on April 17, 1911, from land annexed from West Nantmeal Township, and it remained the commercial center of northwestern Chester County through the first half of the 20th century.

In 1953, the borough annexed additional land, resulting in its current size of about one square mile.

Elverson's building styles follow the periods of its commercial growth and range from early 19th century stone or log buildings to post-railroad Queen Anne structures and 20th century craftsman and Foursquare-style houses. Commercial and residential development since the 1950s has occurred largely on the outskirts of the borough's historic center. The Wilmington and Northern Railroad line, later incorporated into the Reading Railroad system, was abandoned and removed in 1983.

The Elverson Historic District was listed on the National Register of Historic Places in 1993.

== Demographics ==
Historical population
Census	Pop.	Note	%±
1920	304		—
1930	330		8.6%
1940	316		−4.2%
1950	370		17.1%
1960	472		27.6%
1970	509		7.8%
1980	530		4.1%
1990	470		−11.3%
2000	959		104.0%
2010	1,225		27.7%
2020	1,330		8.6%
2021 (est.)	1,387	▲	4.3%

At the 2010 census, the borough was 96.7% non-Hispanic White, 0.6% Black or African American, 0.1% Native American, 0.5% Asian, and 0.7% were two or more races. 1.6% of the population were of Hispanic or Latino ancestry .

At the 2000 census there were 959 people, 412 households, and 313 families residing in the borough. The population density was 961.2 inhabitants per square mile (371.1/km^{2}). There were 460 housing units at an average density of 461.1 per square mile (178.0/km^{2}). The racial makeup of the borough was 97.08% White, 0.31% African American, 1.36% Asian, 0.42% from other races, and 0.83% from two or more races. Hispanic or Latino of any race were 0.63%.

There were 412 households, 21.4% had children under the age of 18 living with them, 68.2% were married couples living together, 5.6% had a female householder with no husband present, and 23.8% were non-families. 20.9% of households were made up of individuals, and 5.8% were one person aged 65 or older. The average household size was 2.33 and the average family size was 2.68.

In the borough the population was spread out, with 17.7% under the age of 18, 4.1% from 18 to 24, 22.2% from 25 to 44, 32.1% from 45 to 64, and 23.9% 65 or older. The median age was 50 years. For every 100 females there were 86.6 males. For every 100 females age 18 and over, there were 90.1 males.

The median household income was $57,813 and the median family income was $62,273. Males had a median income of $40,000 versus $31,953 for females. The per capita income for the borough was $27,162. About 0.6% of families and 1.8% of the population were below the poverty line, including none of those under age 18 and 3.9% of those age 65 or over.

== Geography ==
According to the United States Census Bureau, the borough has a total area of 1.0 square mile (2.6 km^{2}), all land. Elverson borders the Hopewell Big Woods. The city of Reading is approximately 18 miles (29 km) north of the borough.

=== Adjacent municipalities ===
- Caernarvon Township, Berks County - north
- West Nantmeal Township, Chester County - east, south, and west

== Transportation ==
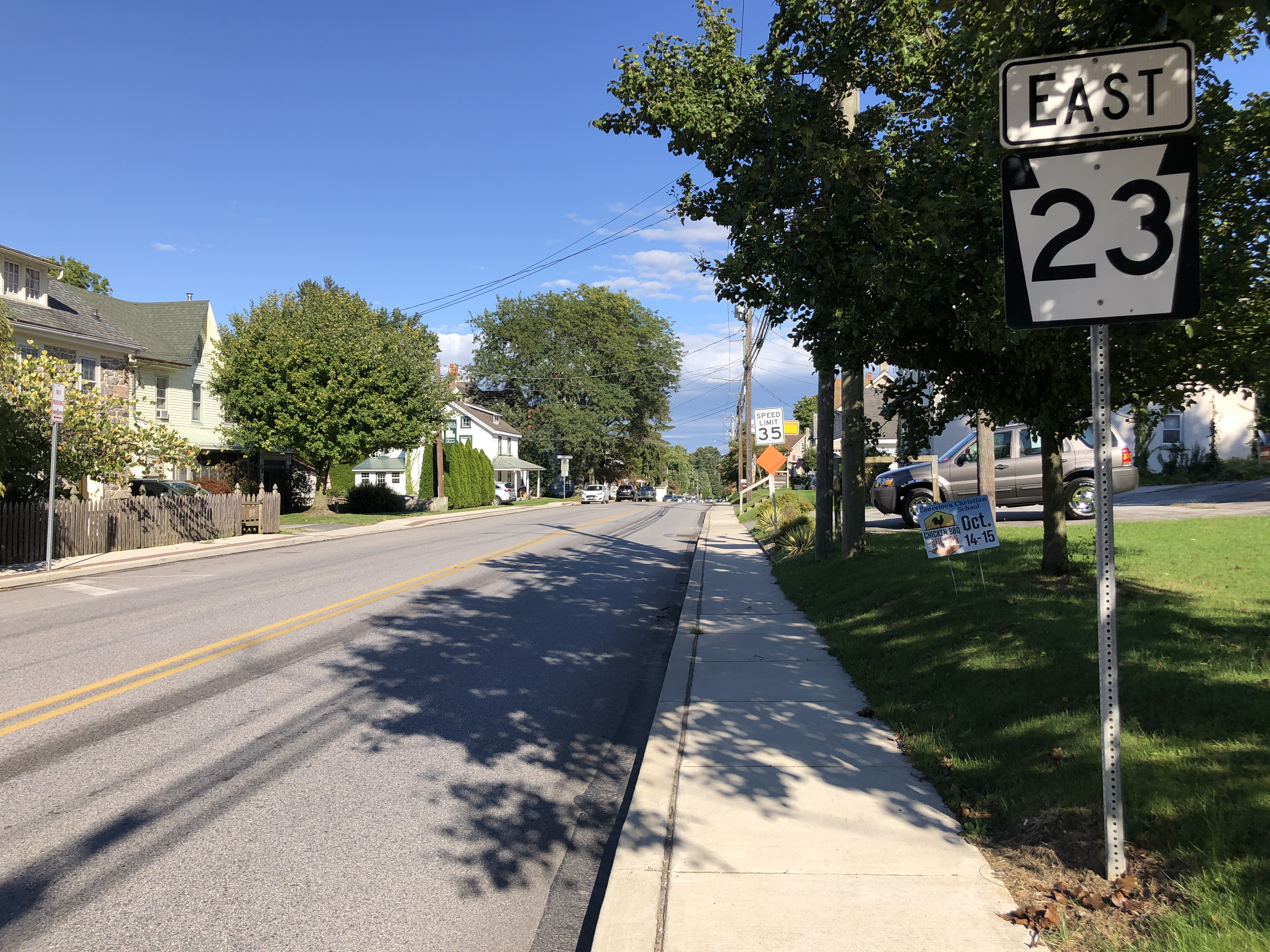
PA 23 eastbound in Elverson

As of 2009, there were 5.82 miles (9.37 km) of public roads in Elverson, of which 3.26 miles (5.25 km) were maintained by Pennsylvania Department of Transportation (PennDOT) and 2.56 miles (4.12 km) were maintained by the borough.

Three numbered highways serve Elverson. Pennsylvania Route 23 follows an east–west alignment through the heart of the borough along Main Street. Pennsylvania Route 82 starts at PA 23 and heads southward along Chestnut Street. Finally, Pennsylvania Route 401 follows Conestoga Road along an east–west alignment across the southern edge of the borough.

== Education ==
The school district is Twin Valley School District. Twin Valley Elementary Center is in Elverson. Twin Valley Middle School and Twin Valley High School are in Caernarvon Township, Berks County, and have Elverson postal addresses.

== Notable person ==
- Stone Librande; a game designer, was born in Elverson.
