= Marie Kachel Bucher =

American teacher (1909–2008)

Marie Elizabeth Kachel Bucher
- Born: Marie Elizabeth Kachel; November 21, 1909
- Died: July 27, 2008 (aged 98); Quarryville, Pennsylvania
- Occupation: Teacher
- Known for: Last surviving resident member of the German Seventh Day Baptists of the Ephrata Cloister
- Spouse: Loren H. Bucher
- Children: Loren K. Bucher, Christina Bucher
- Parent(s): Reuben S. Kachel, M. Kathryn Zerfass Kachel

Marie Elizabeth Kachel Bucher (November 21, 1909 – July 27, 2008) was an American schoolteacher and the last surviving resident member of the German Seventh-Day Baptists religious congregation of the Ephrata Cloister, a United States National Historic Landmark located in Ephrata, Pennsylvania.

== Biography ==
Marie Elizabeth Kachel was born in 1909. Her parents were Reuben S. Kachel and M. Kathryn Zerfass Kachel. She had four sisters and one brother. She was raised on Shady Nook Farm during her early life, which was located in what is now known as the Ephrata Cloister. Her family, who were one of its last residents, often gave tours of the Ephrata Cloister, which was founded by Johann Conrad Beissel in 1732. The Ephrata Cloister was later purchased by the Commonwealth of Pennsylvania. Today the Ephrata Cloister is administered by the Pennsylvania Historical and Museum Commission as a museum and tourist attraction.

Kachel graduated from Ephrata High School in 1927. She earned her Bachelor of Science degree from Millersville State Teachers College, which is now known as Millersville University, in 1935. She later earned her master's degree in education from Penn State University in 1939. Additionally, Kachel also studied at Duke University and Elizabethtown College.

Kachel began her teaching career at a one-room schoolhouse in Clay Township, Pennsylvania, in northern Lancaster County. She later moved to southern Lancaster County to take a position in the now-defunct East Drumore Township school district. She retired from teaching after working as a math teacher at Solanco High School, a public high school for many years.

Kachel married her husband, Loren H. Bucher, an East Drumore Township farmer, in 1945. They had two children, Loren K. Bucher and Christina Bucher. Kachel Bucher never formally joined the Church of the Brethren, but taught adult Bible study and remained active in the Church's congregation in Mechanics Grove, Pennsylvania. In her later years, Bucher wrote and researched a book on the history of the Church of the Brethren's Mechanics Grove congregation titled A Century of Service at the Grove. Bucher was 87 when the book was written and published in 1997.

Marie Elizabeth Kachel Bucher died at the Quarryville Presbyterian Home in Quarryville, Pennsylvania, on July 27, 2008, at 98. She had resided at the nursing home since November 2007. Her death marked the passing of the last surviving resident of the Ephrata Cloister. Her funeral was held at the Saal at the Ephrata Cloister on July 31, 2008, and she was buried at Mt. Zion Cemetery.

Bucher was survived by her children, Loren and Christina. She had been preceded in death by her husband and her siblings; four sisters—Kitty Kachel Strickler, Dorothy Kachel Grabill, Margaret P. Kachel, and Ruth Kachel Donough—and her brother, Daniel S. Kachel.
