= Kachel =

Kachel is a German surname meaning "tile". Notable people with the surname include:

- Chris Kachel (born 1955), Australian former professional tennis player
- Józef Kachel (1913–1983), Polish Boy Scouts scoutmaster and politician
- Marie Kachel Bucher (1909–2008), American schoolteacher and last surviving resident member of the German Seventh-Day Baptists religious community of the Ephrata Cloister
