= Ephrata National Bank =

Bank in Ephrata, Pennsylvania

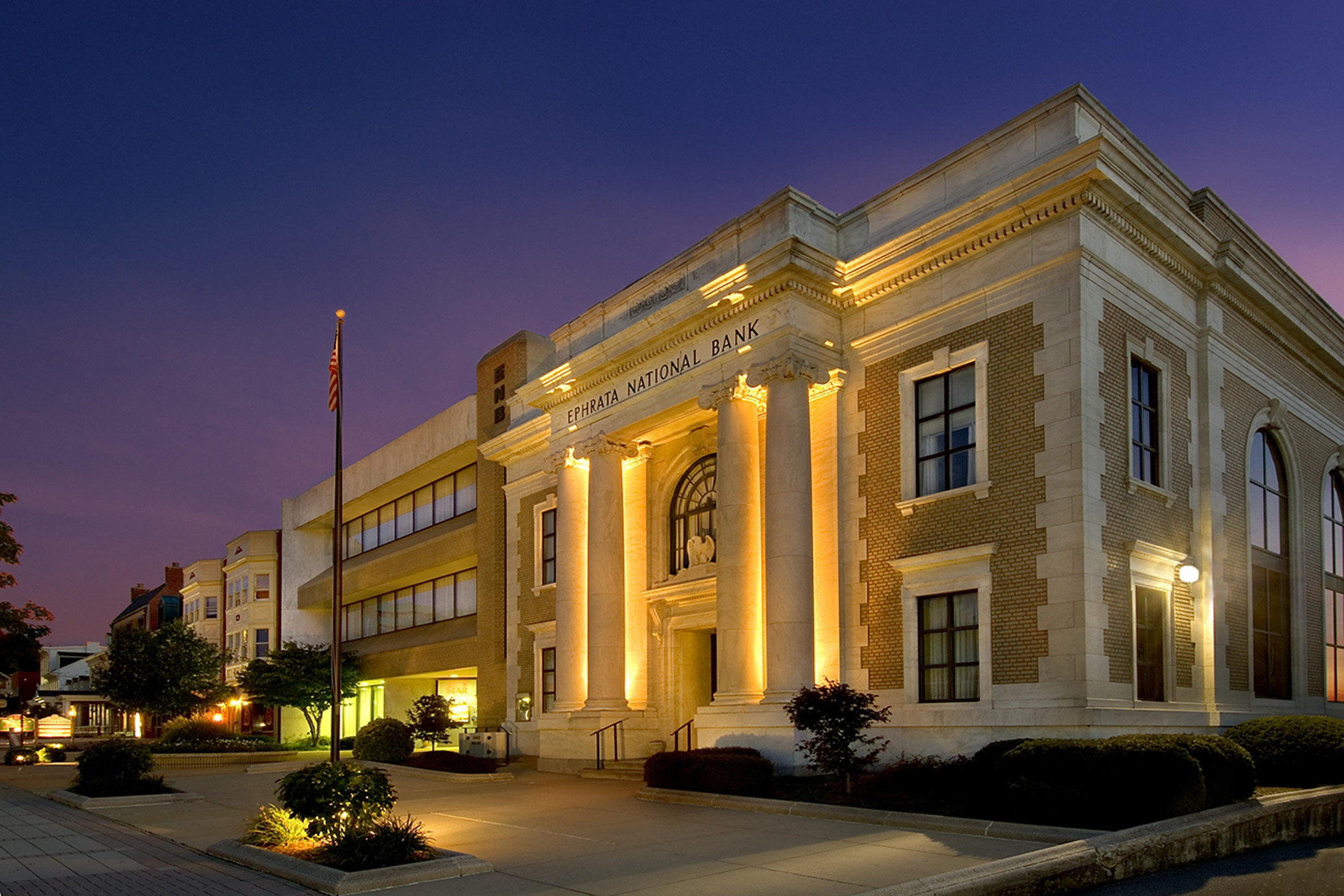
- Type: Subsidiary
- Traded as: OTCQX: ENBP
- Industry: Financial services
- Founded: July 1, 2008; 18 years ago (as ENB Financial Corp); Ephrata National Bank founded in 1881
- Headquarters: 31 E. Main Street, Ephrata, Pennsylvania, United States
- Key people: Jeffrey S. Stauffer, Chairman, President & CEO; Rachel G. Bitner, CFO, Treasurer & Executive Vice President; Joselyn D. Strohm, Chief Operating Officer & Senior Executive VP
- Products: Business banking; Business loans; Cash management; Checking accounts; Home loans; Insurance; Investment services; Merchant services; Savings accounts
- Total assets: $2.22 billion (as of 2024)
- Number of employees: 306 (2024)
- Parent: ENB Financial Corp.
- Website: epnb.com

Ephrata National Bank (ENB) is an American FDIC-insured community bank headquartered in Ephrata, Pennsylvania, United States. Established in 1881, ENB has locations in Lancaster, Lebanon, and Berks counties. In 2025, the bank announced an agreement to acquire Elkton, Maryland-based Cecil Bank.

== History ==
Ephrata National Bank opened in 1881, founded with the backing of 73 investors contributing $100 each. The bank's largest investor at the time, local entrepreneur William Z. Sener, served as the bank's first president.

Ephrata National Bank is headquartered in a historic building on Main Street in Ephrata, which was designed for the bank by Lancaster architect C. Emlen Urban and completed in 1925. The building's Beaux-Arts structure is noted for its marble detailing, walnut interior trim, and 26-ton vault door.

On its centennial anniversary in 1981, Ephrata National Bank added an annex connecting its original 1925 bank building with an addition that had been completed in 1960. A 2011 restoration focused on keeping the building up to date while reviving the "feel" of its original style.

As branch banking grew in the latter half of the 20th century, Ephrata National Bank expanded to other Lancaster County communities including Hinkletown, Denver, Akron, and Blue Ball.

In June 2025, the bank opened a location in downtown Lititz, located in the restored 1924 Lititz Springs National Bank building. The bank building, featuring neoclassical architecture with Ionic columns, was also designed by C. Emlen Urban, the architect of ENB's main office.

Also in 2025, the company announced an agreement to acquire Cecil Bancorp, Inc. of Elkton, Maryland, which operated four branches in Cecil County. The deal, worth around $31 million, marked ENB's first bank acquisition.

== Operations ==
ENB's customer base includes members of the local Amish and Mennonite communities, and some branches include accommodations such as horse ties and access to water for customers who travel by horse and buggy.

In 2025, ENB announced that president and CEO Jeffrey Stauffer would retire. The bank's chief financial officer, Rachel Bitner, was named his successor, becoming the first woman to hold this role.

== Presidents ==
Ephrata National Bank's presidents, along with the years they served in this role, are listed below.

- William Z. Sener, 1881–1893
- John Yundt Weidman, 1894–1896
- Martin Landis Weidman, 1896–1929
- J. Harry Hibshman, 1930–1964
- S. Harold Hacker, 1964–1978
- John Shuey, 1978–1999
- Aaron L. Groff Jr., 1999–2019
- Jeffrey S. Stauffer, 2020–present

=== J. Harry Hibshman Scholarship Fund ===
J. Harry Hibshman, the fourth president of Ephrata National Bank, established a scholarship fund in his will for graduating seniors of Ephrata High School, funded by the yearly dividend payments from his stock holdings.

Hibshman, who joined ENB at age 17 as a teller, was a long-time Ephrata resident whose career at the bank spanned 75 years.

The J. Harry Hibshman Scholarship Fund had total assets of approximately $4.94 million in 2024, with Ephrata National Bank serving as trustee. Since 1965, the nonprofit has awarded over $32 million to 4,600 students as of 2024.

== Recognitions ==
In 2024, ENB was named Large Business of the Year by the Northern Lancaster County Chamber of Commerce, marking the first time it received this award.

In 2025, Ephrata National Bank was included in American Banker's performance-based ranking of banks with assets between $2 billion and $10 billion, appearing within the top 200 institutions in this category.

== See also ==
- Ephrata, Pennsylvania
- Ephrata Commercial Historic District
- Lancaster County, Pennsylvania
