= Michael Wohlfahrt =

American religious leader

- Born: 1687; Memel, Duchy of Prussia
- Died: 1741 (aged 53–54)
- Other names: Michael Welfare, Brother Agonius
- Occupation: Religious leader
- Known for: Leading the Ephrata Community with Conrad Beissel in Pennsylvania

Michael Wohlfahrt (German pronunciation: [ˈmɪçaʔeːl ˈvoːlfaːɐ̯t]; 1687–1741), also known as Michael Welfare, and Brother Agonius, was a Prussian-American christian religious leader who assisted Conrad Beissel in leading the Ephrata Community in Pennsylvania.

== Biography ==
Wohlfahrt was born in Memel in the Duchy of Prussia (now Klaipėda in Lithuania), but emigrated to North America.

In 1725, he was baptised by Conrad Beissel, and when the Conestoga Brethren congregation suffered a schism, he strongly supported Beissel. After the foundation of the Ephrata Community in 1732, Wohlfahrt took the name "Brother Agonius" and assisted Beissel in running the community.

Welfare was an acquaintance of Benjamin Franklin who, in his autobiography, recounted that "the Dunkers" had been "calumniated by the zealots of other persuasions". Franklin suggested publishing articles about their beliefs, to which Welfare had responded:

When we were first drawn together as a society, it had pleased God to enlighten our minds so far as to see that some doctrines, which we once esteemed truths, were errors; and that others, which we had esteemed errors, were real truths. From time to time He has been pleased to afford us farther light, and our principles have been improving, and our errors diminishing. Now we are not sure that we are arrived at the end of this progression, and at the perfection of spiritual or theological knowledge; and we fear that, if we should once print our confession of faith, we should feel ourselves as if bound and confin'd by it, and perhaps be unwilling to receive further improvement, and our successors still more so, as conceiving what we their elders and founders had done, to be something sacred, never to be departed from.

Franklin commented on this:

This modesty in a sect is perhaps a singular instance in the history of mankind, every other sect supposing itself in possession of all truth, and that those who differ are so far in the wrong.

In 1985 Neil Postman drew another parallel by referring to a quote by Plato:

No man of intelligence will venture to express his philosophical views in language, especially not in language that is unchangeable, which is true of that which is set down in written characters.
