= Ephrata Fair =

Coordinates: 40.12525°N 76.21416°W

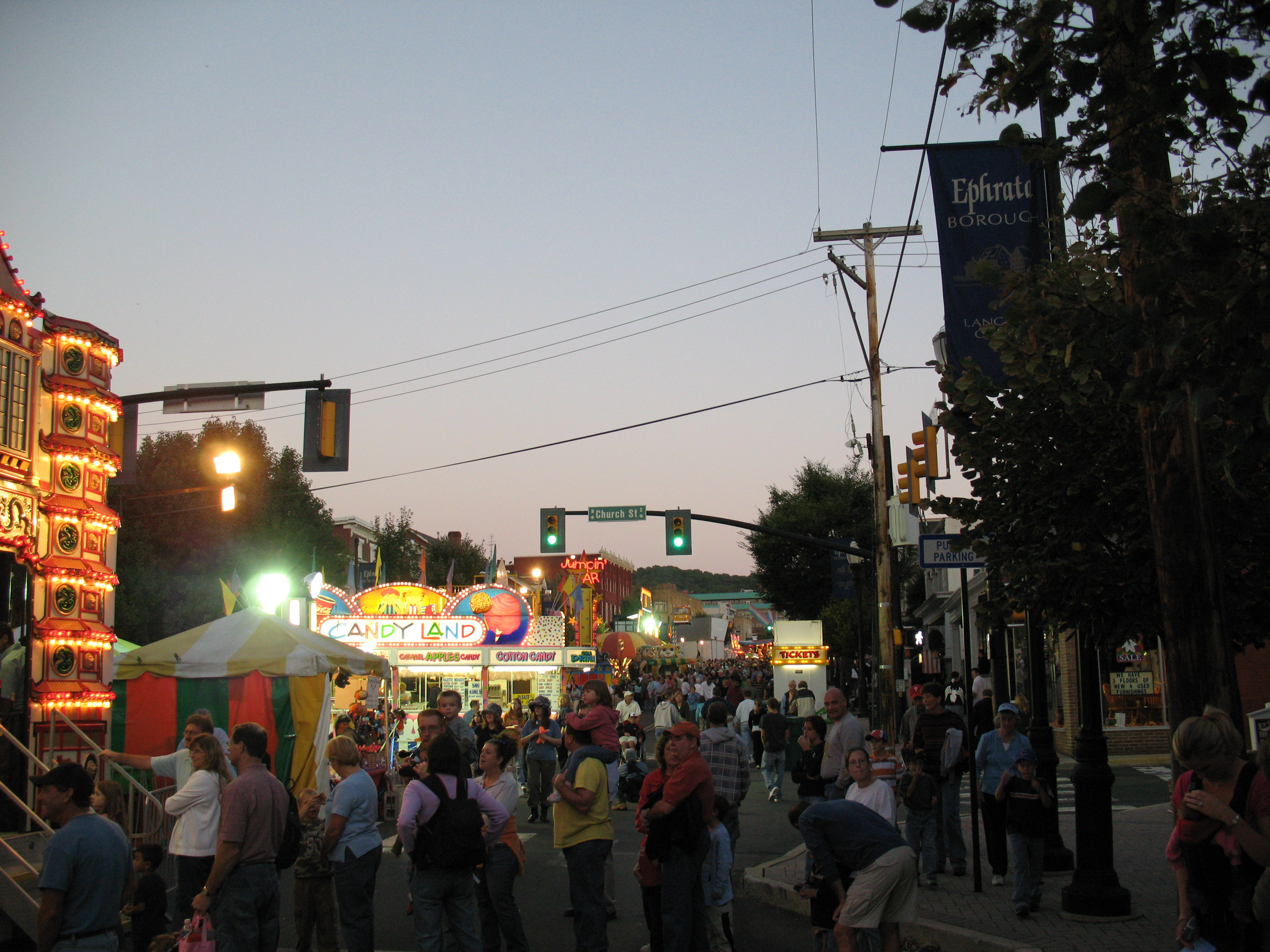
The 2007 Fair along Main Street, at Church Street

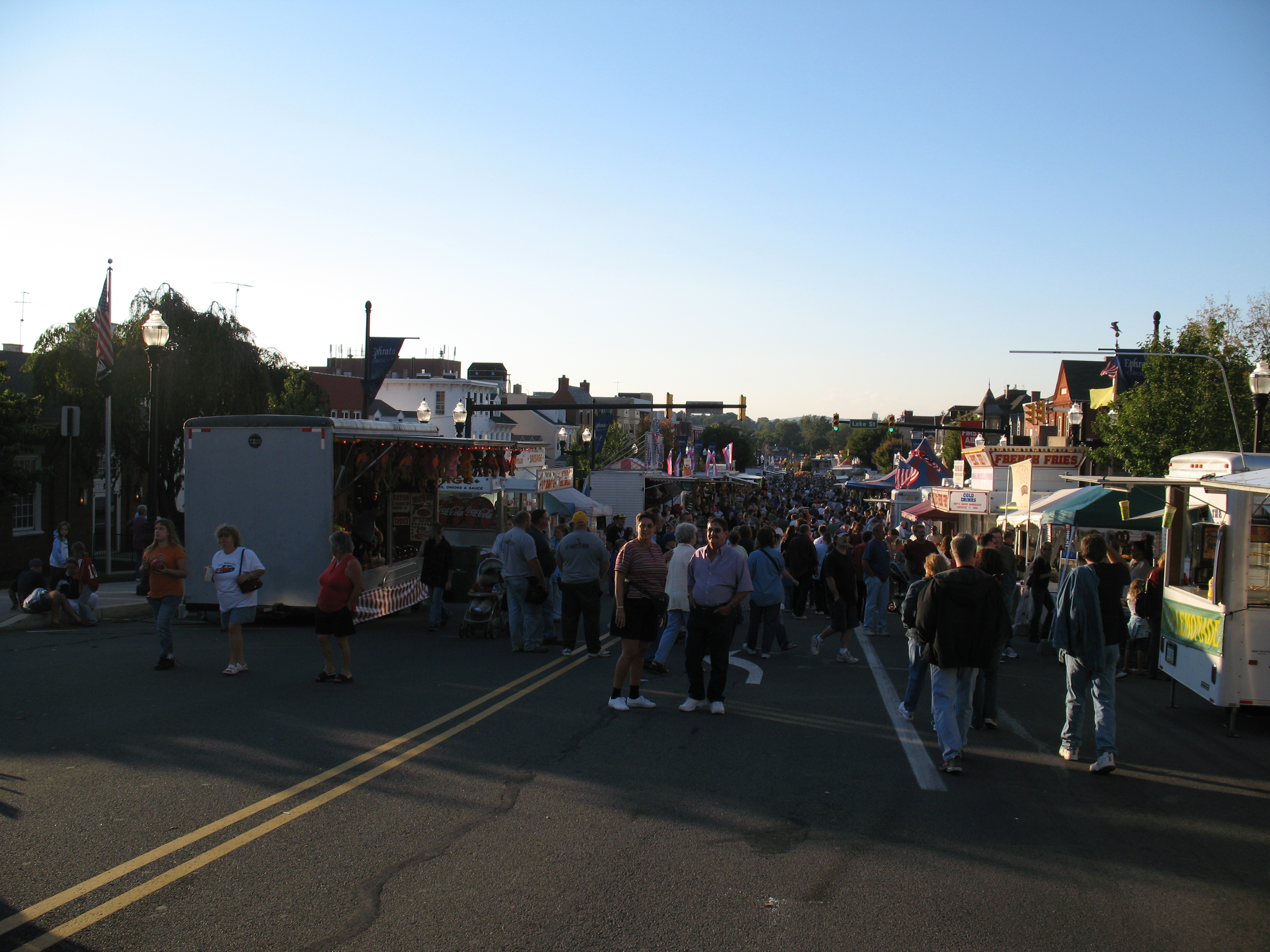
The 2007 Fair along Main Street, at Lake Street

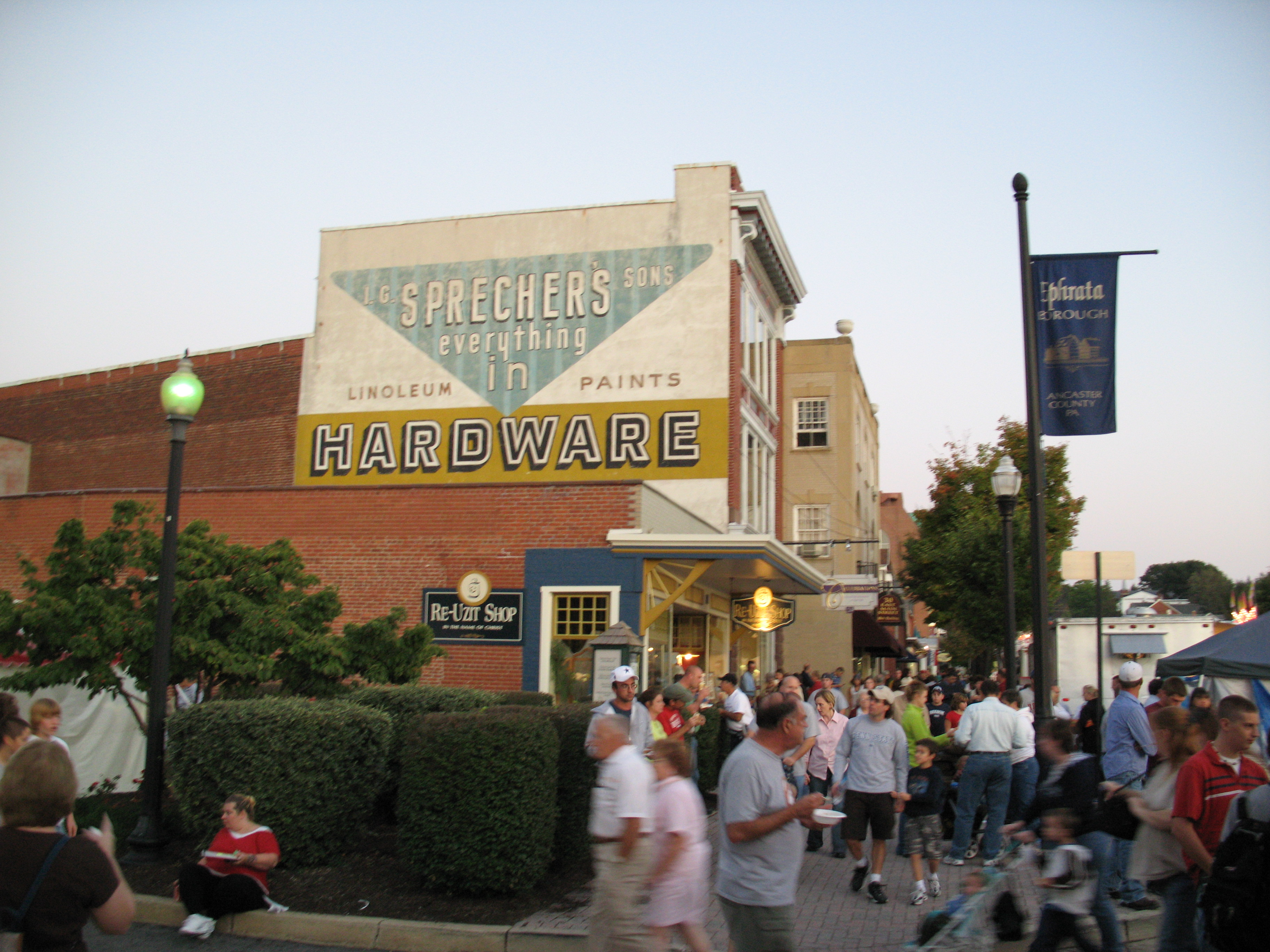
An advertisement for I.G. Sprecher's former hardware store, located along Main Street

The Ephrata Fair is held each year in Ephrata, Lancaster County, and is the largest street fair in Pennsylvania.

== History ==
In the late 1910s, such businessmen in Ephrata as Harry Singer, Dutch Butcher, Charles Yeager, and I.G. Sprecher decided to hold a celebration for the areas rich agriculture. The aforementioned group of men, along with other businessmen, created and funded the first Ephrata Fair. In 1922, what is now known as the Ephrata Fair was officially called the Ephrata Farmer’s Day Fair. In the 1920s, the celebration was extended to three days and welcomed the addition of a Mummers Parade.

The Ephrata Farmer’s Day Fair was held in October from the year of its conception to the 1940s. After that time, the event was scheduled to be held in September due to the inclement weather of October. In the 1930s, the Ephrata Cloister Post #429, American Legion would distribute a free automobile through the use of a raffle. The winner would be drawn between 12:00 and 12:30 AM. This event did not survive World War II since cars became much more scarce during that time.

There were many changes to the Ephrata Fair after World War II. With the contribution of a baby parade, more entertainment rides, and a beauty pageant, the Fair began to take on a larger form. The parade was moved to Wednesday evenings, which is still the tradition today. Around 1966, Tent City was added to the Ephrata Fair. One of individuals responsible for the addition of this agricultural attraction was a vo-ag teacher at Ephrata named Charles Ackley. Tent City took shape every year in the Ephrata Park on the baseball diamond beside the Cocalico Creek. Two of the main attractions of Tent City were the pig chase and a chicken chase for the kids. This was ended after multiple protesters that claimed this was animal abuse. One can also view a sheep show, a hog show, a dairy and beef show. and an annual tractor pull.

The Ephrata Fair also has some claim to history with national significance. In 1953, Evelyn Ay won the Miss Lancaster County Pageant that was held every Saturday night during fair week. Evelyn Ay then won the Miss America title in Atlantic City. For her talent, Miss Ay read Henry Wadsworth Longfellow’s poem, “The Song of Hiawatha.”

The fair has been held nearly every year, except for cancellations from 1942–45 due to World War II as well as in 2020 due to the COVID-19 pandemic.

== Prior Festivals ==
Before the Ephrata Fair that is widely known today, there were many other festivals held in the little town of Ephrata, Pennsylvania. In the 1880s, the Ephrata Baseball Club would hold fairs on what was then known as Baker’s Lot. Between the 1880s and early 1900s, the Mountain Springs Rifles would hold celebrations on the Mountain Springs Hotel. In the 1880s and 1890s, the Ephrata Cornet Band would hold festivities in Reddig’s Hall and the Ephrata Band Hall. From 1891 to 1926, the Pioneer Fire Company held fairs in the Band Hall. The month of the annual celebration varied between January and February. It is worth noting that Ephrata’s first street fair was prior to World War I. The Ephrata Park Association held several of these festivals on Main Street prior to 1914. The organization bought land from Samuel Heinicke with the intention of converting the property into a community park. In fact, the present day location of this land is the Ephrata Community Park. The location of this street fair was the section of Main Street between State Street and Lake Street.
