= Ethel Post-Parrish =

American Spiritualist medium (died 1960)

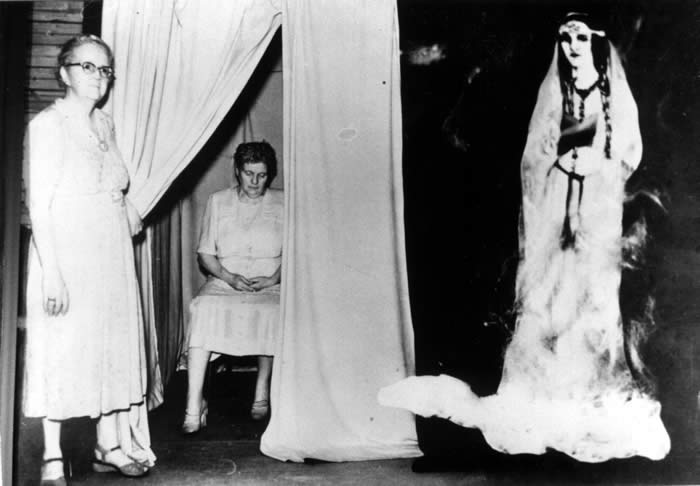
The spirit guide Silver Belle was made from cardboard. Both Parrish and the lady standing outside the curtain were in on the hoax.

Ethel Post-Parrish (died 1960) was an American Spiritualist medium.

== Biography ==
In 1932 Parrish founded Camp Silver Belle, a Spiritualist summer camp at Mountain Springs Hotel in Ephrata, Pennsylvania. In her séances Parrish claimed to materialize her spirit guide, an Indian girl known as Silver Belle.

In a séance at Ephrata, Pennsylvania, in 1953, Parrish materialized Silver Belle whilst sitting in a curtained cabinet. The pictures, claimed to be taken at 50 second intervals in infra-red light by photographer Jack Edwards, show Silver Belle growing from a cloud of "ectoplasm".

== Fraud ==
A related spiritualist camp known as Camp Chesterfield in Anderson, Indiana was managed by Mabel Riffle, a cousin of Parrish. The camp was exposed in 1960: infra red film had revealed that the materialized figures were all human and had entered the séance room through a side door.

Camp Silver Belle was also practicing fraudulent mediumship, and had been exposed in various newspapers. Before exposures the camp took in up to a million dollars a year.

The photographs taken by Jack Edwards of Silver Belle materializing were discovered to be a hoax. A photograph was taken of smoke and by a double exposure a cardboard figure was superimposed onto it. The woman standing outside the cabinet curtain was also an accomplice involved in the deception.
