= Connell Mansion =

Historic house in Pennsylvania, United States

- U.S. National Register of Historic Places
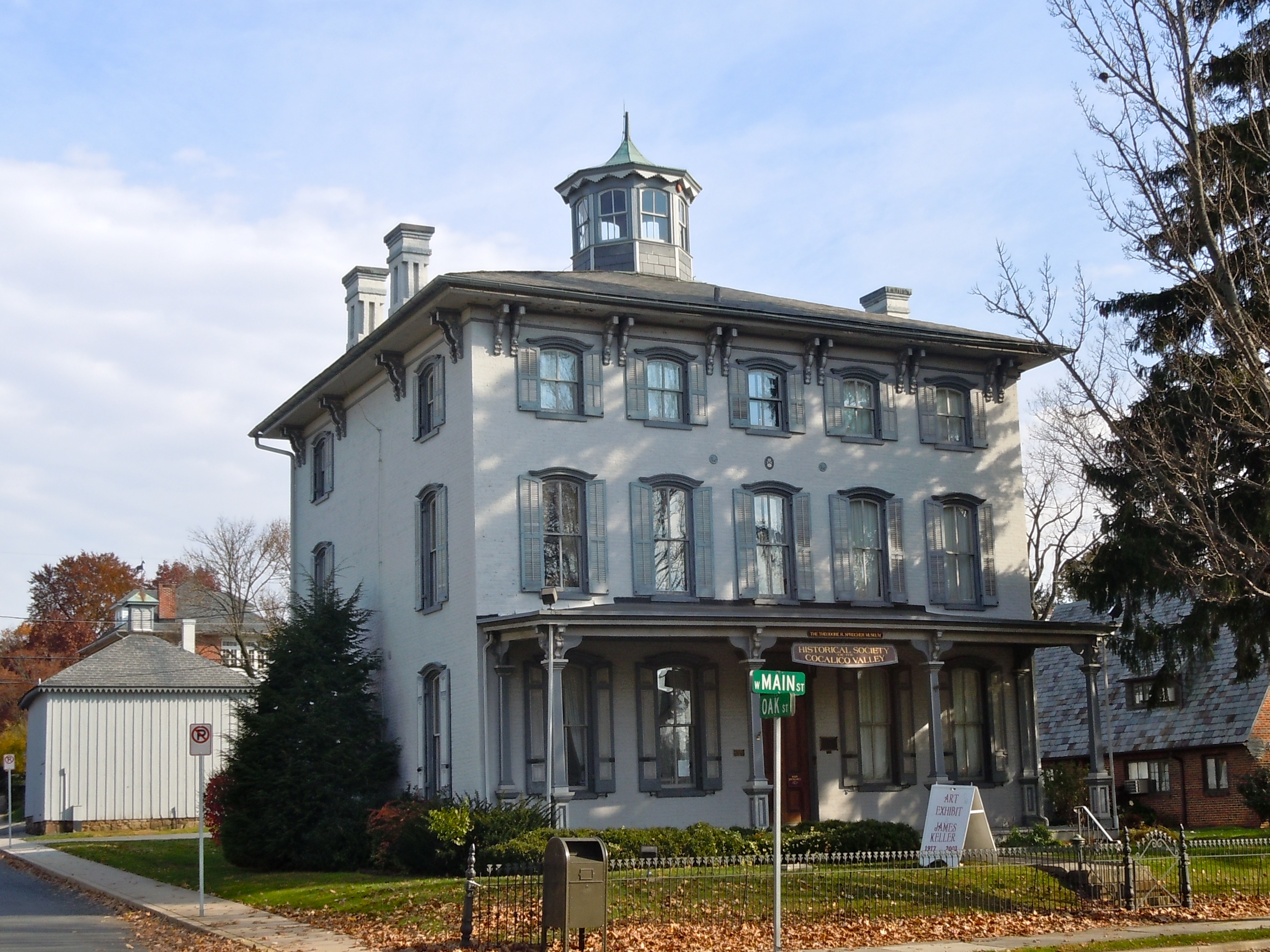
- Connell Mansion, November 2011

- Location within Pennsylvania Location within the United States
- Location: 249 W. Main St., Ephrata, Pennsylvania
- Coordinates: 40°10′51″N 76°10′53″W
- Area: 0.5 acres (0.20 ha)
- Built: c. 1860
- Built by: Connell, Moore
- NRHP reference No.: 79002254
- Added to NRHP: January 19, 1979

Connell Mansion is a historic home located at Ephrata, Lancaster County, Pennsylvania. It was built about 1860, and is a three-story, brick dwelling with a low hipped slate roof and octagonal cupola. It has a two-story, rear section with a one-story extension, both with gable roofs. Also on the property are a contributing carriage house and frame privy.

It was listed on the National Register of Historic Places in 1979.
