= Mentzer Building =

- U.S. National Register of Historic Places
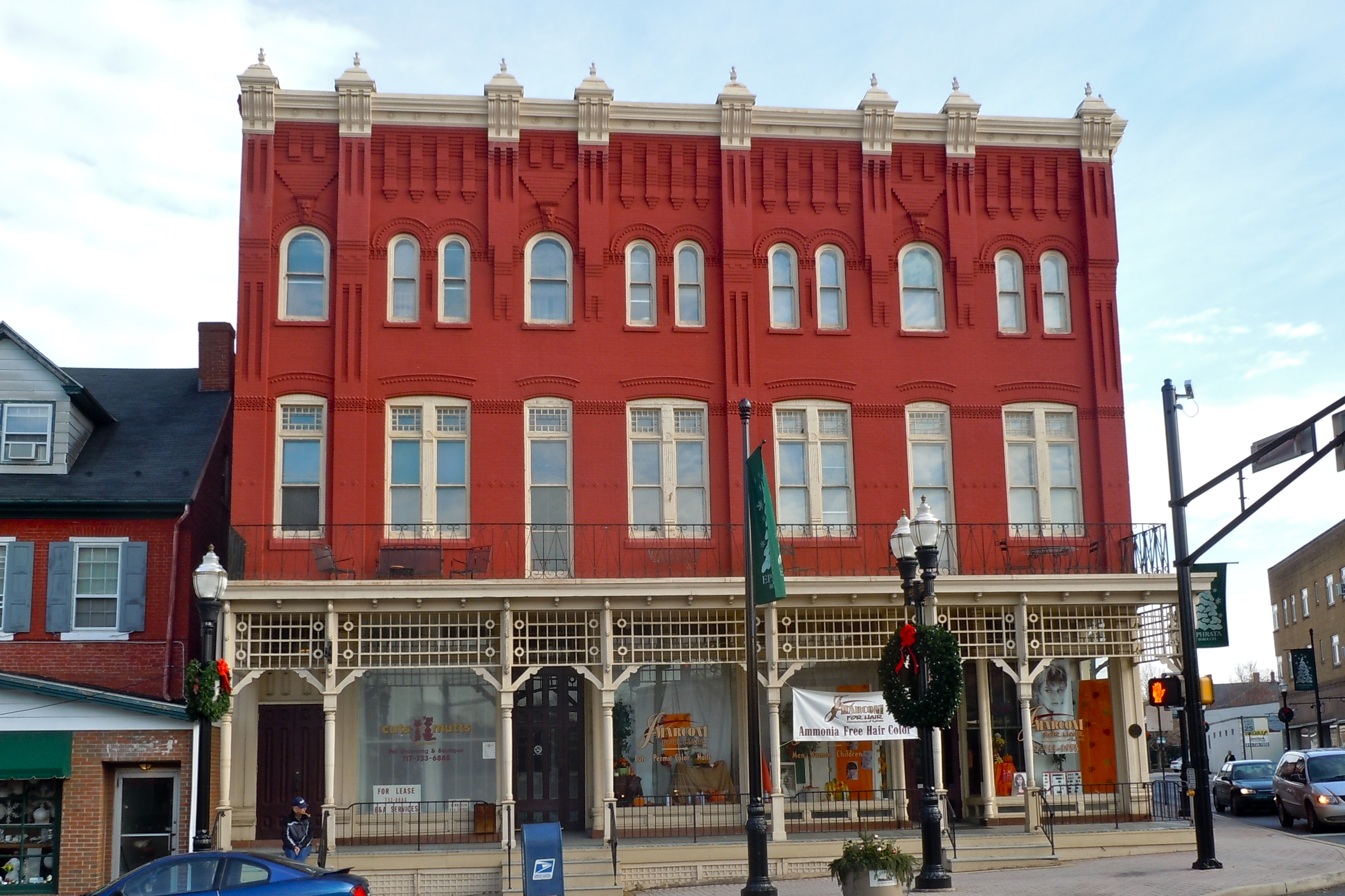
- Mentzer Building, November 2011

- Location within Pennsylvania Location within the United States
- Location: 3 W. Main St., Ephrata, Pennsylvania
- Coordinates: 40°10′47″N 76°10′44″W
- Area: 0.1 acres (0.040 ha)
- Built: 1889
- Architectural style: Queen Anne
- NRHP reference No.: 85000466
- Added to NRHP: March 7, 1985

Mentzer Building is a historic commercial building located at Ephrata, Lancaster County, Pennsylvania. It was built in 1889, and is a three-story, brick building in the Queen Anne style. The building has housed school classrooms, barbershops, an electric supply store, meeting rooms, and retail clothing sales shops. The porch and entrance have been restored based on historical photographs.

It was listed on the National Register of Historic Places in 1985. It is located in the Ephrata Commercial Historic District.
