= Akron, Pennsylvania =

Borough in Pennsylvania, US

- Borough
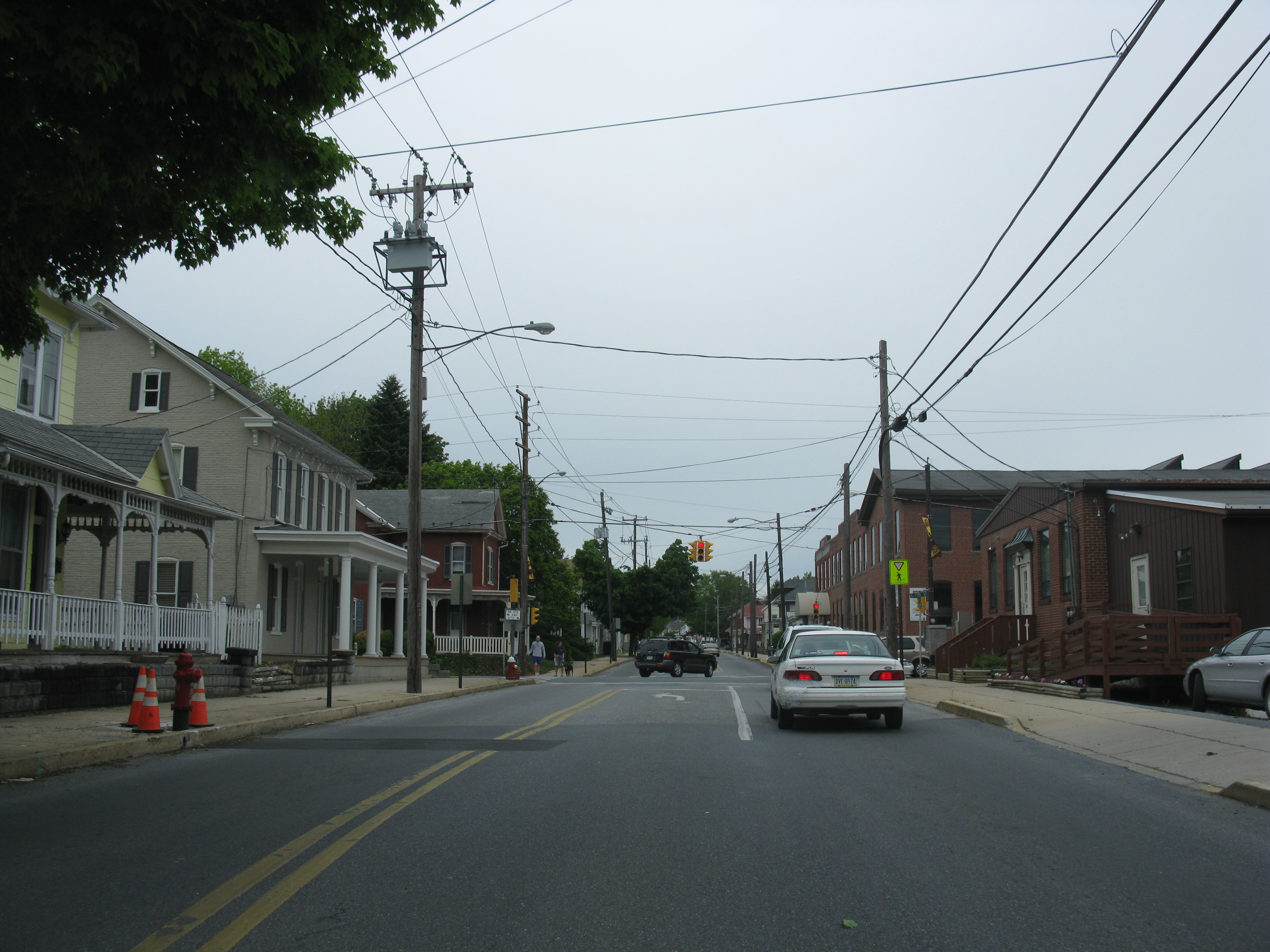
- Main Street at Pennsylvania Route 272

- Location of Akron in Lancaster County, Pennsylvania (left) and of Lancaster County in Pennsylvania (right)

- Location in Pennsylvania Location in the United States
- Coordinates: 40°09′23″N 76°12′14″W
- Country: United States
- State: Pennsylvania
- County: Lancaster

Government
  - Mayor: John McBeth

Area
  - Total: 1.23 sq mi (3.19 km^{2})
  - Land: 1.23 sq mi (3.18 km^{2})
  - Water: 0.0077 sq mi (0.02 km^{2})
- Elevation: 509 ft (155 m)

Population (2020)
  - Total: 4,152
  - Density: 3,385.2/sq mi (1,307.03/km^{2})
- Time zone: UTC-5 (EST)
  - Summer (DST): UTC-4 (EDT)
- ZIP Code: 17501
- Area code: 717
- FIPS code: 42-00540
- Website: www.akron-pa.com

Akron is a borough in Lancaster County, Pennsylvania, United States. As of the 2020 census, it had a population of 4,169.

== History ==
Akron was incorporated as a borough in 1895. Before this point, a small village called New Berlin sat at the center of the borough. A railroad used to run through Akron and served a railroad station in the town. A trolley also used to run in parts of the borough. The railroad has since been abandoned and is now the Warwick to Ephrata Rail Trail.

== Geography ==
Akron is located in northern Lancaster County at 40°9′23″N 76°12′14″W (40.156472, -76.204000). It is bordered to the north by the borough of Ephrata. Two main roads pass through the borough: Main Street and 7th Street (Pennsylvania Route 272). Lancaster, the county seat, is 11 miles (18 km) to the southwest, and Reading is 21 miles (34 km) to the northeast.

The borough is located on a hill. According to the United States Census Bureau, the borough has a total area of 1.23 square miles (3.19 km^{2}), all land. Cocalico Creek forms part of the northern border of the borough and loops past the west side of the borough, leading to the Conestoga River, a tributary of the Susquehanna.

== Demographics ==
Historical population
Census	Pop.	Note	%±
1880	284		—
1890	606		113.4%
1900	653		7.8%
1910	719		10.1%
1920	723		0.6%
1930	747		3.3%
1940	877		17.4%
1950	1,028		17.2%
1960	2,167		110.8%
1970	3,149		45.3%
1980	3,471		10.2%
1990	3,869		11.5%
2000	4,046		4.6%
2010	3,876		−4.2%
2020	4,152		7.1%
2021 (est.)	4,145	▼	−0.2%

=== 2020 census ===
As of the 2020 census, Akron had a population of 4,152. The median age was 39.9 years. 20.5% of residents were under the age of 18 and 18.6% of residents were 65 years of age or older. For every 100 females there were 95.3 males, and for every 100 females age 18 and over there were 94.1 males age 18 and over.

100.0% of residents lived in urban areas, while 0.0% lived in rural areas.

There were 1,741 households in Akron, of which 27.3% had children under the age of 18 living in them. Of all households, 51.3% were married-couple households, 18.0% were households with a male householder and no spouse or partner present, and 24.1% were households with a female householder and no spouse or partner present. About 27.7% of all households were made up of individuals and 10.7% had someone living alone who was 65 years of age or older.

There were 1,787 housing units, of which 2.6% were vacant. The homeowner vacancy rate was 0.5% and the rental vacancy rate was 2.0%.

Racial composition as of the 2020 census
Race	Number	Percent
White	3,636	87.6%
Black or African American	97	2.3%
American Indian and Alaska Native	13	0.3%
Asian	62	1.5%
Native Hawaiian and Other Pacific Islander	4	0.1%
Some other race	110	2.6%
Two or more races	230	5.5%
Hispanic or Latino (of any race)	279	6.7%

=== 2000 census ===
As of the 2000 census, there were 4,046 people, 1,622 households, and 1,138 families residing in the borough. The population density was 3,199.8 people per square mile (1,235.4 people/km^{2}). There were 1,687 housing units at an average density of 1,334.2 per square mile (515.1/km^{2}). The racial makeup of the borough was 96.42% White, 0.54% Black or African American, 0.22% Native American, 1.38% Asian, 0.79% from other races, and 0.64% from two or more races. 2.22% of the population were Hispanic or Latino of any race.

There were 1,622 households, out of which 27.7% had children under the age of 18 living with them, 60.5% were married couples living together, 7.4% had a female householder with no husband present, and 29.8% were non-families. 24.8% of all households were made up of individuals, and 9.1% had someone living alone who was 65 years of age or older. The average household size was 2.41 and the average family size was 2.86.

In the borough the population was spread out, with 21.7% under the age of 18, 6.5% from 18 to 24, 28.3% from 25 to 44, 24.2% from 45 to 64, and 19.3% who were 65 years of age or older. The median age was 41 years. For every 100 females there were 89.9 males. For every 100 females age 18 and over, there were 89.3 males.

The median income for a household in the borough was $45,407, and the median income for a family was $53,365. Males had a median income of $37,061 versus $24,545 for females. The per capita income for the borough was $19,983. About 3.4% of families and 4.6% of the population were below the poverty line, including 4.9% of those under age 18 and 8.1% of those age 65 or over.

== Schools ==
=== Elementary ===
- Akron Elementary in Ephrata Area School District

== Police, government, and fire protection ==
Akron borough is an independent local government unit located in Lancaster County. It is run by an elected borough council and an elected mayor. The current mayor is John McBeth. The borough council is currently run by President Nathan Imhoff. Established in 1893, the Akron Volunteer Fire Company Lancaster County Station 12 has approximately 40 active members and three pieces of current operating fire apparatus: one engine, one rescue engine, and one utility truck.

== Economy ==
The economy is mostly made up of small businesses. There are very few large businesses because the town is small and mostly residential. The American headquarters of the Mennonite Central Committee, which started the Fair Trade retailer Ten Thousand Villages, are located in the town.

== Recreation ==
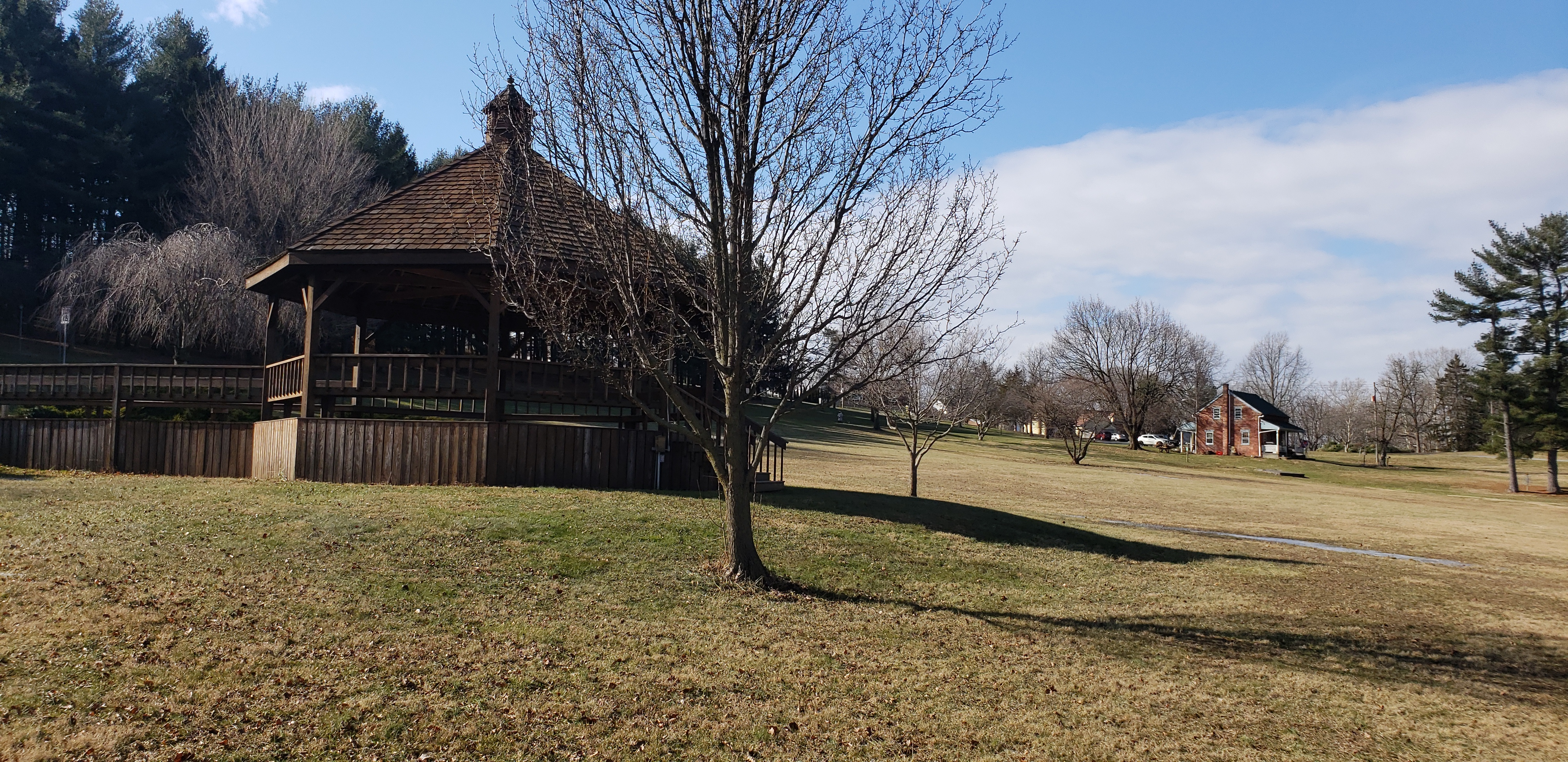
The gazebo at Lloyd H. Roland Memorial Park

Loyd H. Roland Memorial Park (also known as Akron Park), is a 70-plus acre park located on Main Street on the east side of Akron. The park has baseball fields, tennis courts, a beach volleyball court, a basketball court, a playground, hiking trails, a pond, picnic pavilions, a gazebo, and an 18-hole disc golf course.

== Culture ==
Akron is one of the many Pennsylvania towns to drop or raise a unique item at midnight on New Year's Eve. The "Shoe-In" begins several hours before midnight with children's activities, carriage rides, music, and a bonfire. People donate children's shoes which are passed on to the needy. In honor of the area's former shoemaking industry (that used to be located where the Ten-Thousand Villages corporate offices are currently located) a giant sneaker is lowered at midnight.
