= Eby Shoe Corporation buildings =

- Eby Shoe Corporation
- U.S. National Register of Historic Places
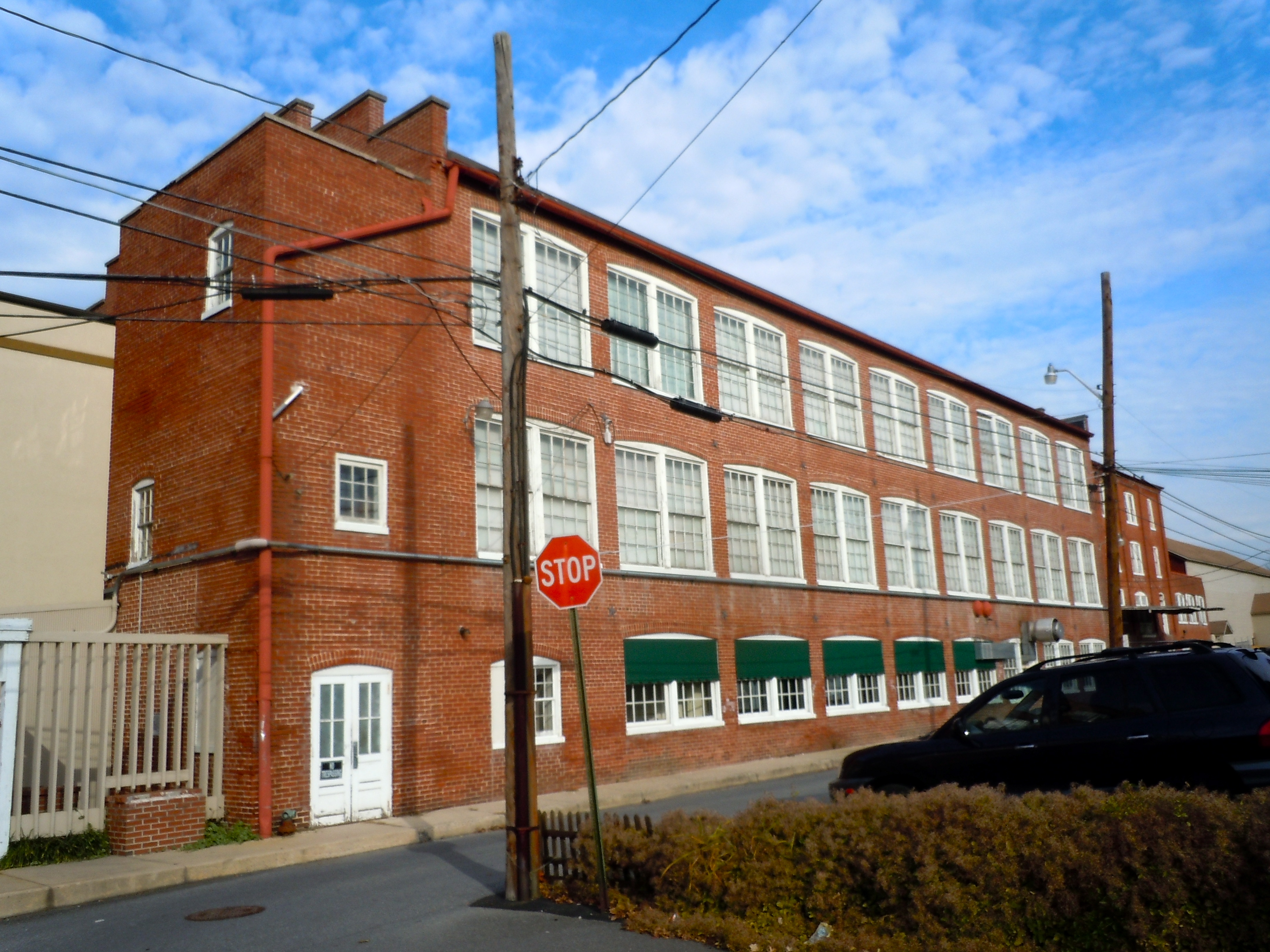
- Building "B," Eby Shoe Corporation, November 2011

- Location within Pennsylvania Location within the United States
- Location: 136 N. State St., Ephrata, Pennsylvania
- Coordinates: 40°10′50″N 76°10′29″W
- Area: 2.1 acres (0.85 ha)
- Built by: Gerhart, Harry M.
- NRHP reference No.: 89001050
- Added to NRHP: August 18, 1989

Eby Shoe Corporation, also known as Fleet-Air Corporation, is a historic factory building complex located at Ephrata, Lancaster County, Pennsylvania. The property includes three contributing buildings to the listing. Building "A" was built about 1900, and is a four-story, gable roofed brick building with a two-story flat roofed addition. Building "B" was built in 1919–1920, and is a three-story, gable roofed brick building measuring 48 feet wide and 115 feet deep. Building "C" was built in 1923, and is a four-story, steel frame building with a brick exterior. It measures 48 feet wide and 180 feet deep. The Eby Shoe Corporation closed in 1985.

It was listed on the National Register of Historic Places in 1989.
