= Ephrata Commercial Historic District =

Historic district in Pennsylvania, United States

- U.S. National Register of Historic Places
- U.S. Historic district
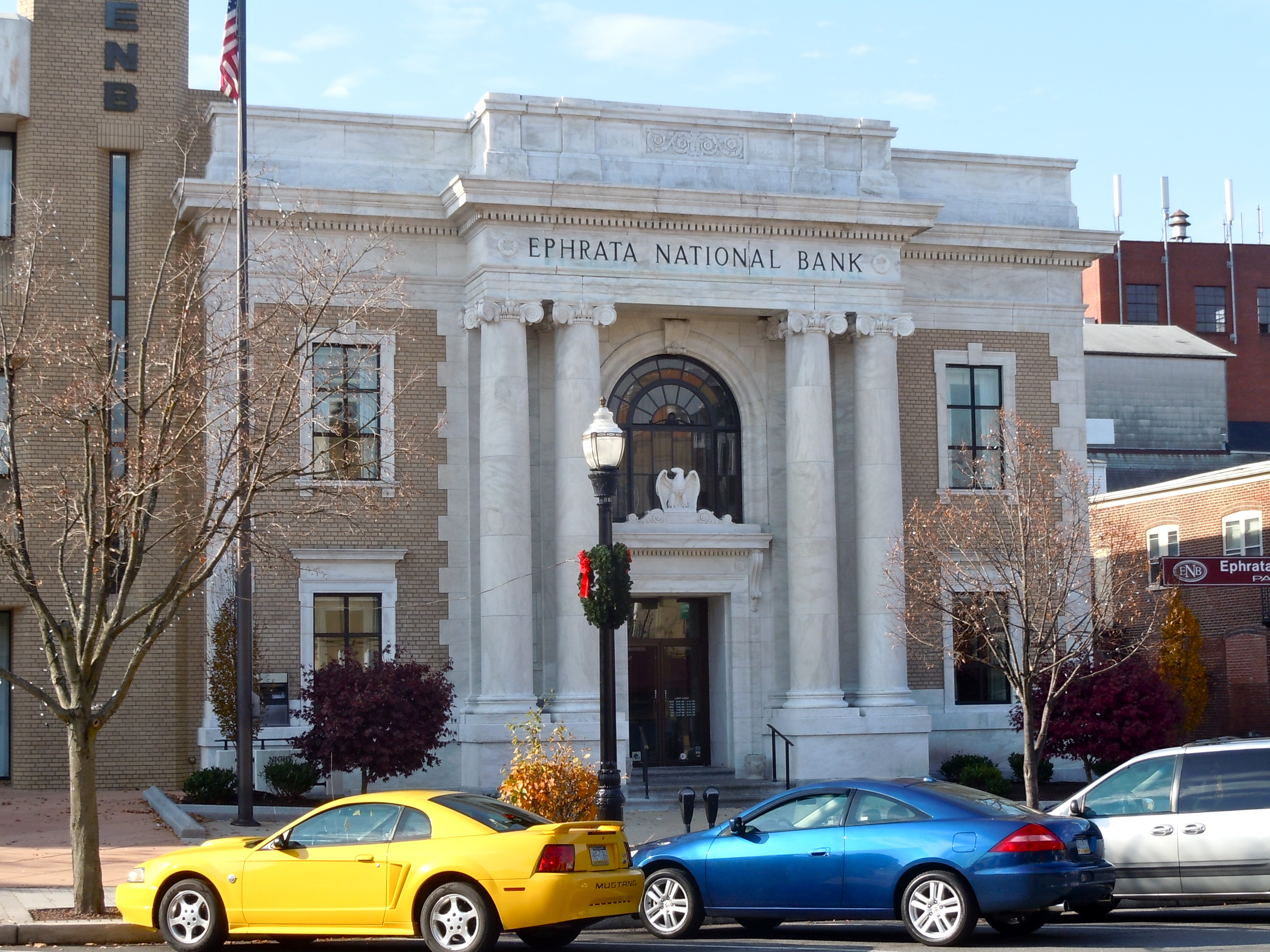
- Ephrata National Bank, November 2011

- Location within Pennsylvania Location within the United States
- Location: Portions of W. Main, E. Main, N. State, S. State Sts., and Washington Ave., Ephrata, Pennsylvania
- Coordinates: 40°10′41″N 76°10′39″W
- Area: 15.3 acres (6.2 ha)
- Architect: Urban, C. Emlen; Evans, Clifton
- Architectural style: Queen Anne, Italianate
- NRHP reference No.: 06001005
- Added to NRHP: November 8, 2006

Ephrata Commercial Historic District is a national historic district located at Ephrata, Lancaster County, Pennsylvania. The district includes 36 contributing buildings in the central business district of Ephrata. It has notable examples of the Queen Anne and Italianate architectural styles and buildings designed by noted Lancaster architect C. Emlen Urban. The oldest building dates to 1808 and is the Eagle Hotel. Other notable buildings include the I.G. Sprecher & Sons Hardware (1911), Richard Heitler House (1820), J.W. Yost Liquor Store (c. 1880), Ephrata Railroad Station (1887–1889), U.S. Post Office (1937), Ephrata National Bank (1925), and Grant and Wenger Feed Mill (1924). Located in the district is the separately listed Mentzer Building.

It was listed on the National Register of Historic Places in 2006.
