= Ephrata Area School District =

School district in Pennsylvania

Location
- Ephrata in Lancaster County, Pennsylvania United States

Other information
- Website: https://easdpa.org/

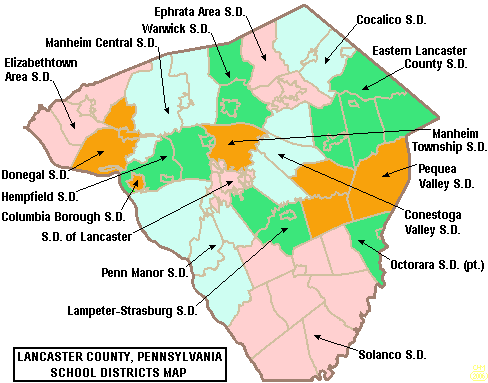
Map of Lancaster County, Pennsylvania public school districts with Ephrata Area School District highlighted in pink in the center of the top (northernmost) edge of the map

The Ephrata Area School District is a midsized, suburban, public school district located in Lancaster County, Pennsylvania, United States. The district encompasses approximately 44 square miles. At the 2000 federal census it served a resident population of 30,458. In 2009 the district residents' annual per capita income was US$19,574, while the median family income was $51,151 a year. The district is a member of Lancaster-Lebanon Intermediate Unit (IU) 13.

== Schools ==
- Akron Elementary School – Akron, Pennsylvania K-4 with 311 pupils and 19 teachers
- Clay Elementary School – Ephrata, Pennsylvania K-4 with 455 pupils and 28 teachers
- Highland Elementary School – Ephrata, Pennsylvania K-5 with 453 pupils and 33 teachers
- Fulton Elementary School – Ephrata, Pennsylvania PreK-5 with 464 pupils and 29 teachers
- Ephrata Area Intermediate School Ephrata, Pennsylvania
- Ephrata Area Middle School
- Ephrata High School
- Ephrata High School at Washington
