= Mountain Springs Hotel =

- U.S. National Register of Historic Places
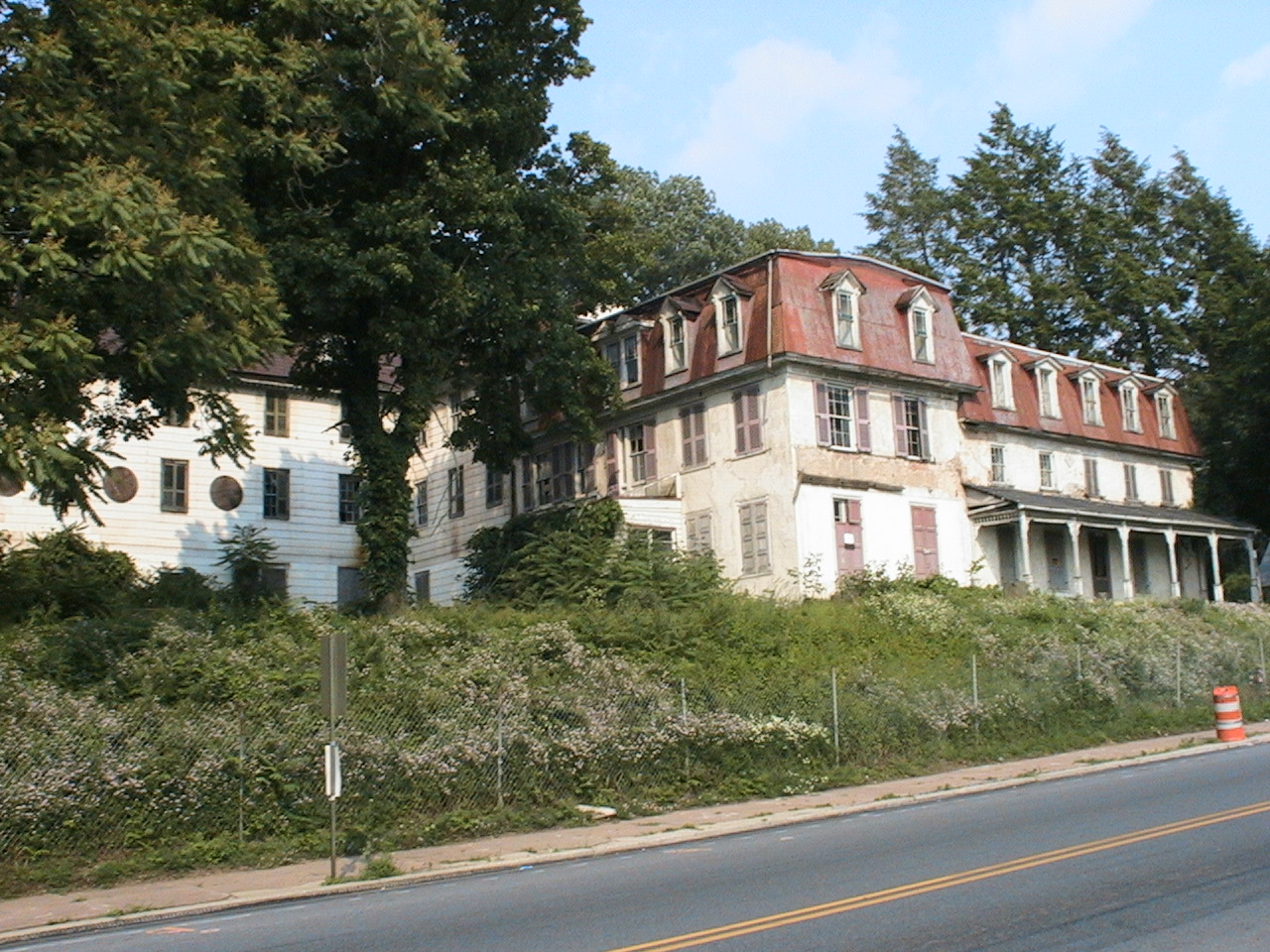
- The hotel before being demolished.

- Location within Pennsylvania
- Location: 320 East Main Street, Ephrata, Pennsylvania
- Coordinates: 40°10′31″N 76°10′21″W
- Built: 1848
- Architect: Joseph Konigmacher
- Architectural style: Mid 19th Century Victorian
- NRHP reference No.: 82003791
- Added to NRHP: March 2, 1982

The Mountain Springs Hotel is listed on the National Register of Historic Places and is located in Ephrata, Pennsylvania, at the corner of East Main Street and Spring Garden Street. It was originally built in 1848 as a summer resort, capitalizing on its natural spring water, and hosted a variety of high-profile guests including several Presidents. The resort lost its popularity in the early 20th century and fell into disrepair, but was eventually purchased and converted into the first hospital in the Ephrata area—serving from 1937 through 1949. It remained under private ownership and became dilapidated over the following decades, culminating in its complete closure in 1988 and the auctioning of its contents in 1991. The following decade was met with a variety of redevelopment proposals, and in the years around the turn of the 21st century it was decided that the property would be redeveloped with another hotel. The majority of the Mountain Springs Hotel was demolished in 2004, retaining a portion of the Konigmacher mansion. Today, a Hampton Inn hotel and Applebee's restaurant occupy the site alongside the restored building from the original Mountain Springs Hotel.

== Hotel & spa resort ==
In 1848, Joseph Konigmacher, a state Senator representing the area, built and established the Konigmacher Mansion as a summer resort facility. It was located at the edge of the Ephrata Ridge, above the center of town, along the turnpike leading toward Downingtown (modern US 322). At this location was a natural mineral spring which gave rise to a renowned spa. By 1860, the original farmstead had grown to a 400-room hotel containing a 60-foot (18 m) high observatory. Under the direction of Senator Konigmacher, the resort grew to become a popular getaway for residents of Philadelphia, New York City, and Baltimore, and included visitors such as Presidents Lincoln, Grant, and Buchanan; and also Thaddeus Stevens. In its heyday, a trolley line connected the resort with the town's rail station further downhill. After the death of Joseph Konigmacher in 1861, the Mountains Springs Hotel continued to operate into the early 20th century, but was ultimately closed in the early 1900s. It remained in the hands of its sole owner Mr. D. S. Von Nieda.

== Hospital ==
A spiritualist group named Camp Silver Belle met Mr. and Mrs. John Stephan, an Ephrata couple, in Florida during the 1930s. Together, the couple and the group bought what was to eventually become the Ephrata Park. This property was used for meetings, conferences, services, and vacations, until in 1935 the local American Legion Post 429 bought the park property. Camp Silver Belle subsequently purchased the Mountain Springs Hotel property from the Von Neida family. By this point, the hotel had been closed for approximately 30 years and had entered a state of considerable disrepair.

The area had been proposing tentative plans for a local hospital as early as 1918, as at the time the nearest hospitals were in Lancaster. On 20 June 1937, the Silver Belle group, in its publication Spiritual Truth, announced that the Camp was establishing the Stephan Memorial Hospital on the property of the Mountain Springs Hotel. The facility was dedicated to the Stephans, who had since died. The new hospital was declared a non-profit organization and was supervised by Mr. Henry Munch, with his wife as assistant and director of nursing. Mr. and Mrs. Daniel Von Nieda helped to operate the new hospital. At its dedication, the nursing staff consisted of Laura Shirk of Ephrata and Mary Einwechter of Audubon, New Jersey. Initial plans anticipated constructing a hospital of brick and concrete block along Spring Garden Street, though these plans were never realized.

Nearly three years later, on 31 May 1940, the Court of Common Pleas in Lancaster granted a charter to the institution such that it would be named the Ephrata Community Hospital. The hospital provided a full range of services among its 16-bed facility, including surgery and x-rays. An ambulance was supplied and maintained by the American Legion Post 429 until approximately 1960. In a one-year period between May 1946 and May 1948, the hospital cared for 58 medical, 414 surgical, 280 obstetrical, and 267 newborn patients. Preceding this, in 1943, the Board recognized that a new, larger, and better-equipped hospital would be necessary, prompting a fundraising drive beginning in May 1943. By July 1947, a new site was chosen on Martin Street, in the Arlington neighborhood of Ephrata. Ground was broken began that year and in 1948, local judge Guy K. Bard presented an address at the ceremonial laying of the cornerstone. Construction continued until autumn 1949, when from 29 October through 6 November the hospital hosted an open house of the new facility; and on the 6th, the new hospital was officially unlocked by Burgess David E. Good and, along with Rev. Andre, performed the formal dedication. The first patient was moved in the following day, on 7 November 1949.

== Disrepair ==
The hotel's site was added to the National Register of Historic Places on 2 March 1982. The hotel's site remained privately occupied until 1988, when the property was completely closed. Since the founding of the new Ephrata Community Hospital, the Mountain Springs facility fell into considerable disrepair, sprouting local legends and becoming known as the "haunted house" among local children. The contents of the hotel were sold at an on-site auction in 1991. Throughout the 1990s and into the early 2000s, a variety of reuse proposals were considered and rejected. A July 1992 proposal planned to subdivide 8.3 acres (34,000 m^{2}) of the property for redevelopment, to reuse the frame hotel building, but to demolish some of the oldest structures on the property.

== Modern Hotel ==
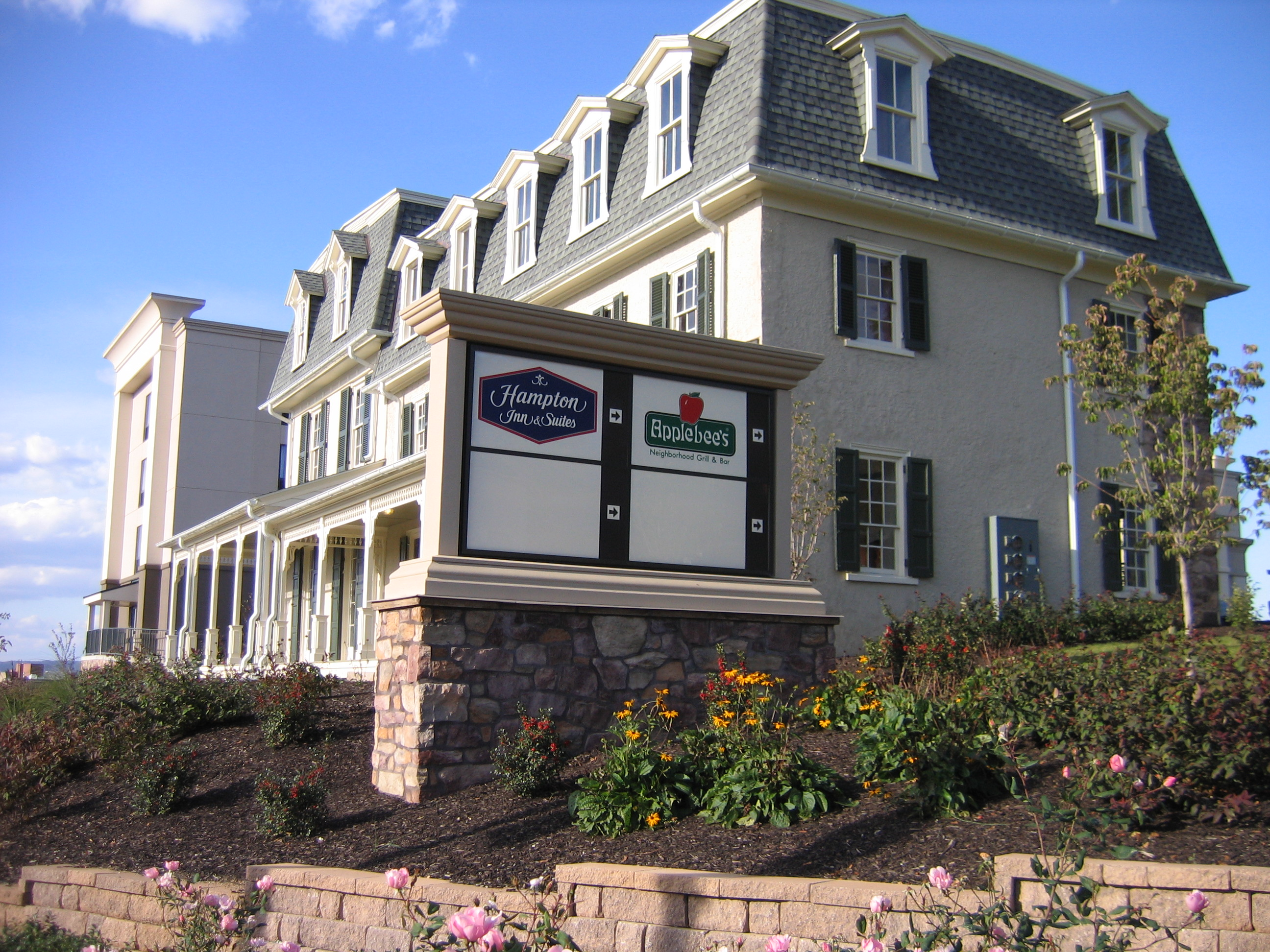
The modern hotel

In December 1999, the Ephrata Economic Development Corporation (EEDC) received a grant from the Ephrata Borough facilitating the purchase of the Mountain Springs Hotel property. Local planning efforts within the community—including the Downtown Visioning Process of 2002—consistently identified the need to reestablish a hotel on the 8-acre (32,000 m^{2}) site, intended to serve as a focal point for the revitalization of the downtown area. Over the following years, the EEDC entered the property into the Keystone Opportunity Program run by the State, securing a $2.6 million Commonwealth Redevelopment Capital Assistance Program grant to create a hotel on the site.

The majority of the Mountain Springs property was demolished in 2004, leaving only a portion of the Konigmacher mansion. Much of the property was cleared and regraded to make way for a new Hampton Inn hotel and an Applebee's restaurant. The remaining building was restored. The new hotel opened in 2005.

== See also ==
- National Register of Historic Places listings in Lancaster County, Pennsylvania
