= Conrad Beissel =

German-American religious leader (1691–1768)

- Church: Schwarzenau Brethren

Personal details
- Born: Johann Conrad Beissel; March 1, 1691 Eberbach, Electoral Palatinate, Holy Roman Empire
- Died: July 6, 1768 (aged 77) Ephrata, Pennsylvania, U.S.

Johann Conrad Beissel (March 1, 1691 – July 6, 1768) was a German-born religious leader who in 1732 founded the Ephrata Community in the Province of Pennsylvania.

== Early life ==
Beissel was born in Eberbach then part of the Holy Roman Empire, and emigrated to Pennsylvania in 1720. Beissel had intended to join a commune of hermits founded there by Johannes Kelpius, but Kelpius had died in 1708. Beissel met with Conrad Matthaei, an associate who became his principal spiritual confidant. The group around Kelpius had arrived in 1694. They settled on a ridge above the Wissahickon Creek. There they prayed, meditated, and watched the stars looking for signs of the coming kingdom of Christ. They also taught children of the community. Some were celibate until death; others married.

== Ephrata Cloister ==
In 1732 Beissel established a semi-monastic Baptist community called the Camp of the Solitary, with a convent (the Sister House) and a monastery (the Brother House) at Ephrata, in what is now Lancaster County, Pennsylvania. The settlement eventually came to be known as the Ephrata Cloister.

Celibacy was considered a virtue, but not obligatory. Each member adopted a new name, and Beissel was called Friedsam, to which the community afterward added the title of Gottrecht. Believing families settled near the community, accepted Beissel as their spiritual leader, and worshipped with the community on the Sabbath. They were influenced by Schwarzenau Brethren thought.

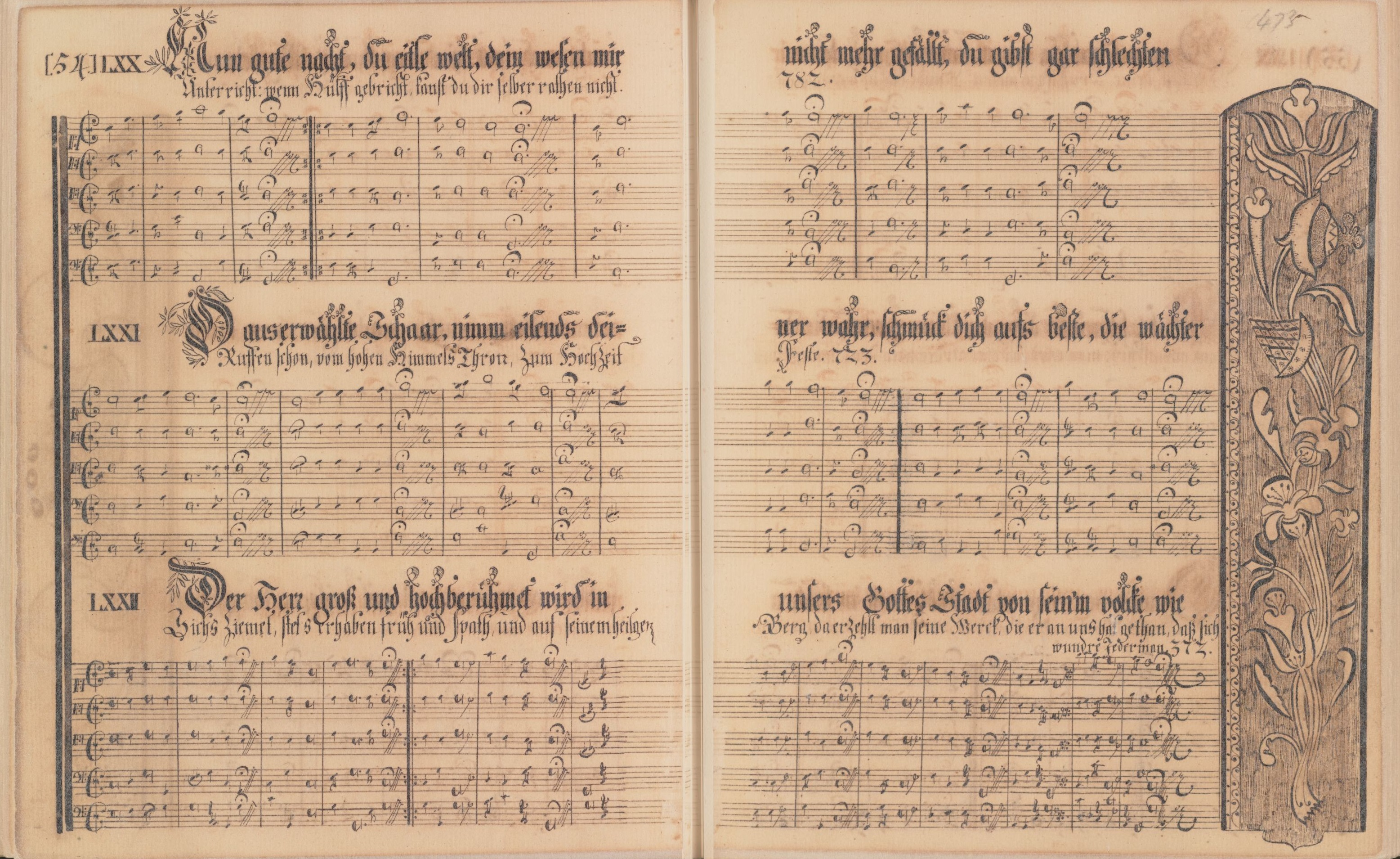
Ephrata Community Manuscript hymnal, 1746

Beissel served as the community's composer as well as its spiritual leader. He devised his own system of musical composition intended to simplify the process by relying on pre-determined sequences of "master notes" and "servant notes" to create harmony. This was mentioned in Thomas Mann's Doctor Faustus as a precursor to serialism.

Beissel's colony was noted for its printing facilities. After Beissel's death and the disruption of the war years of the American Revolution, the utopian community declined in population. Failing to attract sufficient members, its people assimilated into the general Baptist community.

=== Veganism ===
Beissel was one of the first vegetarians in North America who was motivated by Christian religious belief. The entire Ephrata community reportedly abstained from meat eating, which Beissel considered spiritually undesirable.

Beissel invented a vegan diet for the Ephrata community that excluded all meat, dairy, eggs and honey. His diet consisted of buckwheat, cabbage, fruit, green vegetables, potatoes and wheat.

== Death ==
He died on July 6, 1768 at the Ephrata Cloister.

== Works ==
ed. Peter C. Erb, Johann Conrad Beissel and the Ephrata Community. Mystical and Historical Texts, Lewiston, NY: 1985 (contains selected works)
