= Ephrata High School (Pennsylvania) =

Ephrata Senior High School

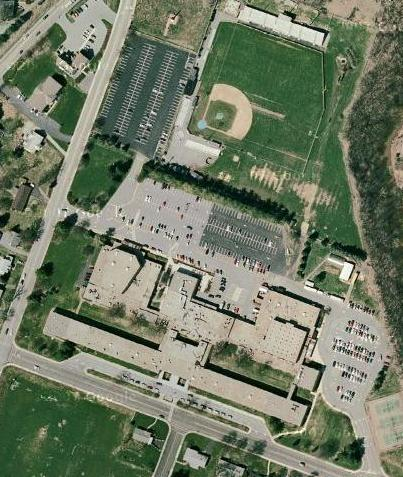
- USGS image of Ephrata High School

Location
- 803 Oak Boulevard; Ephrata, Pennsylvania, (Lancaster County), 17522; United States; 40.180°N 76.191°W

Information
- School type: Public, secondary
- School district: Ephrata Area School District
- Principal: Scott Galen
- Staff: 104.55 (FTE)
- Enrollment: 1,357 (2023–2024)
- Student to teacher ratio: 12.98
- Colors: Purple and gold
- Team name: Mountaineers
- Yearbook: The Cloisterette
- Website: www.easdpa.org/o/ehs
- Ephrata Mount athletic logo

Ephrata High School is a sub-urban/urban, public secondary school in the Ephrata Area School District located in Ephrata in Lancaster County, Pennsylvania, United States.

== Washington Education Center ==
Washington Educational Center is on Marshall Street in Ephrata Borough. It opened in October 1999, in the vacant former Washington Elementary School, as an alternative for students who could not complete the requirements of a traditional education. In 2011, the school board changed the classification of the school to a second high school in the school district. The new status means that, upon successful completion or requirements, students receive an Ephrata High School diploma.

== Sports ==
Though Ephrata has a sports program, they have not performed well at any sport. Ephrata boys soccer hardly made districts this year.

== Extracurriculars ==
The district offers a wide variety of clubs, activities and sports. The marching band was ranked in the top 10 best schools in the nation in 2014.

== Notable alumni ==
- Jackson Davis, actor, Lonelygirl15
- Mike Mentzer, professional bodybuilder and 1979 Mr. Olympia heavyweight champion
- Ray Mentzer, AAU Mr. America
- Joanne Parrott, former member of Maryland House of Delegates
- Evelyn Ay Sempier, Miss America in 1954
- Whitey Von Nieda, former NBA player
