= Ephrata, Pennsylvania =

Borough in Pennsylvania, US

Ephrata, Pennsylvania Effridaa (Pennsylvania German)
- Borough
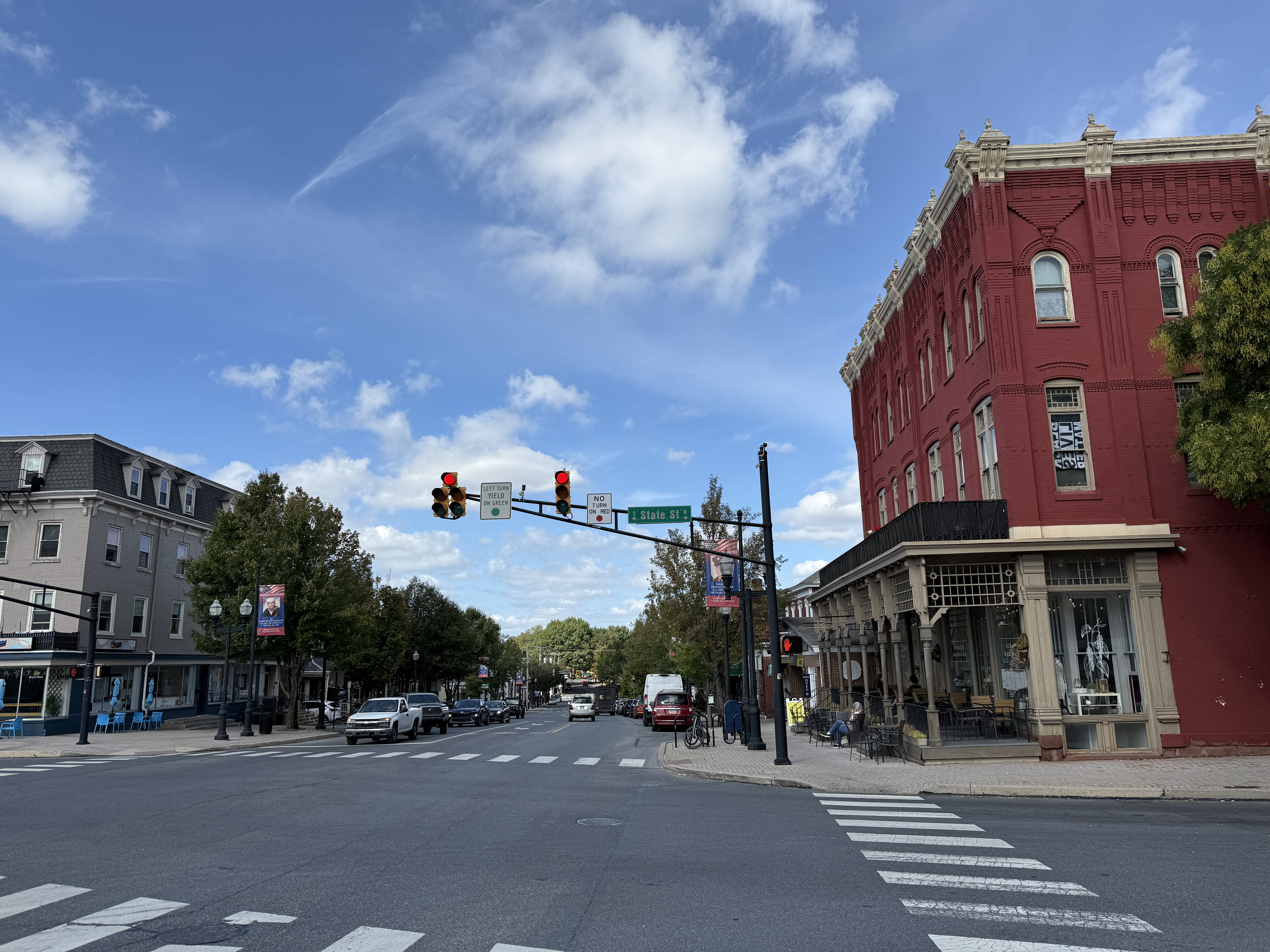
- Main Street in Ephrata, 2025

- Logo
- Etymology: Ephrath
- Location of Ephrata in Lancaster County, Pennsylvania

- Location in Pennsylvania Location in the United States
- Coordinates: 40°10′51″N 76°10′57″W
- Country: United States
- State: Pennsylvania
- County: Lancaster
- Incorporated: August 22, 1891
- Named for: Ephrath

Government
  - Mayor: Thomas G. Reinhold

Area
  - Total: 3.46 sq mi (8.97 km^{2})
  - Land: 3.42 sq mi (8.85 km^{2})
  - Water: 0.042 sq mi (0.11 km^{2})
- Elevation: 358 ft (109 m)

Population (2020)
  - Total: 13,794
  - Density: 4,035.7/sq mi (1,558.18/km^{2})
- Time zone: UTC-5 (EST)
  - Summer (DST): UTC-4 (EDT)
- ZIP Code: 17522
- Area codes: 717
- FIPS code: 42-23832
- Website: ephrataboro.org

Ephrata (/ˈɛfrətə/ EF-rə-tə; Pennsylvania German: Effridaa) is a borough in Lancaster County, Pennsylvania, United States. It is located 42 miles (68 km) east of Harrisburg and about 60 miles (97 km) west-northwest of Philadelphia and is named after Ephrath, the former name for current-day Bethlehem. In its early history, Ephrata was a pleasure resort and an agricultural community.

Ephrata's population has steadily grown over the last century. In 1900, 2,452 people lived there, and by 1940, the population had increased to 6,199. The population was 13,794 at the 2020 census. Ephrata is the most populous borough in Lancaster County.

Ephrata's sister city is Eberbach, Germany, the city where its founders originated.

== History ==
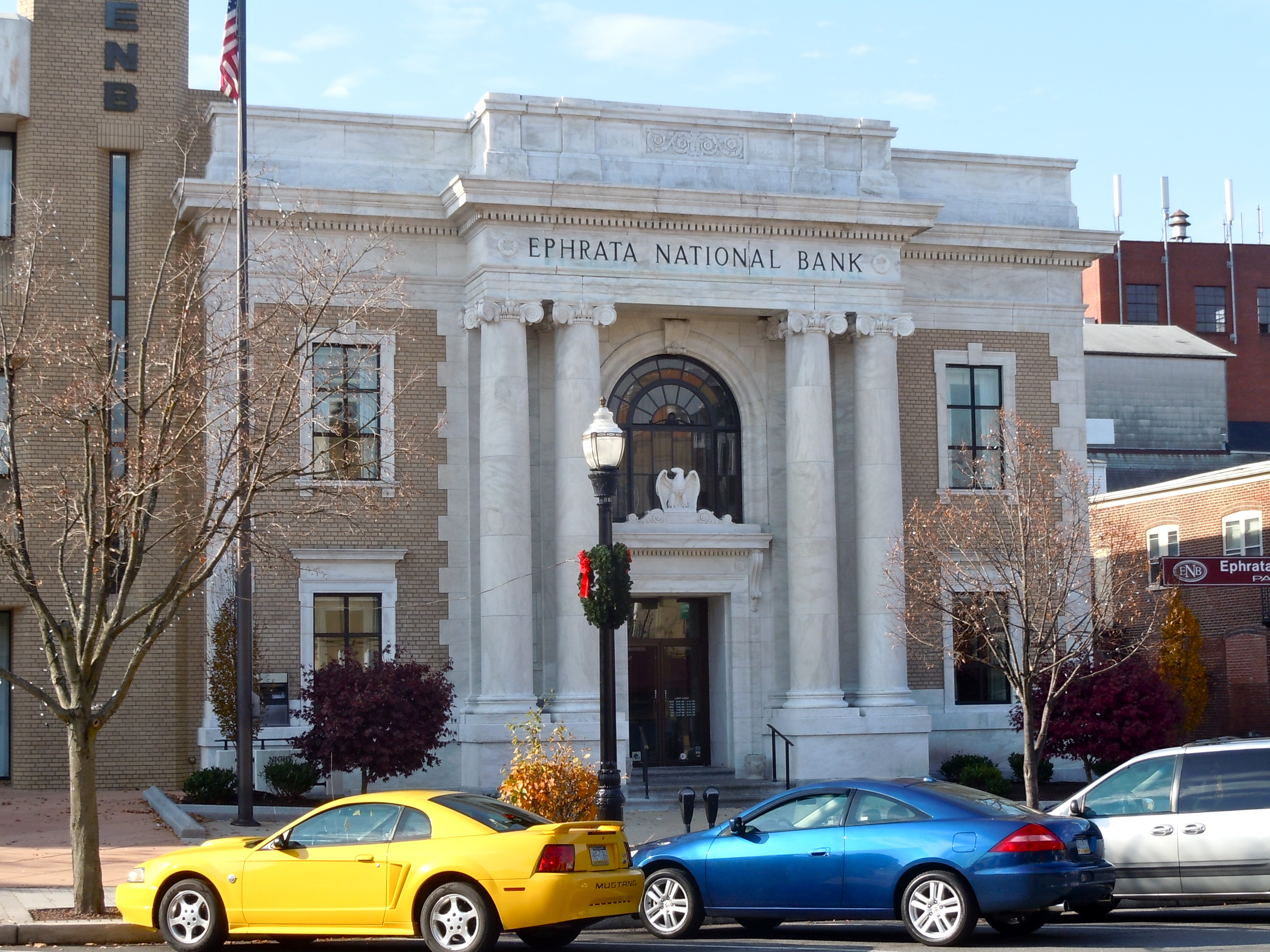
The Ephrata National Bank building, designed by C. Emlen Urban

Ephrata is noteworthy for having been the former seat of the Mystic Order of the Solitary, a semimonastic order of Seventh-Day Dunkers. The community, which contained both men and women, was founded by Johann Conrad Beissel in 1732.

Many of the members were well-educated; Peter Miller, second prior of the monastery, translated the Declaration of Independence into seven languages, at the request of Congress. At the period of its greatest prosperity, the community contained nearly 300 persons.

The Ephrata Commercial Historic District, Ephrata Cloister, Eby Shoe Corporation buildings, Connell Mansion, Mentzer Building, and Mountain Springs Hotel are listed on the National Register of Historic Places.

== Geography ==
Ephrata is located in northeastern Lancaster County, Pennsylvania at 40°10′51″N 76°10′57″W (40.17870, −76.17744). U.S. Route 322 passes through the center of the borough as Main Street; it leads northwest 28 miles (45 km) to Hershey and southeast 35 miles (56 km) to West Chester. Pennsylvania Route 272 passes through the northwest side of Ephrata, leading northeast 8 miles (13 km) to Adamstown and southwest 13 miles (21 km) to Lancaster, the county seat. Like the rest of the county, the surrounding land is mostly flat and suitable for farming.

According to the U.S. Census Bureau, the borough has a total area of 3.4 square miles (8.8 km^{2}), of which 0.04 square miles (0.10 km^{2}), or 1.27%, are water. Cocalico Creek flows through the borough just north of the center of town; it is a southwest-flowing tributary of the Conestoga River and part of the Susquehanna River watershed.

Ephrata has a hot-summer humid continental climate (Dfa), and average monthly temperatures range from 30.0 °F (−1.1 °C) in January to 74.6 °F (23.7 °C) in July. The hardiness zone is 6b.

== Demographics ==
Historical population
Census	Pop.	Note	%±
1880	392		—
1900	2,451		—
1910	3,192		30.2%
1920	3,735		17.0%
1930	4,988		33.5%
1940	6,199		24.3%
1950	7,027		13.4%
1960	7,688		9.4%
1970	3,532		−54.1%
1980	4,789		35.6%
1990	7,116		48.6%
2000	13,213		85.7%
2010	13,394		1.4%
2020	13,794		3.0%
2021 (est.)	13,736	▼	−0.4%

=== 2020 census ===
As of the 2020 census, Ephrata had a population of 13,794. The median age was 38.4 years. 21.9% of residents were under the age of 18 and 17.6% of residents were 65 years of age or older. For every 100 females there were 95.2 males, and for every 100 females age 18 and over there were 92.4 males age 18 and over.

100.0% of residents lived in urban areas, while 0.0% lived in rural areas.

There were 5,730 households in Ephrata, of which 27.5% had children under the age of 18 living in them. Of all households, 46.0% were married-couple households, 20.1% were households with a male householder and no spouse or partner present, and 25.6% were households with a female householder and no spouse or partner present. About 30.9% of all households were made up of individuals and 12.2% had someone living alone who was 65 years of age or older.

There were 5,936 housing units, of which 3.5% were vacant. The homeowner vacancy rate was 0.9% and the rental vacancy rate was 3.5%.

Racial composition as of the 2020 census
Race	Number	Percent
White	11,898	86.3%
Black or African American	218	1.6%
American Indian and Alaska Native	58	0.4%
Asian	175	1.3%
Native Hawaiian and Other Pacific Islander	5	0.0%
Some other race	472	3.4%
Two or more races	968	7.0%
Hispanic or Latino (of any race)	1,197	8.7%

=== 2000 census ===
As of the 2000 census, there were 13,213 people, 5,477 households, and 3,565 families residing in the borough. The population density was 3,672.7 people per square mile (1,418.0 people/km^{2}). There were 5,672 housing units at an average density of 1,576.6 per square mile (608.7/km^{2}). The racial makeup of the borough was 96.10% White, 0.64% Black or African American, 0.26% Native American, 1.06% Asian, 0.14% Pacific Islander, 0.82% from other races, and 0.98% from two or more races. 2.75% of the population were Hispanic or Latino of any race.

There were 5,477 households, out of which 30.1% had children under the age of 18 living with them, 52.6% were married couples living together, 8.6% had a female householder with no husband present, and 34.9% were non-families. 28.6% of all households were made up of individuals, and 11.1% had someone living alone who was 65 years of age or older. The average household size was 2.38 and the average family size was 2.94.

In the borough, the population was spread out, with 24.0% under the age of 18, 8.5% from 18 to 24, 32.1% from 25 to 44, 21.6% from 45 to 64, and 13.9% who were 65 years of age or older. The median age was 36 years. For every 100 females, there were 95.6 males. For every 100 females age 18 and over, there were 92.7 males.

The median income for a household in the borough was $41,550, and the median income for a family was $48,213. Males had a median income of $35,095 versus $22,782 for females. The per capita income for the borough was $19,659. About 3.7% of families and 6.2% of the population were below the poverty line, including 5.5% of those under age 18 and 7.4% of those age 65 or over.

== Community pool ==
The Borough of Ephrata owns and operates the Ephrata Community Pool at 418 Vine Street. The pool is the oldest continuously operating swimming pool in Lancaster County, finishing its 84th year of operation in September 2015. A newly remodeled pool, opened on May 26, 2012, contains zero-depth entries, flume slides, and climbing walls, among other features.

== Libraries ==
Akron borough council cut the line item for the Ephrata Public Library from its $1.9 million proposed general budget for 2023. It has not yet voted to ratify that budget.

== Schools ==
Schools in Ephrata are part of the Ephrata Area School District.

=== Elementary ===
- Akron Elementary School
- Clay Elementary School
- Fulton Elementary School
- Highland Elementary School

=== Middle ===
- Ephrata Middle School

=== High ===
- Ephrata High School

== Economy ==
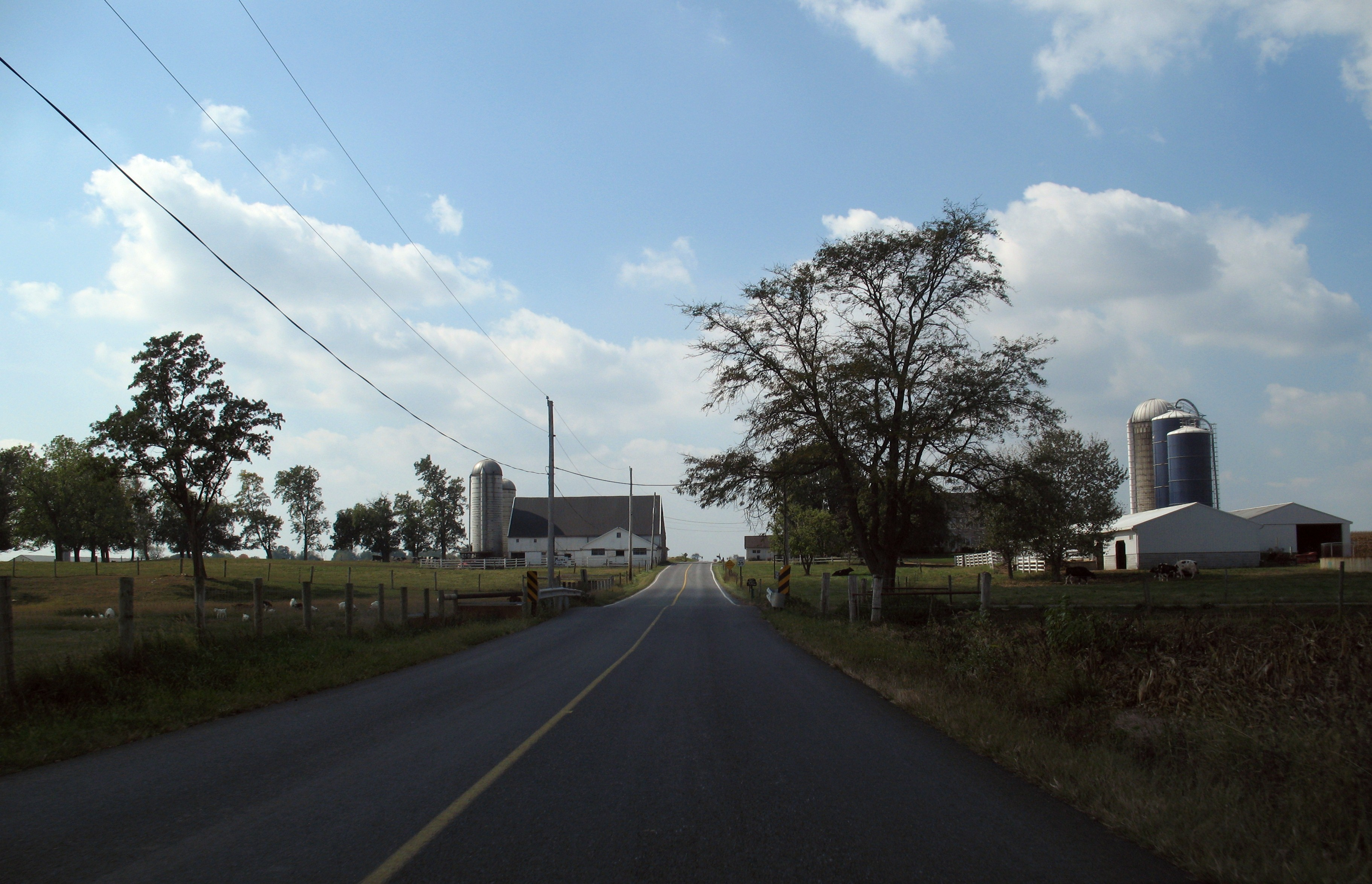
Ephrata is surrounded primarily by rural areas

Ephrata has a mix of large and small businesses of many types, including produce distributor Four Seasons Produce, founded in 1976.

== Religion ==
Ephrata has a diverse mix of churches and faith groups, primarily Christian. The countryside surrounding Ephrata is home to a large number of Amish and Old Order Mennonite families.

== Public services ==
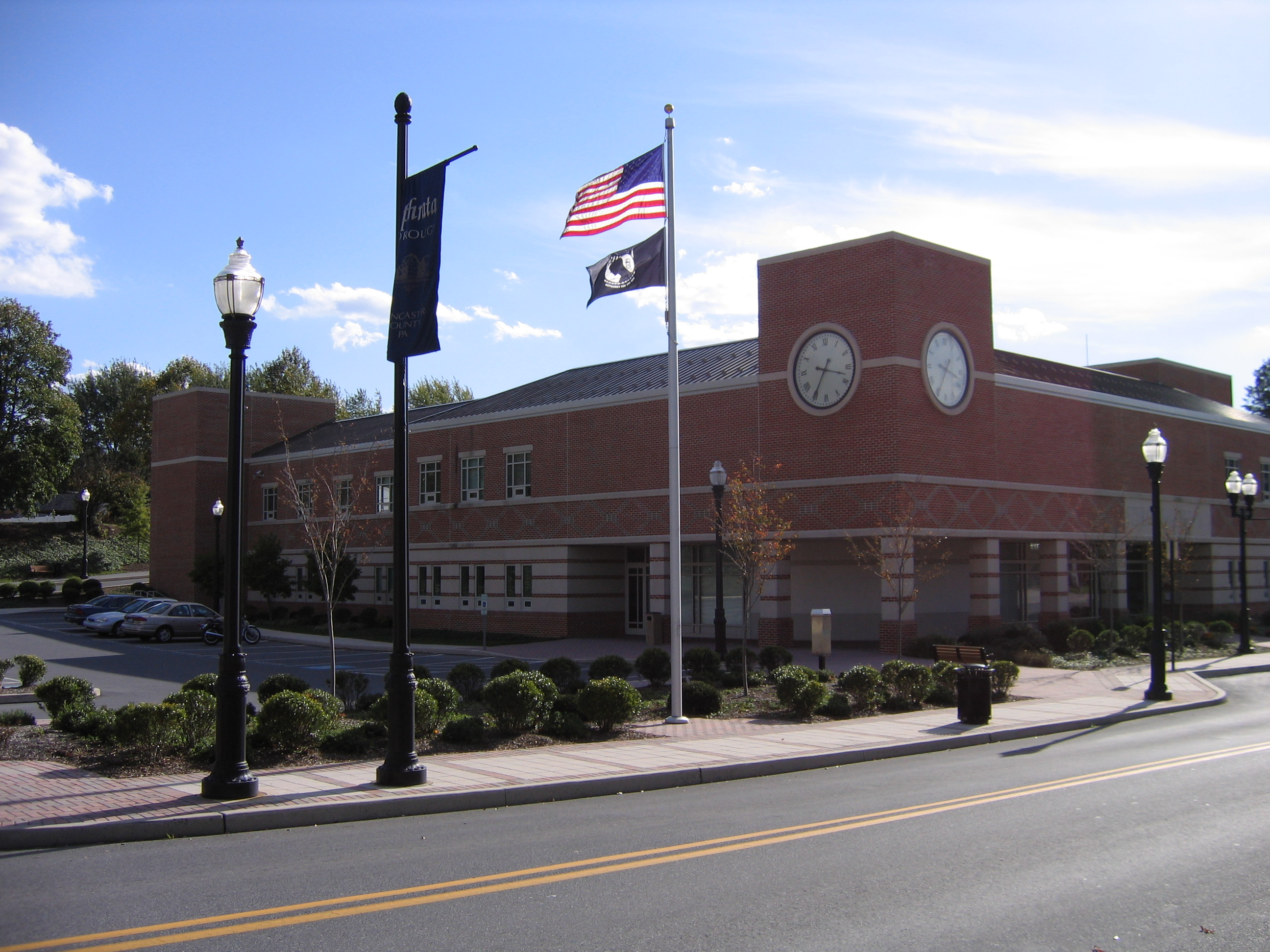
Ephrata Borough Hall

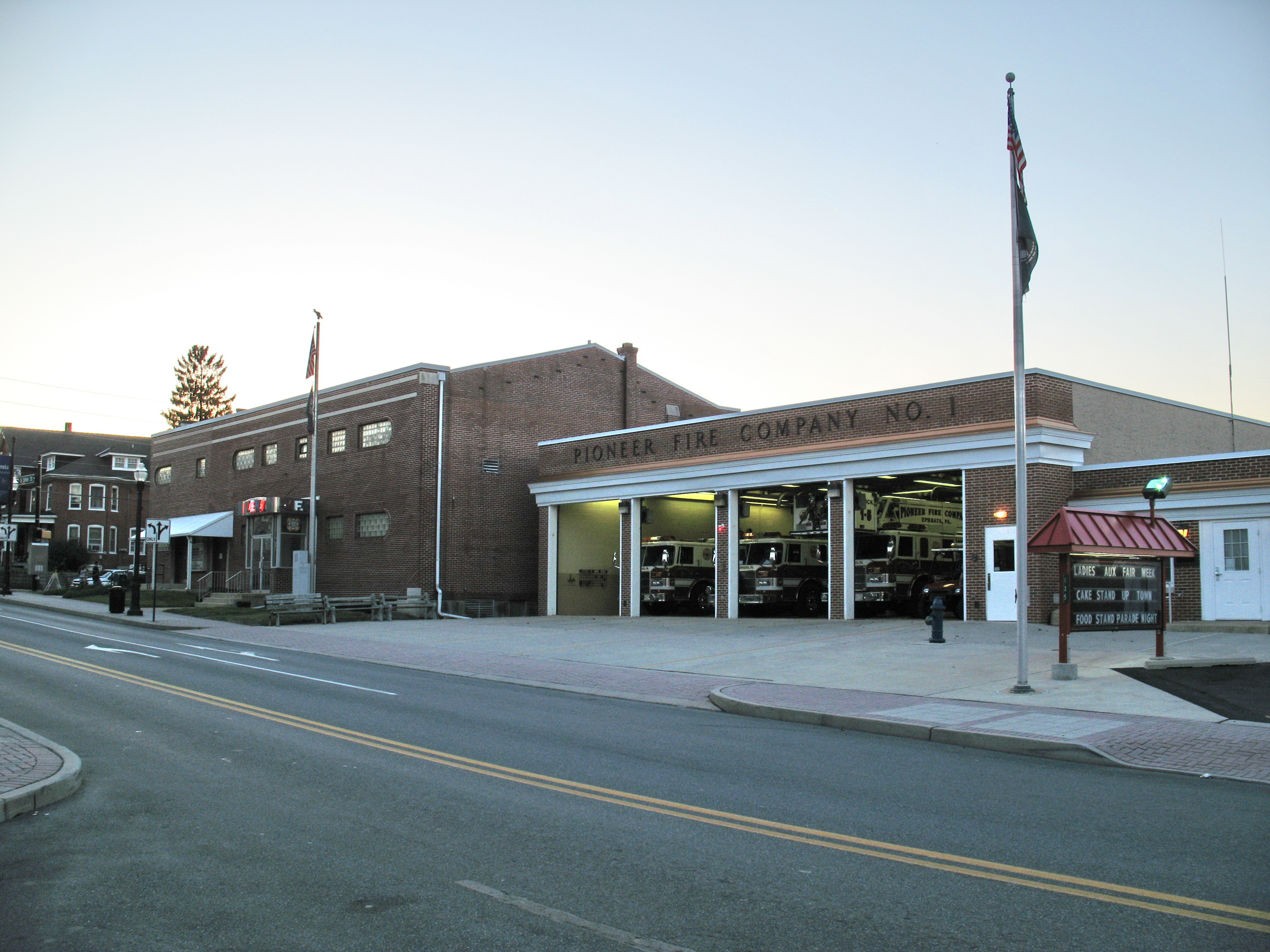
The Pioneer Fire Company and the Veterans of Foreign Wars facility

The Ephrata Public Library, on South Reading Road, is a member of the Library System of Lancaster County.

== Infrastructure ==
=== Transportation ===
The U.S. Route 222 freeway passes 2 miles (3 km) southeast of Ephrata, heading southwest to Lancaster and northeast to Reading and Allentown. US 222 meets the Pennsylvania Turnpike (Interstate 76) at the Reading interchange 6 miles (10 km) northeast of Ephrata. U.S. Route 322 passes northwest–southeast through Ephrata along Main Street, with an interchange at US 222 east of the borough. Said interchange was converted to a diverging diamond interchange in 2021. Pennsylvania Route 272 passes southwest–northeast through Ephrata along Reading Road, heading through the western part of the borough. The Red Rose Transit Authority (RRTA) provides bus service to Ephrata along Route 11, which operates from the Walmart in Ephrata through the downtown area and south to downtown Lancaster. There is a park and ride lot at the now former Kmart in Ephrata that is served by RRTA.

The Reading and Columbia Railroad operated passenger service through downtown Ephrata until 1952. The East Penn Railroad continues to operate freight service from Ephrata north to Reading on the Lancaster Northern line, while the line between Ephrata and Lititz, to the southwest, has been converted into a rail trail.

=== Utilities ===
The Borough of Ephrata Electric Division provides electricity to most of Ephrata, with Allentown-based PPL Corporation providing electricity to part of it. The Borough of Ephrata Electric Division dates back to 1902, when the borough purchased it from the Lancaster Valley Electric Company for $7,000. The borough operated a small generating plant on South State Street before the Ephrata Borough Electric Plant was built on Church Avenue in 1924.

The electric plant operated until 1965, when increased demand for electricity led the borough to purchase power from outside sources. The Borough of Ephrata Electric Division provides 140 million kilowatt-hours of electricity annually and has $18.6 million in sales. The Ephrata Area Joint Authority (EAJA) provides water to Ephrata along with Ephrata Township and Clay Township, serving 8,222 customers. The agency provides 700 million gallons of water annually, with water coming from the Cocalico Creek and groundwater wells. The EAJA operates a filtration treatment plant and has three wells and four storage tanks to store water. Trash and recycling collection in Ephrata is provided by the borough through a contract with Goods Disposal. Natural gas service in Ephrata is provided by UGI Utilities.

=== Health care ===
WellSpan Health operates the WellSpan Ephrata Community Hospital in Ephrata, which serves the borough and surrounding areas in northern Lancaster County. The hospital has 133 acute care beds and eight acute rehabilitation beds and offers an emergency room, a cancer center, and a maternity unit, among other inpatient and outpatient services.

== Law and government ==
Ephrata is a borough. The mayor is Thomas G. Reinhold.

"Ephrata" is also used to refer to the surrounding Ephrata Township.

=== Elected officials representing Ephrata ===
- Pennsylvania Governor Josh Shapiro (D)
- Senior United States Senator John Fetterman (D)
- Junior United States Senator Dave McCormick (R)
- United States Congressman Lloyd Smucker (R)
- Pennsylvania State Senator James Malone (D)
- Pennsylvania State Representative Keith Greiner (R)
- Ephrata Borough Council: Greg Zimmerman (R), President; Vic Richard (R), Vice President; Al Buohl (R), President Pro-Tempore; Tim Barr (R); Kory Musser (R); Nancy Aronson (R); Alan Armstrong (R); Chad Ochs (R)
- Ephrata Mayor: Thomas G. Reinhold (R)

== Notable people ==
- Michael Akers, film director, producer, screenwriter, and editor
- Evelyn Margaret Ay, Miss America 1954
- Guy K. Bard, educator and judge, Attorney General of Pennsylvania (1938–1939), first person from Lancaster County to be appointed a U.S. federal judge
- Jacob Hibshman, U.S. Congressman for Pennsylvania's 3rd congressional district from 1819 to 1821
- Travis Jankowski, professional baseball player and coach
- Charles B. McVay III, rear admiral and commanding officer, USS Indianapolis (CA-35) at the time of its sinking in 1945
- Mike Mentzer, professional bodybuilder and 1979 Mr. Olympia heavyweight champion
- Ray Mentzer, professional bodybuilder and 1979 AAU Mr. America
- Miles Rock (1840-1901), civil engineer, geologist and astronomer
- Stanley "Whitey" von Nieda, NBA basketball player
- Murray Merle Schwartz, United States District Court judge
- Texas in July, metalcore band
- Richard Winters, Major in "E Company", 2nd Battalion, 506th Parachute Infantry Regiment, 101st Airborne Division

== Sites of interest ==
=== Museums and historic sites ===
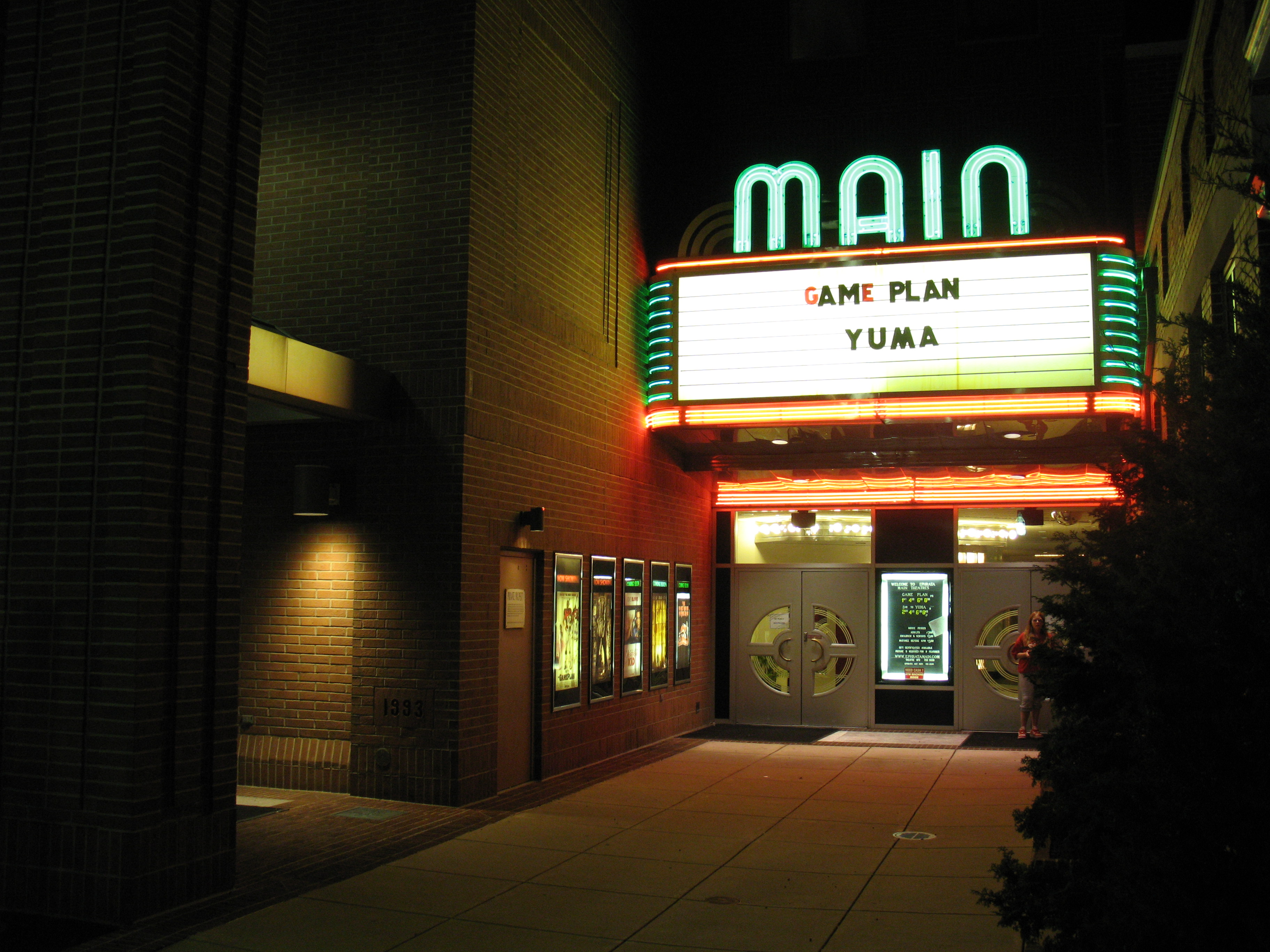
The Ephrata Main Theater

- Eicher Arts Center, occupies Conrad Beissel's historic Eicher House. It also contains an Indian (Native American) museum and shop.
- Ephrata Cloister
- Main Theater, the Main Theater, built by the Stiefel brothers, held its grand opening Christmas Day in 1938. The first film to show was Just Around the Corner starring Shirley Temple. In 1990, the Denver and Ephrata Telephone Company purchased the theater to restore the building and once again provide movies and live productions to the area, with many original fixtures incorporated into the renovated venue. The theater reopened November 12, 1993.
- Mountain Springs Hotel, the site of the former hotel stands at the corner of Main Street (U.S. Route 322) and Spring Garden Street. Unoccupied for a long period of time, it was torn down in 2004, except for a small portion of the original building, which was preserved and renovated to be used as a conference center and, possibly, as a museum.
- Ephrata Performing Arts Center, the Ephrata Performing Arts Center (EPAC) started as the Legion Star Playhouse in 1953 under the direction of John Cameron. In 1972, following Cameron's departure, volunteers took over the production of regular shows and eventually incorporated as a non-profit in 1979; the first season under the name of EPAC came in 1980. Following a $2.4 million renovation, the community theater was able to and still produces year-round theater, including plays, musicals, a children's series, regular educational opportunities, including a summer theater camp, and special performances.
- Ephrata National Bank, Ephrata National Bank (ENB) is an FDIC-insured community bank headquartered in Ephrata, PA. ENB was founded in 1881 with the backing of 73 investors contributing $100 each. The bank is headquartered in a historic building on Main Street in Ephrata, which was designed by Lancaster architect C. Emlen Urban and completed in 1925. The building's Beaux-Arts structure is noted for its marble detailing, walnut interior trim, and 26-ton vault door. On its centennial anniversary in 1981, ENB added an annex connecting its original 1925 bank building with an addition that had been completed in 1960. A 2011 restoration focused on keeping the building up to date while reviving the "feel" of its original style.

=== Area attractions ===
- Ephrata Fair, the largest street fair in Pennsylvania. The fair dates back to October 1919, when local businessmen organized a one-day festivity to commemorate World War I veterans. Over the following years, the fair grew to include farmers celebrating the harvest; and it also grew in duration by several days. The popular parade was added in 1932. The fair is presently held for five days each September and attracts tens of thousands of visitors.

== Sister city ==
Ephrata has one sister city, as designated by Sister Cities International:

- Eberbach, Baden-Württemberg, Germany

== Tornado ==
On March 29, 2009, a strong storm briefly swept through Ephrata. On March 31, the National Weather Service confirmed that it was an EF1 tornado. Strong hail came with it. Although there were no fatalities, 30 homes were damaged and eight mobile homes destroyed. Many vehicles could be seen on their side afterwards, and holes were put in houses from the hail.
