= Red Caboose Motel =

Train car motel in Lancaster County, Pennsylvania, U.S.

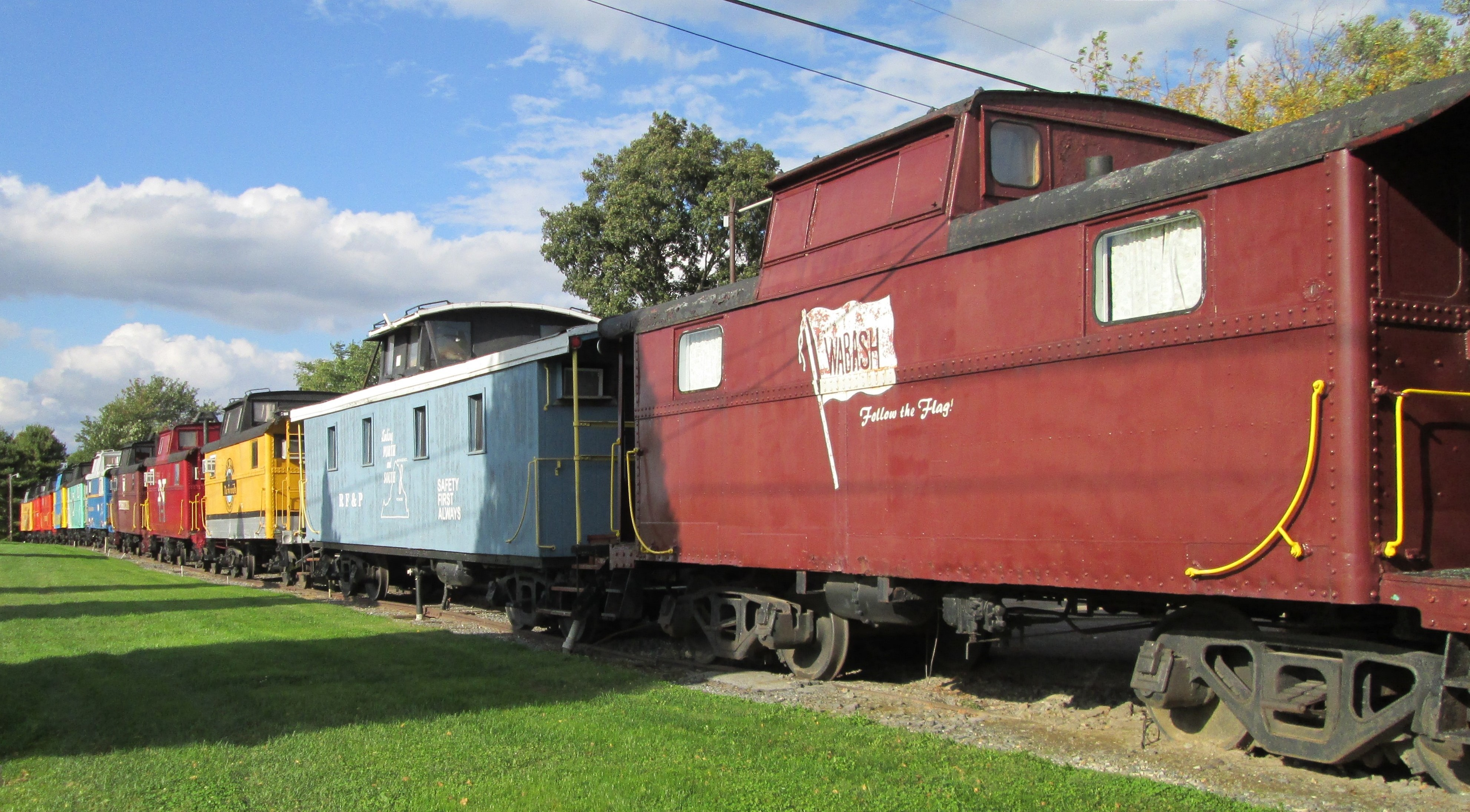
- Cabooses in 2014 painted individually to represent different railroads

- Location in Pennsylvania Location in the United States

General information
- Location: Ronks, Lancaster County, Pennsylvania, 312 Paradise Lane
- Coordinates: 39.9855°N 76.1516°W
- Opening: May 10, 1970

Technical details
- Floor count: 1

Design and construction
- Developer: Donald M. Denlinger

Other information
- Number of rooms: 48 rooms/38 cabooses
- Number of restaurants: 1

Website
- redcaboosemotel.com

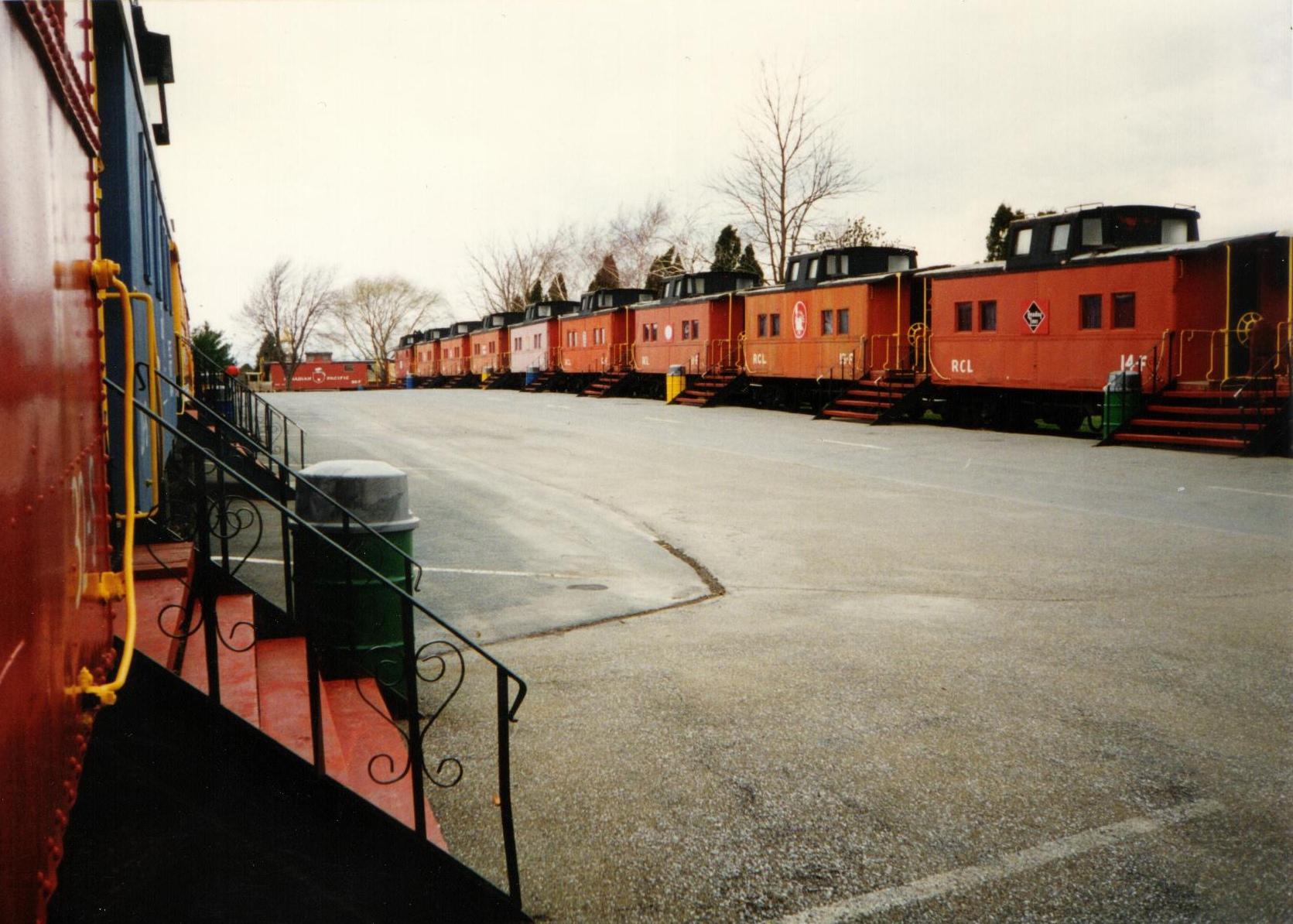
The motel in 1996 when the cabooses were still red

The Red Caboose Motel (originally named the Red Caboose Lodge) is a 48-room train motel in the Amish country near Ronks, in Lancaster County, Pennsylvania, where guests stay in railroad cabooses. The motel consists of over three dozen cabooses and other railroad cars, such as dining cars that serve as a restaurant. It was developed and opened in 1970 by Donald M. Denlinger, who started with 19 surplus cabooses purchased at auction from the Penn Central Railroad. The expanded and renovated property has also hosted railroad-themed events and concerts and dances in its barn.

The motel is in an area with other railroad attractions including the Railroad Museum of Pennsylvania and the National Toy Train Museum. The ticket counter of the Strasburg Rail Road, an almost two-hundred-year-old heritage railway, is 0.25 miles (0.40 km) away, and its tracks run past the motel. The motel has been described as a landmark and roadside attraction. It was listed in Guinness World Records for having the largest collection of privately owned cabooses in the world in 1984. The cabooses were initially painted a traditional railroad shade of red, hence the name, but were later changed so that each car displayed the livery of a different North American railroad.

== Origin ==
The creation of the Red Caboose Motel began with the incorporation of "Red Caboose Lodge, Inc." (Note: Originally called the "Red Caboose Lodge", it was later operated as the "Red Caboose Motel"; newspaper articles start using that name from c. 1972) by Donald M. Denlinger on January 9, 1967. Denlinger, who has been called a "tourism industry legend", also developed the Mill Bridge Village camping resort, the Fulton Steamboat Inn and the Historic Strasburg Inn.

In the summer of 1969, Denlinger bid on 19 cabooses which the Penn Central Railroad was auctioning as surplus from its rolling stock "graveyard" in Altoona. He placed a bid of $700 each, $100 below scrap value, on the 950,000-pound (430,000 kg) lot of cabooses, which was accepted by the railroad. He also purchased a dining car. Accounts vary as to the circumstances of his purchase. In an interview the following year, Denlinger recounted to a reporter that he had seen a caboose being used as a tourist information center while he was on vacation in 1969. In a conversation a week later, he mentioned this to his childhood friend Walter Frey, a Penn Central employee, who informed him of the impending auction. According to "Red Caboose Lodge", an account of the motel's history published and sold by the motel, an (unnamed) school friend visiting Mill Bridge Village and meeting Denlinger again dared him to bid on the lot of cabooses.

On January 4, 1969, a Penn Central official called Denlinger to tell him that nine of his cabooses were on a siding at Leaman Place, Pennsylvania and needed to be removed that day to escape demurrage charges. This came as a surprise to Denlinger; in his 1970 interview, he reported that he had expected delivery in mid-February. (He had made arrangements with Penn Central to store the remainder of the cabooses and the dining car for an additional year.) By contrast, "Red Caboose Lodge" recounts that Denlinger had forgotten about his bid and the phone call was his first notice that he had successfully acquired the cabooses. After a hasty search during a blizzard, Denlinger found an unused siding for a feed mill at Gordonville, Pennsylvania, about a mile west of Leaman Place, and arranged to accommodate the cabooses there.

Prior to January 1970, Denlinger searched for a property large enough to accommodate the cabooses that was also adjacent to a railroad. Many suitable properties were owned by Amish people who would not lease land to a commercial operation such as a motel because of their religious beliefs. He eventually found a 43-acre (17 ha) non-Amish-owned farm listed for sale in Ronks, 8 mi (13 km) east of Lancaster and about 60 mi (97 km) west of Philadelphia, along the Strasburg Rail Road. He leased the farm for one year with an option to buy.

Denlinger needed financing for the project and contacted a Lancaster bank. A loan officer was intrigued by his story of acquiring the cabooses and his plans to renovate them for use as motel rooms. Before being approved, he would repeat the story to the bank's commercial loan officer and again to the president. Ultimately, they believed the project had merit and provided a $185,000 loan.

Work on the motel began in January 1970 with the laying of 800 ft (240 m) of track on which the cars would sit. The Strasburg Rail Road consented to a temporary connection to their track to facilitate delivery. Installation of utilities and other infrastructure also commenced. On February 27, 1970, the first ten cabooses made their final journey from the Leaman Place junction in Paradise, Pennsylvania, where the Penn Central connected with the Strasburg tracks, to their new home in Ronks, powered by Strasburg Rail Road's vintage Steam Locomotive #31. The engine successfully backed seven cabooses over the curved track of the temporary junction into the motel site but the much longer coach derailed. With no crane available, house jacks were eventually used to rerail the car and the steam engine, having been refilled with water from a fire department tanker, pushed the train farther before the coach derailed again. This time, the car was clear of the Strasburg mainline and the Philadelphia track crew, unable to stay onsite longer, restored the track so the engine could return to its yard. It took the three remaining cabooses with it for later delivery. The cabooses were made ready for accommodating guests with a planned opening by Mother's Day (May 10, 1970).

== Design and operation ==
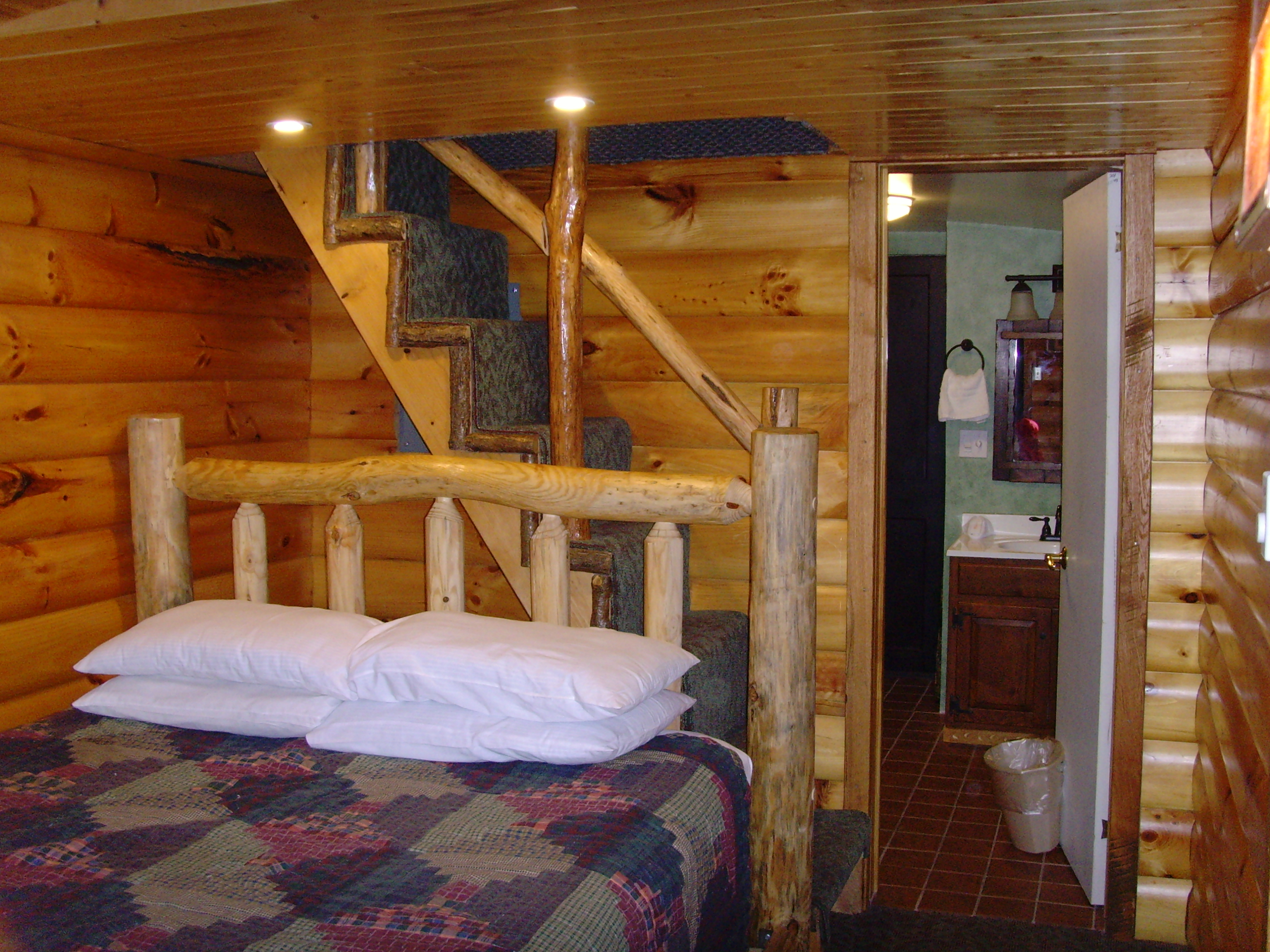
Interior

The motel complex consists of 38 cabooses, a railway post office car, baggage car, farmhouse, barn and two dining cars that serve as a restaurant, separated by a boxcar that serves as the kitchen. The cars are parked on actual railroad track. Rather than one linear track, there are multiple shorter tracks to keep the motel layout more compact. The cars are immovable, having been welded to the tracks.

The interiors received insulation over the one-quarter-inch thick steel walls. Initial configurations included a plan with two double beds to sleep four people, and one that slept six in one double bed and four bunk beds. The caboose's cupola was hidden on the inside by the ceiling, but the space was used to house an air conditioner. Electric heaters were also installed, along with a bathroom with shower in the center of each caboose.

Denlinger's original caboose interiors were particularly memorable. Each caboose was equipped with a non-functioning potbelly stove that had a black & white television inside and a lamp hanging from the articulated stovepipe overhead. The cabooses each have a central bathroom but are otherwise unique with different wall finishes. Small furniture that would fit into the cars had to be found or custom made, with some pieces made by a Pennsylvania Dutch cabinetmaker including a combination desk / storage bench with hand-painted American eagle on the top. Denlinger and the renovation contractors did not realize that the cabooses had three-inch-thick concrete floors to lower their center of gravity, necessary when moving at high speed. This made drilling holes in the floor much more difficult than expected.

There are nine different floor plans (seven more than the two originals); some have four or six bunk beds and one caboose is designated the "honeymoon suite" and is equipped with a Jacuzzi.

The exteriors of each caboose were painted bright red, once a traditional caboose color, in 1970, corresponding to the motel's name. They were later uniquely repainted in the livery of a different classic American or Canadian railroad.

On opening day in May 1970, 4,500 people came to see the motel, then made up of ten cabooses and one dining car serving breakfast only. So many people just wanted to see inside a room that in 1972, Denlinger added one caboose for viewing that had been toured by 81,000 people by November 1973.

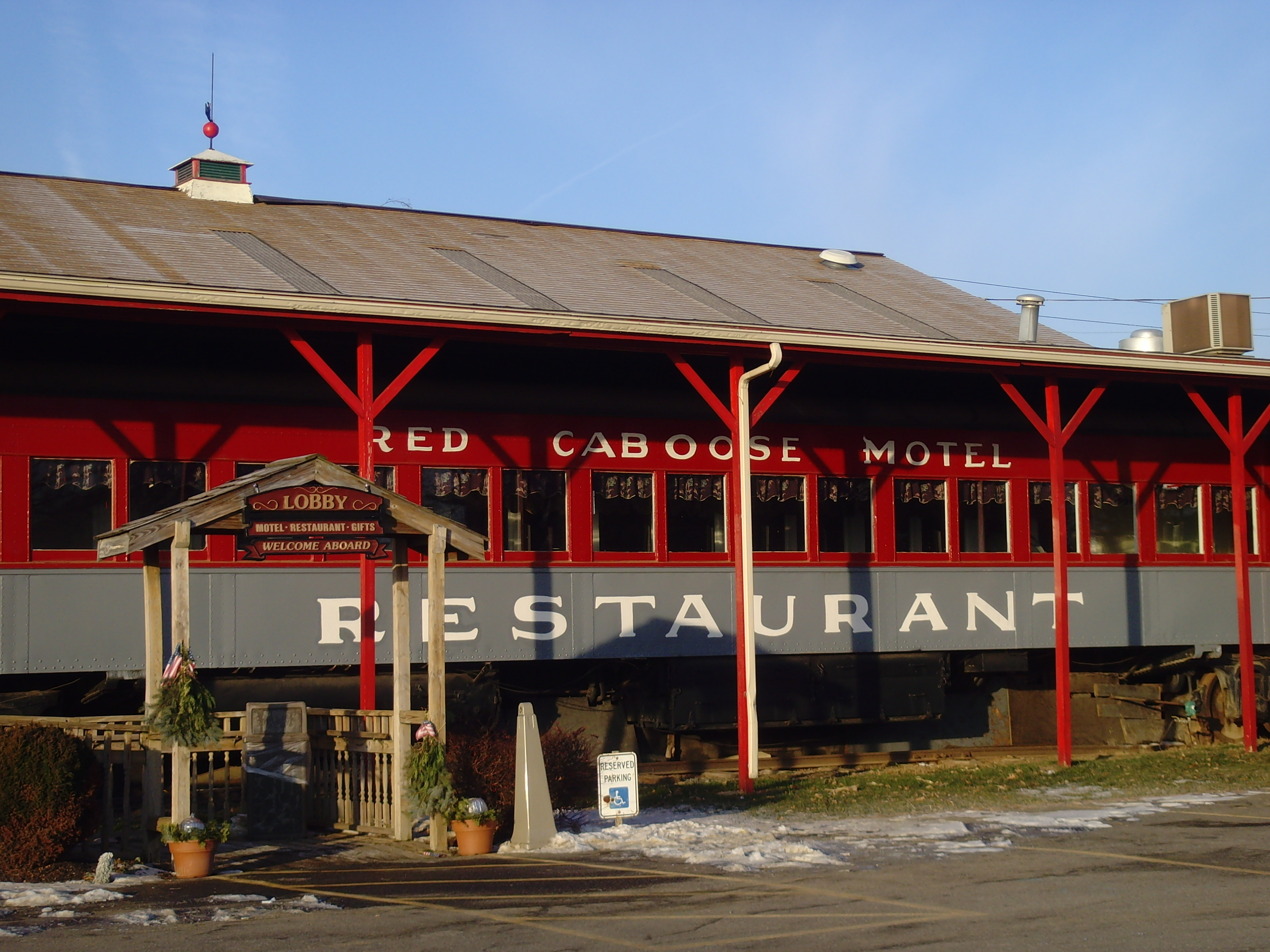
Restaurant

Two Pennsylvania Railroad 1920s P-70 railroad coaches, that had operated on the railroad's Reading Seashore Line subsidiary, were acquired from Penn Central's yard in Hollidaysburg, Pennsylvania, and brought to the property for use as a dining car restaurant. The restaurant, originally called the Red Caboose Depot Restaurant, opened in June 1974 with a dedication speech by state senator Richard A. Snyder. Each car sat approximately 120 people and was equipped with a mechanism to gently rock the cars to simulate motion.

By 1973, Denlinger reported that the cabooses were booked three weeks in advance during the busy summer season.

A railroad post office car and baggage car and 19 additional cabooses were added in the 1980s. The farm's original house is also used for additional lodging rooms. One expansion occurred after the town granted permission to add eight cabooses in 1984, which Denlinger said would cost $3,000 each and require up to $15,000 to remodel.

Over the years the Red Caboose Motel has been the home to many events including railroadiana auctions, including one in 1979 when a Reading Railroad caboose was sold, and weekly performances in the barn. On May 10, 1980, to commemorate the 150th anniversary of the legendary Great Train Race, a reenactment was held between Strasburg Rail Road Steam Locomotive #90 and a historic stagecoach purchased by Denlinger for the event drawn by four horses.

As of 2018, a miniature train ride, petting zoo, and free movies shown in the barn were available to guests. The restaurant (now Casey Jones’ Restaurant, named after Casey Jones, a notable locomotive engineer) serves the traditional American food that would have been found on trains in the twentieth century as well as local Lancaster County food. Diners can view passing steam trains on the nearby Strasburg Rail Road, the oldest continuously operating railroad in the western hemisphere. The motel and restaurant are closed yearly in January and February.

== Museum ==
In 1972, Denlinger added a Pullman coach as a museum for railroad memorabilia called The Age of Steam Museum. He purchased many items from a collector in Texas, and combined with his existing collection it may have been the largest privately owned collection of steam-age railroad items. The museum displayed 170 steam whistles ranging in size from four inches (100 mm) to nearly six feet (1.8 m) and weighing up to 375 lb (170 kg). There were also railroad bells, the largest weighing 300 lb (140 kg). The collection included railroad crossing markers and other signs, heralds (logos), semaphore signals and engine plates. There was also a mock station master's office.

== Post-Denlinger era ==
Denlinger, who died in 2008, retired from the operation after 22 years in February 1993 when it was sold for $1.3 million to Kevin and Susan Cavanaugh and partner Peter Botta.

In August 2001, the owners were Wayne Jackson and Scott Fix, according to a report about a potential sewer violation lodged by the town of Paradise. The motel was forced to close for several months in the summer of 2002 by the Pennsylvania Department of Environmental Protection because of high nitrate levels in the motel's well water and related leaks in the septic system. It was fined at least $12,000. The motel was ordered to close again in October when nitrate levels were still double the amount allowed by state and federal standards, despite the addition of a nitrate treatment plant. Pennsylvania attorney general Jerry Pappert sued for restitution of booking reservation deposits not returned after the closure. The owners were ordered to pay $9,000 in restitution and $7,000 in fines and fees.

Jackson and Fix sold the property in 2003. One report says it was purchased by Dan and Judy Mowery in April of that year, while another says the Mowerys purchased only the restaurant in September 2003. By December, the motel was in Chapter 7 bankruptcy. The owner in July 2004 was reported to be Farmer's First Bank which had foreclosed on the mortgage leading to the bankruptcy filing. The property was then under the management of a court-appointed receiver. The bank tried to dispose of the property in a sheriff's sale in the fall of 2004 but no one was will to pay at least the amount owed on the mortgage, so the bank retained the property.

Larry DeMarco of Philadelphia emerged as a potential buyer in the spring of 2005. He closed on the property on April 15. DeMarco expected to spend $2 million to purchase the property, repair the septic system, and remodel the complex. He had built up forty rental properties in Northeast Philadelphia and sold about ten of them to pay for the purchase. DeMarco had consulted with Denlinger, the original owner. DeMarco upgraded many of the rooms as well as the kitchen and reopened in 2005. Without a permanent fix to the septic system, DeMarco was forced to use a temporary holding tank that had to be pumped out daily. Many years went by with various solutions proposed and rejected until an on-site treatment plant was constructed at the end of the decade. (Note: DeMarco proposed fixing the septic system jointly with the neighboring Toy Train Museum that had a similar problem. Town officials applied for state funding in 2005 to construct a sewage treatment plant for the two properties that the town would own and charge the motel and museum for operating costs. The state funding was available under the 2004 Water Supply and Wastewater Infrastructure Program (PennWorks) created by the state to foster economic development. The grant was denied. A plan to extend a sewer line from a plant in another jurisdiction was also considered.)

DeMarco sold the property in 2016 for $1.7 million. The new owners were a partnership of Todd and Debra Prickett, their son Tyler and his wife Katherine. None of them had previously been in the hospitality industry but Todd and Debra had taken Tyler and his siblings to the motel numerous times starting in 1987. They had the assistance of a U.S. Small Business Administration loan of $577,000 and immediately began an estimated $75,000 renovation.

== Media coverage ==
The motel was called "world famous" in a 2005 book on American culture, noting that the motel has been featured in National Geographic, Reader's Digest, Ripley's Believe It or Not!, and the Chinese Life magazine and said its popularity "made it a destination for tourists from throughout the world as well as a landmark on the American road".

It was listed in Guinness World Records for having the largest collection of privately owned cabooses in the world in 1984.

== Gallery ==
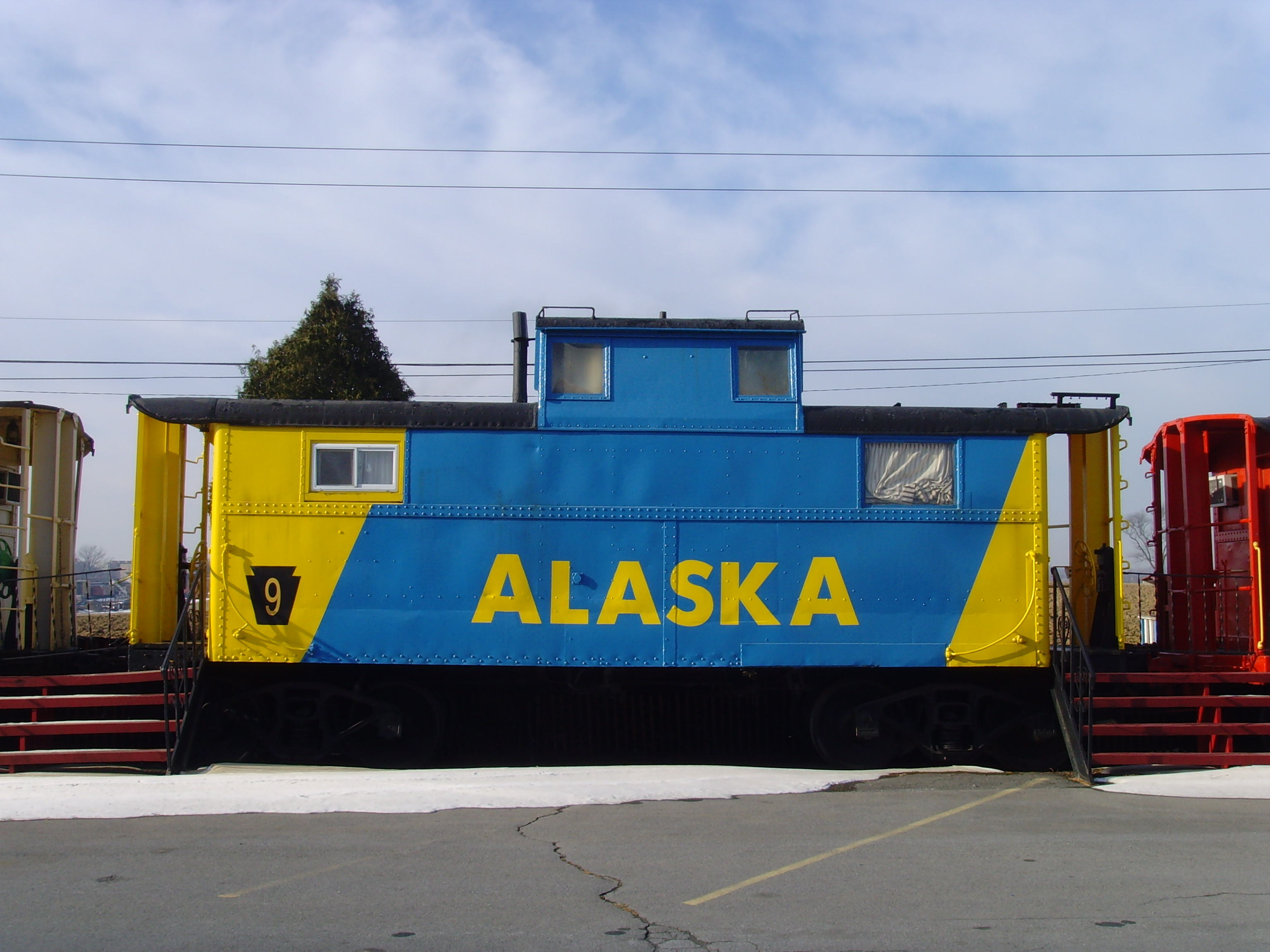
Alaska Railroad

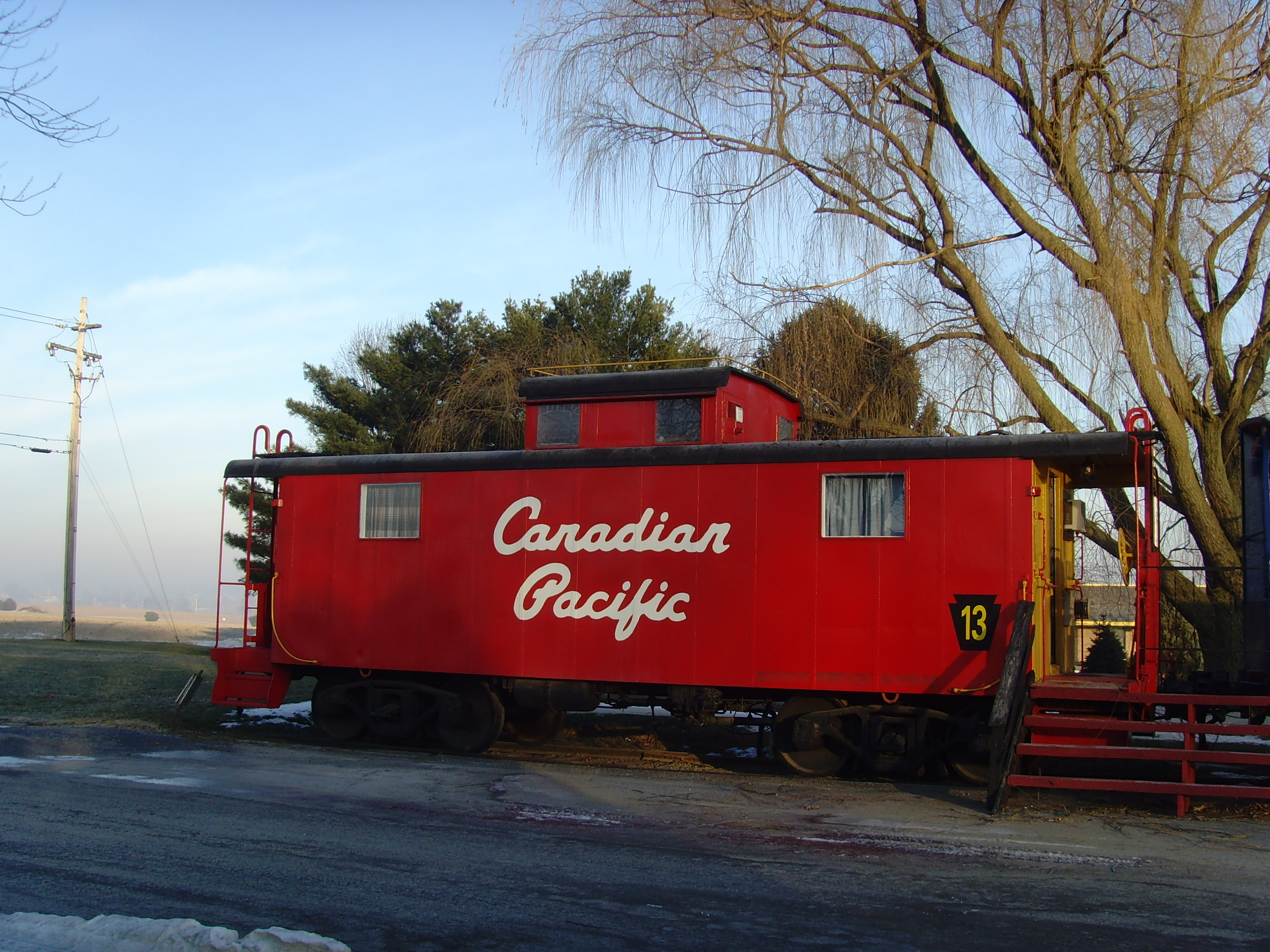
Canadian Pacific

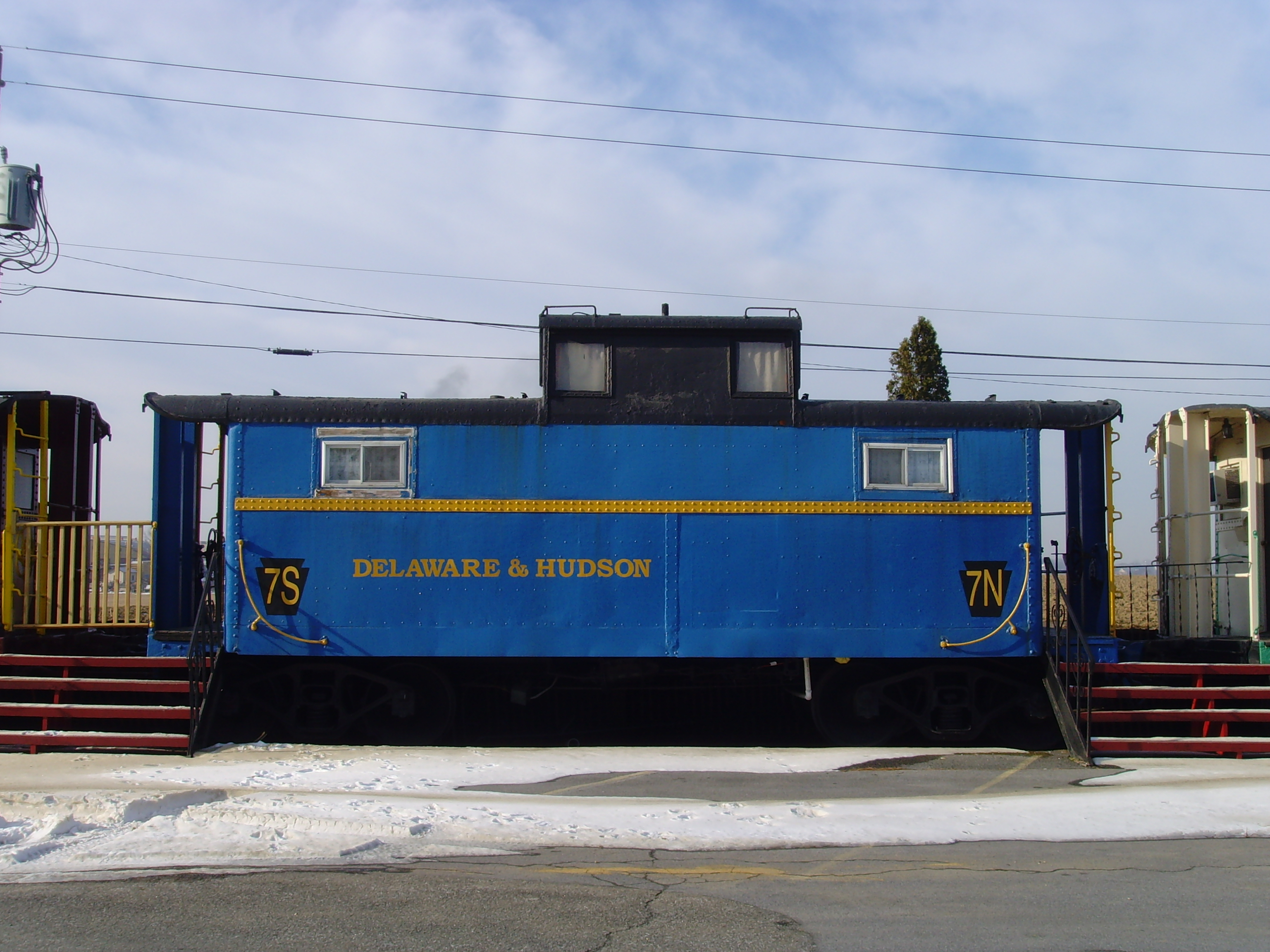
Delaware & Hudson

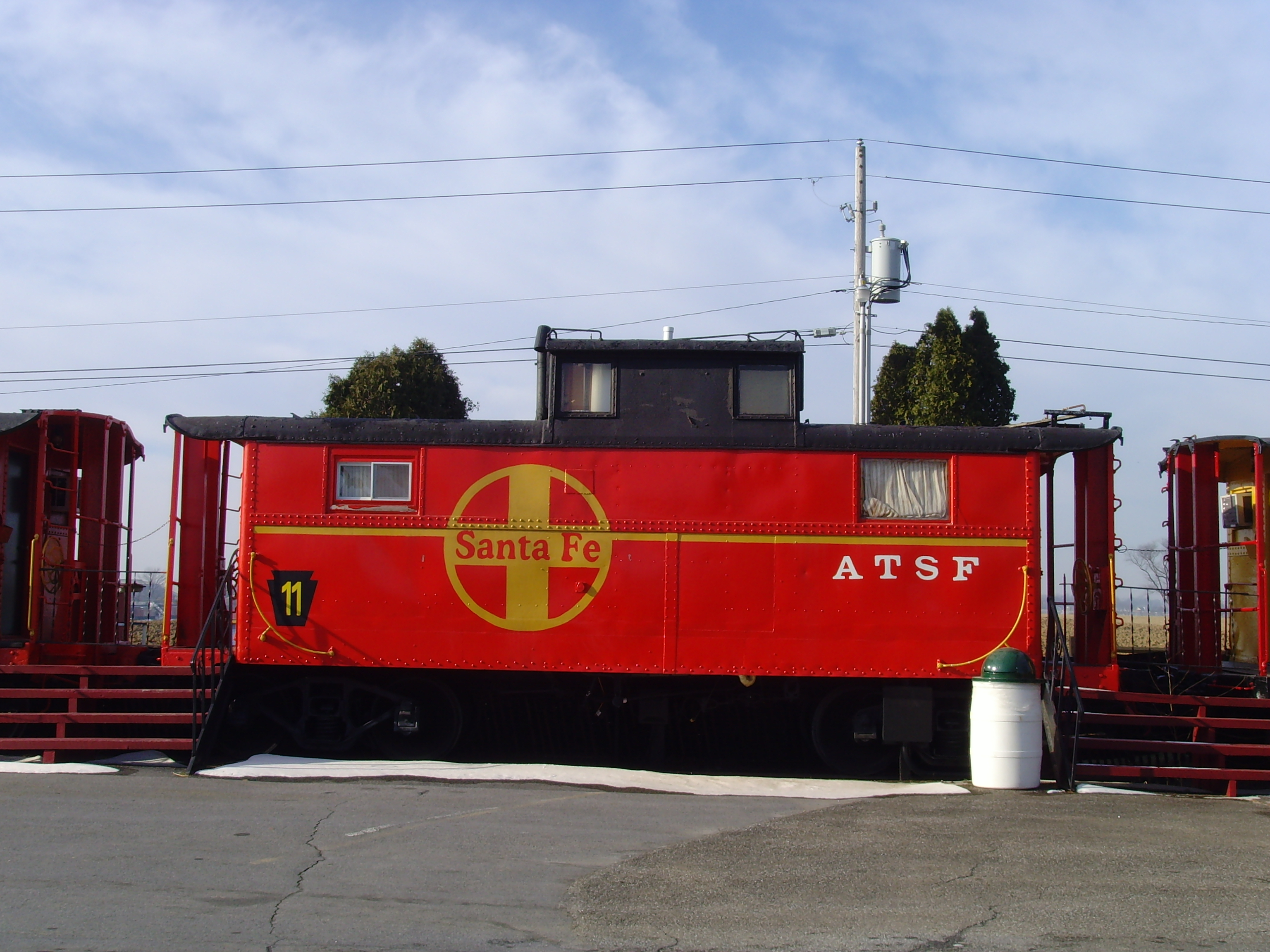
Santa Fe

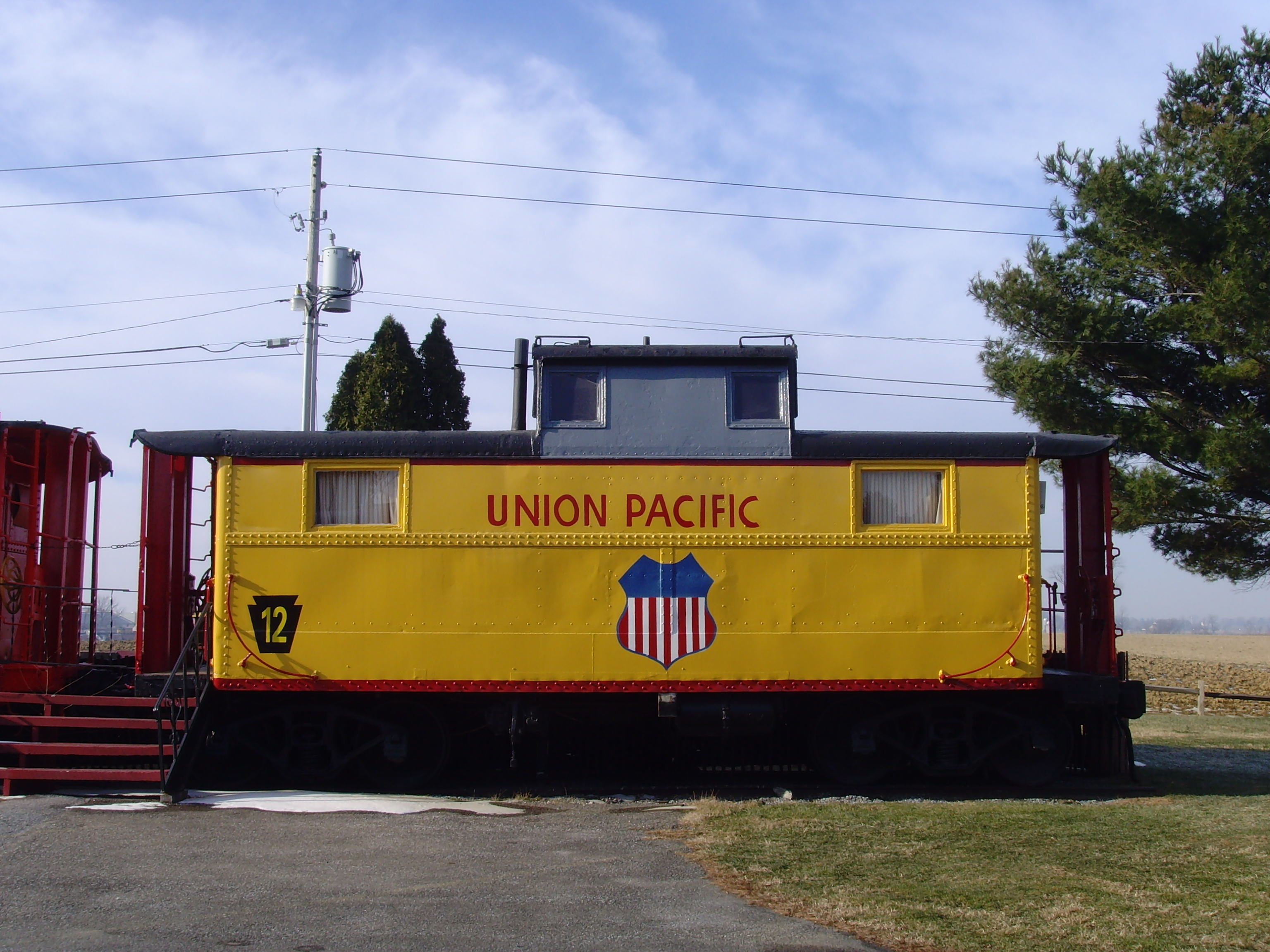
Union Pacific

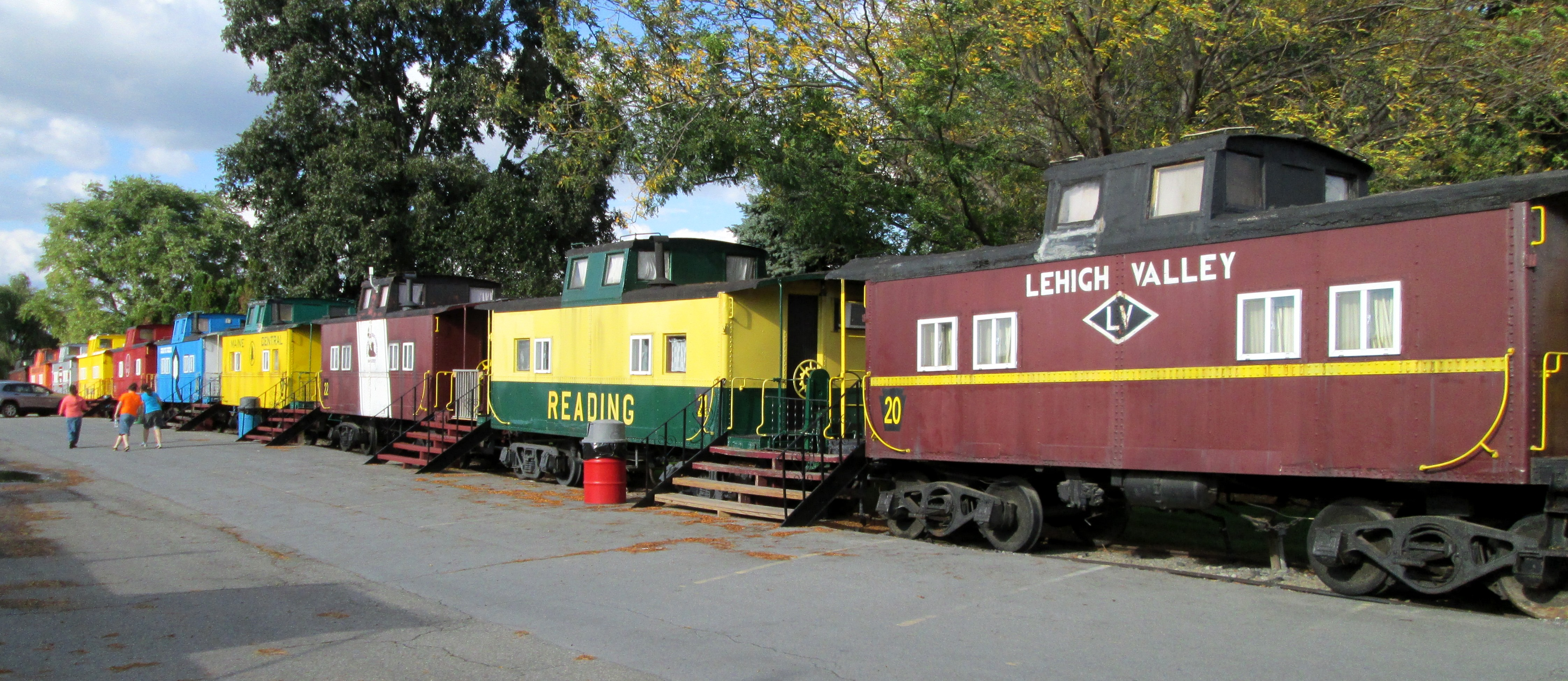
Lodging unit

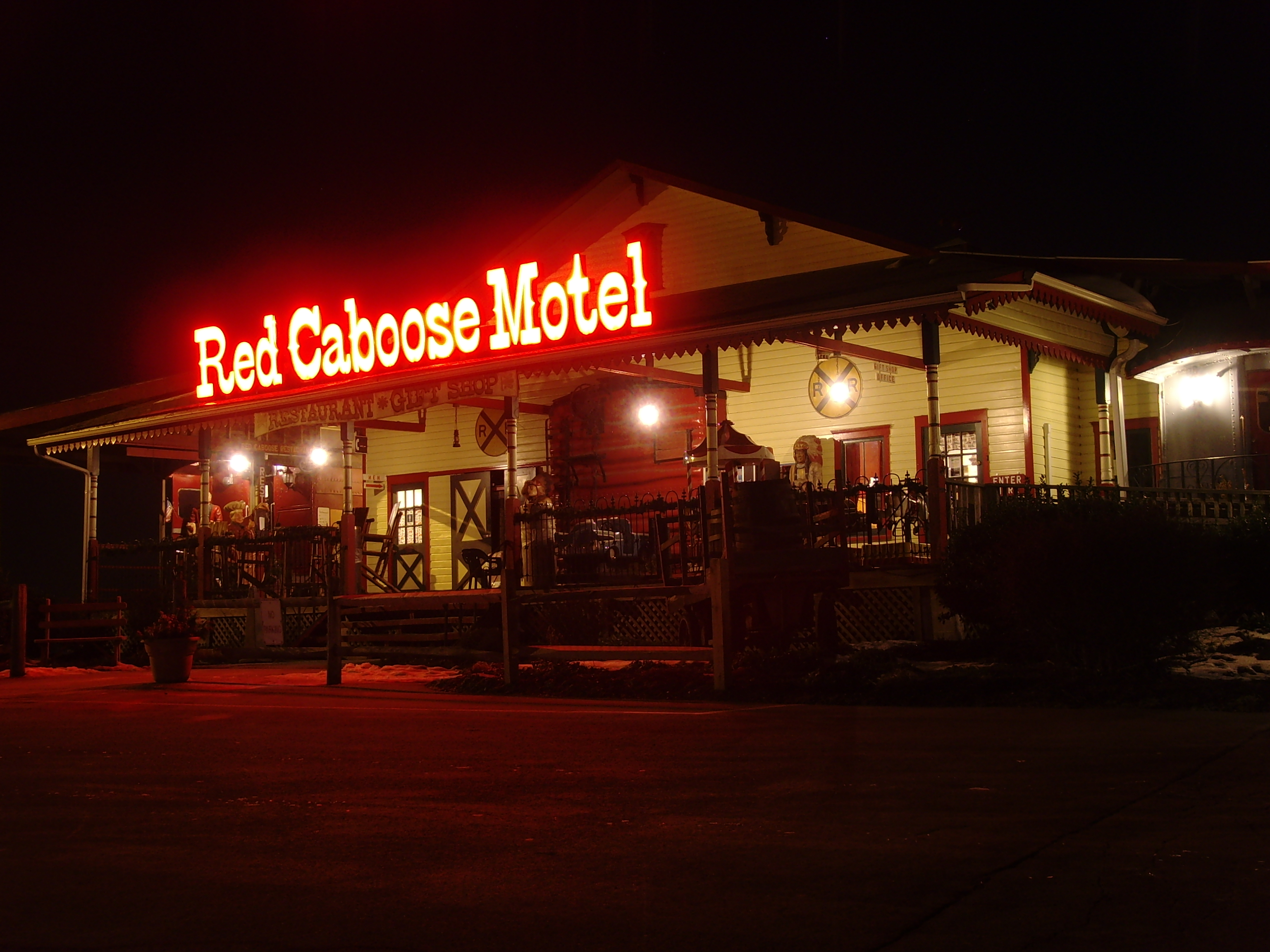
Farmhouse

== See also ==
- Antlers Hotel (Kingsland, Texas), a railroad-themed hotel with three cabooses used as guest rooms
