= Ronks, Pennsylvania =

Unincorporated community in Pennsylvania, US

- Census-designated place
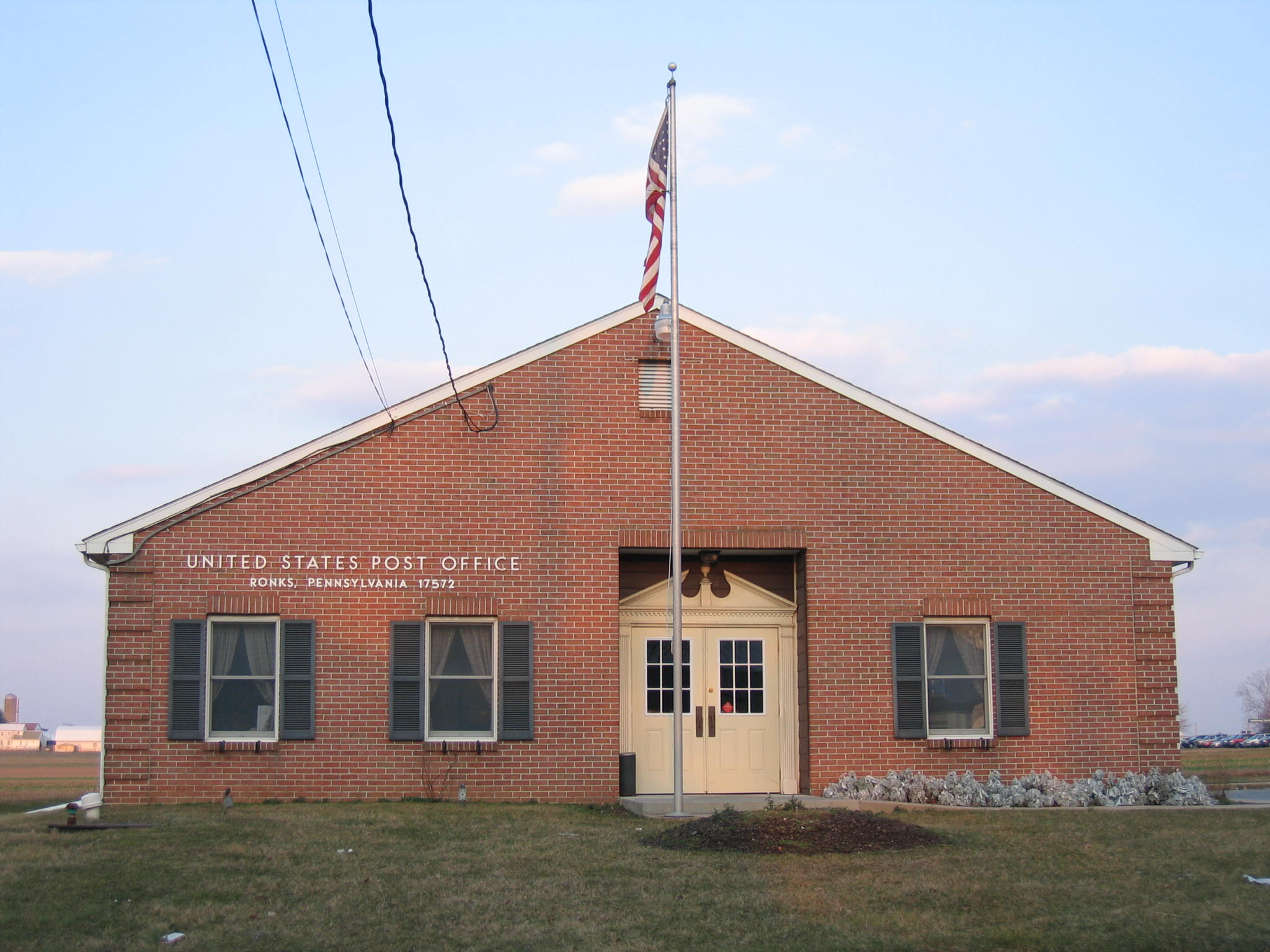
- Ronks post office

- Location in Pennsylvania Location in the United States
- Coordinates: 40°01′34″N 76°10′07″W
- Country: United States
- State: Pennsylvania
- County: Lancaster
- Township: East Lampeter

Area
  - Total: 0.68 sq mi (1.75 km^{2})
  - Land: 0.67 sq mi (1.74 km^{2})
  - Water: 0 sq mi (0.00 km^{2})
- Elevation: 380 ft (120 m)

Population (2020)
  - Total: 391
  - Density: 580.4/sq mi (224.11/km^{2})
- Time zone: UTC-5 (Eastern (EST))
  - Summer (DST): UTC-4 (EDT)
- ZIP code: 17572
- Area code: 717
- FIPS code: 42-65984
- GNIS feature ID: 1185421

Ronks is a small unincorporated farming community and census-designated place (CDP) in East Lampeter Township, Lancaster County, Pennsylvania, United States, just west of Paradise. As of the 2010 census the population was 362.

The community is the home of Ronks Concrete Company and has a large Amish and Mennonite population. The Ronks ZIP code of 17572 covers a much larger area than the CDP, extending south into Strasburg Township and east into Leacock Township. Within this larger area are several Amish-themed tourist attractions, shops, restaurants, and lodging.

== Geography ==
Ronks is in east-central Lancaster County, in the eastern part of East Lampeter Township. It is bordered to the north by Bird-in-Hand and to the southeast by Soudersburg. U.S. Route 30, the Lincoln Highway, forms the southern edge of the community, with the center of Ronks 0.7 miles (1.1 km) to the north along Ronks Road. Lancaster, the county seat, is 8 miles (13 km) to the west.

According to the U.S. Census Bureau, the Ronks CDP has a total area of 0.66 square miles (1.7 km^{2}), of which 0.1 acres (424 m^{2}), or 0.02%, are water. Ronks drains west toward Mill Creek and is part of the Conestoga River watershed.

== Demographics ==
Historical population
Census	Pop.	Note	%±
2020	391		—
U.S. Decennial Census
