= Mud Sales =

Seasonal auction in Lancaster County, Pennsylvania

A 2026 Mud Sale at the Gordonville Fire Company in Gordonville, Pennsylvania

Mud Sales are Amish country auction events that occurs on weekends roughly between March to August. Established during the 1960s, it funds roughly 1/3 of volunteer fire departments' annual budget in Lancaster County, Pennsylvania. The term "mud sale" comes from the muddy conditions of the ground while it thaws during early spring, which when the auction occurs. As of 2014, a total of 15 firehouses in the Lancaster host 1 to 2 mud sales yearly for a total of approximately 20 auctions across each annual season.

Alongside the auctions are concessions. Items sold at the auction include quilts, toys, furniture, buggies, handcrafts, and houseware. According to Tom Barnes of the Pittsburgh Post-Gazette, 6,000 pretzels were sold at the 2012 mud sales. According to Gary Clothier of Ask Mr. Know-It-All, as of 2011, the event can draw over 20,000 people annually.
