= Blue Ball, Pennsylvania =

Unincorporated community in Pennsylvania, US

Blue Ball
- Census-designated place
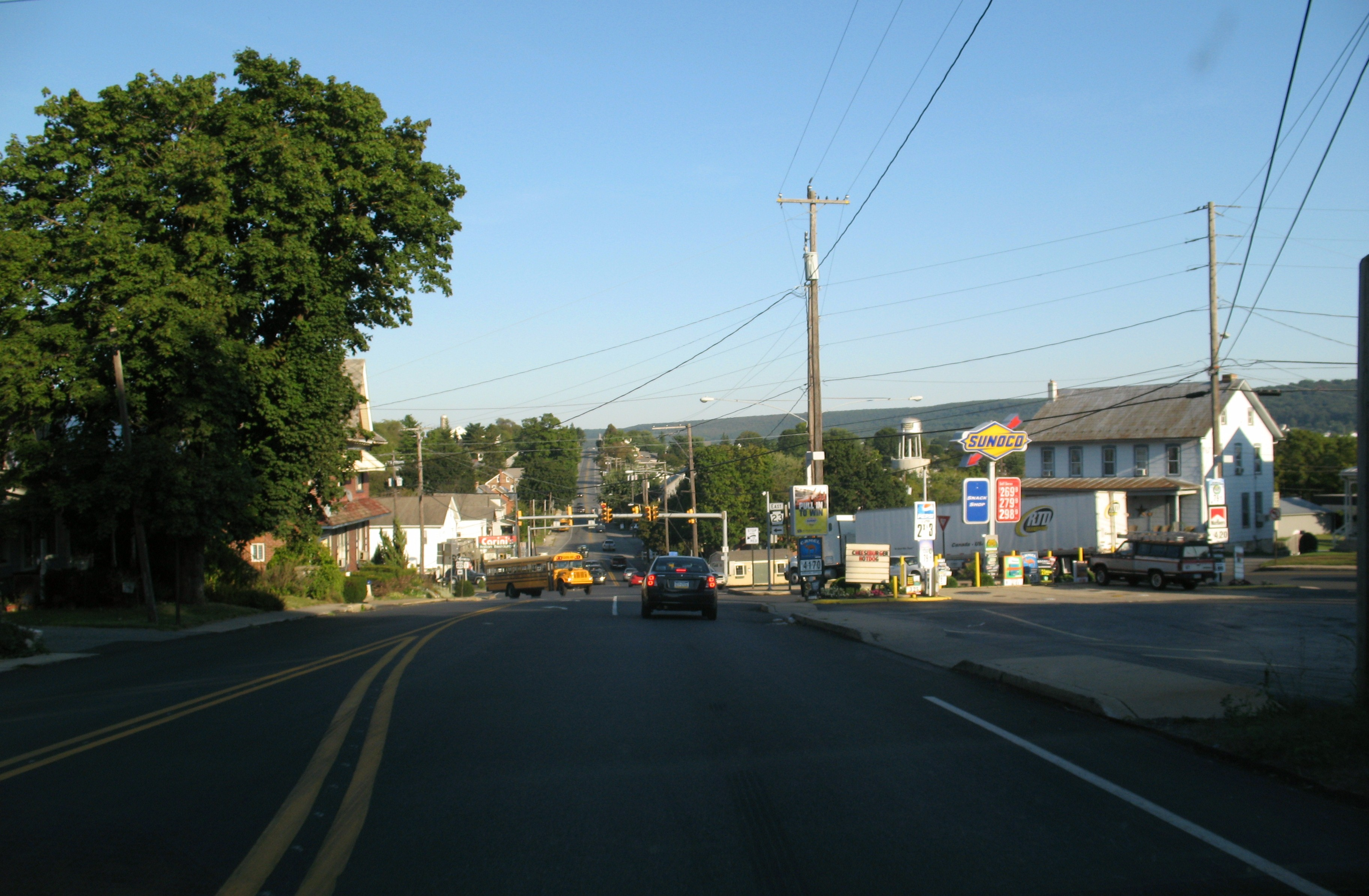
- Along US 322 approaching PA 23

- Location in Pennsylvania Location in the United States
- Coordinates: 40°07′07″N 76°02′50″W
- Country: United States
- State: Pennsylvania
- County: Lancaster
- Township: East Earl

Area
  - Total: 1.20 sq mi (3.10 km^{2})
  - Land: 1.19 sq mi (3.09 km^{2})
  - Water: 0 sq mi (0.00 km^{2})
- Elevation: 441 ft (134 m)

Population (2020)
  - Total: 1,084
  - Density: 907.8/sq mi (350.52/km^{2})
- Time zone: UTC-5 (Eastern (EST))
  - Summer (DST): UTC-4 (EDT)
- ZIP code: 17506
- Area code: 717
- FIPS code: 42-07208
- GNIS feature ID: 1169864

Blue Ball is an unincorporated community and census-designated place (CDP) in East Earl Township, Lancaster County, Pennsylvania, United States. Blue Ball lies approximately 2 miles (3 km) east-northeast of the borough of New Holland at the intersection of US 322 and PA Route 23. As of the 2020 census, the population was 1,095.

== Etymology ==
The name originates from the Blue Ball Hotel, built more than two hundred years ago, which stood on the southeastern corner of the PA 23-US 322 crossroads. The inn was torn down in 1997. In the early 18th century, John Wallace built a small building in Earl Town at the intersection of two trails created by native Americans, French Creek Path (Route 23) and Paxtang (Route 322). He hung a blue ball out front from a post and called it "The Sign of the Blue Ball". Locals soon began calling the town "Blue Ball" after the inn. In 1833, Earl Town officially changed its name to Blue Ball. During Prohibition, the inn changed its name to Blue Ball Hotel.

== Name ==
The town's name has a suggestive second meaning, evoking the slang term "blue balls" (1916), which refers to the sexual condition of temporary testicular and prostate fluid congestion due to prolonged and unsatisfied sexual excitement. Blue Ball is often listed among the "delightfully-named towns" in Pennsylvania Dutch Country, alongside Pleasureville, Intercourse, Mount Joy, Lititz, Bareville, Bird-in-Hand, Fertility and Paradise.

== Geography ==
Blue Ball is in eastern Lancaster County, in the western part of East Earl Township. Pennsylvania Route 23 (Main Street) leads northeast 9 miles (14 km) to the Pennsylvania Turnpike at Morgantown and southwest through New Holland 16 miles (26 km) to Lancaster, the county seat. U.S. Route 322 (Division Highway) crosses PA 23 in the center of Blue Ball; it leads northwest 8 miles (13 km) to Ephrata and southeast 20 miles (32 km) to Downingtown.

Shirks Run which flows through Blue Ball, leading northwest to the Conestoga River. It has a hot-summer humid continental climate (Dfa) like the remainder of Lancaster County. Average monthly temperatures range from 30.0 °F in January to 74.6 °F in July. The hardiness zone is 6b.

== Demographics ==
Historical population
Census	Pop.	Note	%±
2010	1,031		—
2020	1,084		5.1%
U.S. Decennial Census
