= Intercourse, Pennsylvania =

Unincorporated community in Pennsylvania, US

Intercourse
- Census-designated place
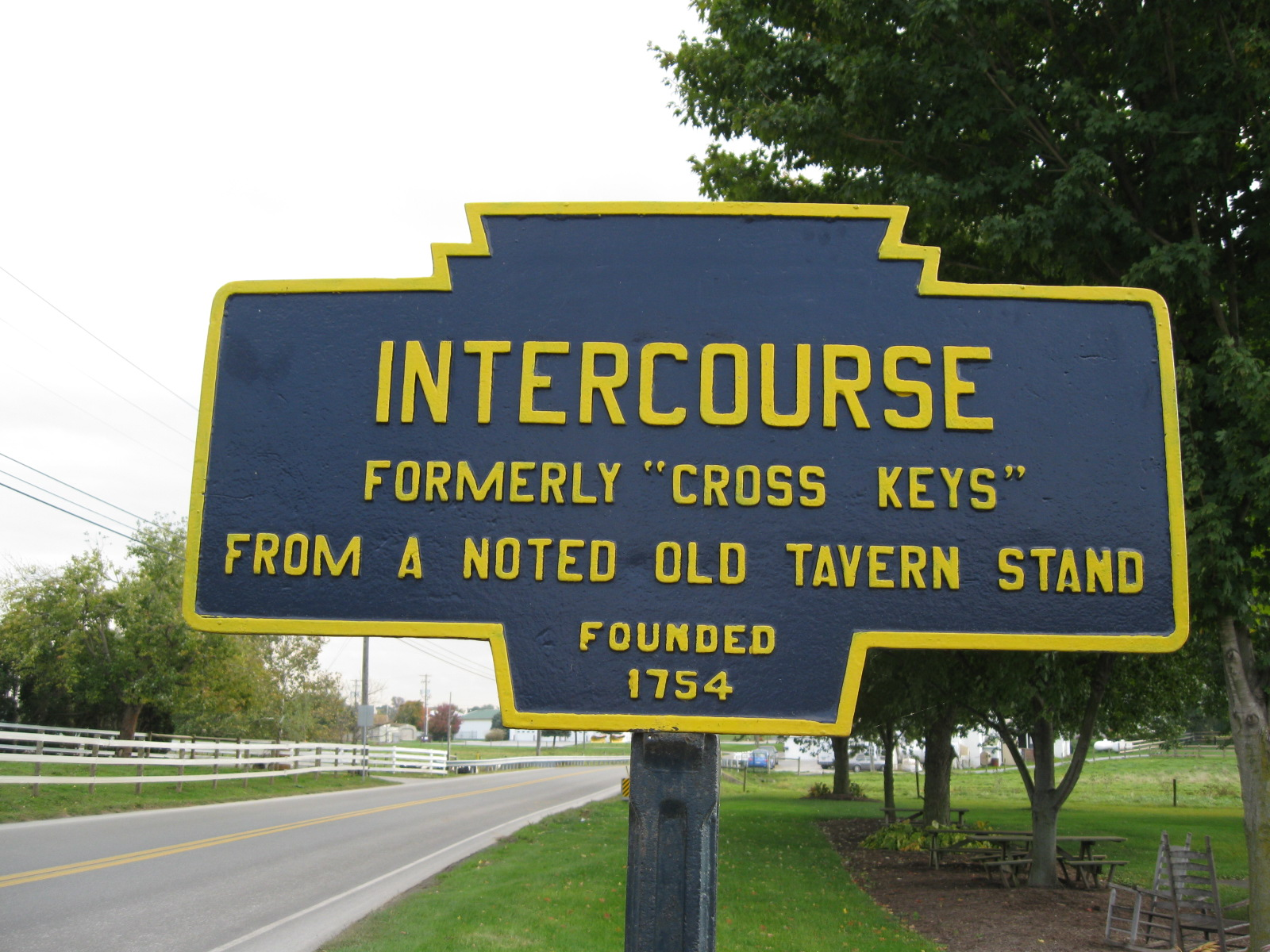
- Keystone Marker

- Location in Pennsylvania Location in the United States
- Coordinates: 40°2′18″N 76°6′27″W
- Country: United States
- State: Pennsylvania
- County: Lancaster
- Township: Leacock

Area
  - Total: 2.11 sq mi (5.46 km^{2})
  - Land: 2.11 sq mi (5.46 km^{2})
  - Water: 0 sq mi (0.00 km^{2})
- Elevation: 430 ft (130 m)

Population (2020)
  - Total: 1,494
  - Density: 708.6/sq mi (273.59/km^{2})
- Time zone: UTC-5 (Eastern (EST))
  - Summer (DST): UTC-4 (EDT)
- ZIP Codes: 17534 (PO box); 17529 (Gordonville)
- Area code: 717
- FIPS code: 42-37016
- GNIS feature ID: 1177822

Intercourse is an unincorporated community and census-designated place (CDP) in Leacock Township, Lancaster County, in the U.S. state of Pennsylvania, 10 miles (16 km) east of Lancaster on Pennsylvania Route 340. As of the 2020 census, the population was 1,494, up from 1,274 at the previous census. It is about 8 miles away from Blue Ball, a town with a similarly unusual name.

Intercourse is a popular site for tourists because of its location in Amish country and its sexually suggestive name. The movie Witness was filmed in Intercourse as well as other parts of the surrounding area, and For Richer or Poorer was set there, though not filmed in Intercourse. Because of the town's unusual name, the sign posts for the town are frequently targeted by thieves.

== History ==
Intercourse was founded in 1754. The community was originally named "Cross Keys", after a local tavern. Intercourse became the name in 1814. The village website gives several theories for the origins of the name:

Another theory concerns two famous roads that crossed here. The Old King's highway from Philadelphia to Pittsburgh (now the Old Philadelphia Pike) ran east and west through the center of the town. The road from Wilmington to Erie intersected in the middle. The joining of these two roads is claimed by some to be the basis for the town 'Cross Keys' or eventually 'Intercourse'. A final idea comes from the use of language during the early days of the village. The word 'intercourse' was commonly used to describe the 'fellowship' and 'social interaction and support' shared in the community of faith, which was much a part of a rural village like this one.

Another theory is that it is derived from a racecourse on the edge of town called "Entercourse".

== Geography ==
Intercourse is located in east-central Lancaster County, in the center of Leacock Township. Pennsylvania Route 340 (Old Philadelphia Pike) passes through the center of town, leading west 10 miles (16 km) to Lancaster, the county seat, and east 22 miles (35 km) to Downingtown. Pennsylvania Route 772 (East and West Newport Road) joins PA 340 for two blocks in the center of town; it leads northwest 6 miles (10 km) to Leola and southeast 6 miles (10 km) to Gap.

According to the U.S. Census Bureau, the Intercourse CDP has a total area of 2.1 square miles (5.5 km^{2}), of which 0.6 acres (2,396 m^{2}), or 0.04%, are water. Muddy Run, a westward-flowing tributary of Conestoga River, forms the northern edge of the community.

Intercourse has a hot-summer humid continental climate (Dfa) like the remainder of Lancaster County. Average monthly temperatures range from 30.1 °F (−1.1 °C) in January to 74.7 °F (23.7 °C) in July. The local hardiness zone is 6b.

== Demographics ==
Historical population
Census	Pop.	Note	%±
2010	1,274		—
2020	1,494		17.3%
U.S. Censuses: 2010, and 2020

According to the 2020 "ACS 5-Year Estimates Data Profiles", 41.0% of the township's population spoke only English, while 51.6 spoke an "other [than Spanish] Indo-European language" (mostly being Pennsylvania German/German).

== Economy ==
Tourism and farming are major industries in the area. Small businesses sell Amish crafts and food and give horse and buggy rides. The town thrives on thousands of tourists who visit the region each year. Most of the land surrounding the town is farmland.

== In popular culture ==
The village's name is often the subject of jokes relating to sexual intercourse. Along with that of Blue Ball, Pennsylvania, which could be mistaken for the slang term "blue balls," a term for a temporary testicular and prostate fluid congestion due to prolonged and unsatisfied sexual excitement, the publishers of Eros Magazine sought mailing privileges from the postmasters of the town. Intercourse and Blue Ball are often named in lists of "delightfully-named towns" in Pennsylvania Dutch Country, along with Gap, Fertility, Mount Joy, Lititz, Bareville, Bird-in-Hand and Paradise. The village's name has also been a source for humor on the Mennonite satire website The Daily Bonnet, in the episode ‘’The Old Man and the "C" Student’’ of The Simpsons as well as an episode of The Cleveland Show.

== Sites of interest ==
- American Military Edged Weaponry Museum
- People's Place Quilt Museum
- The People's Place
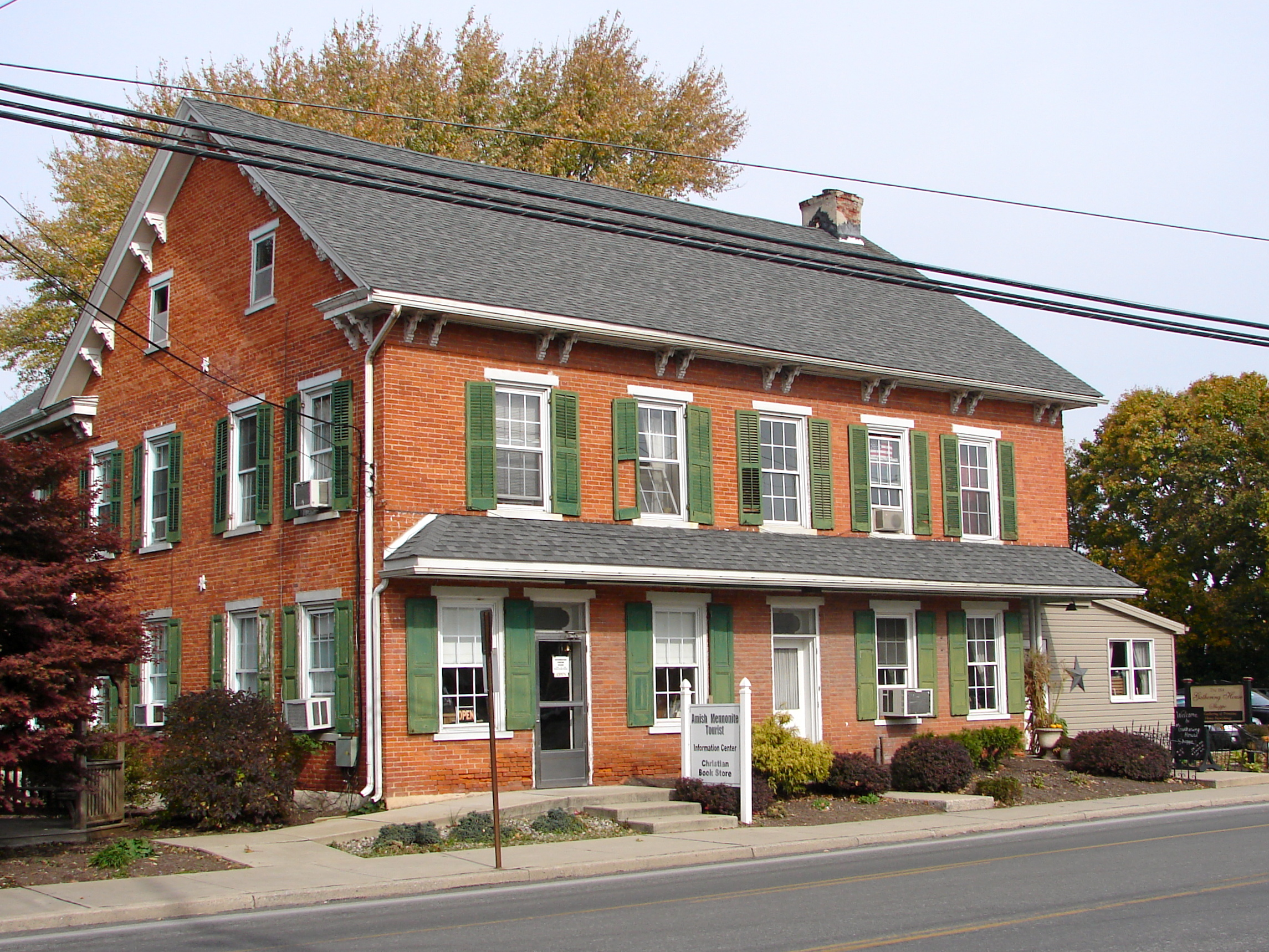
Amish and Mennonite Tourist Information Center

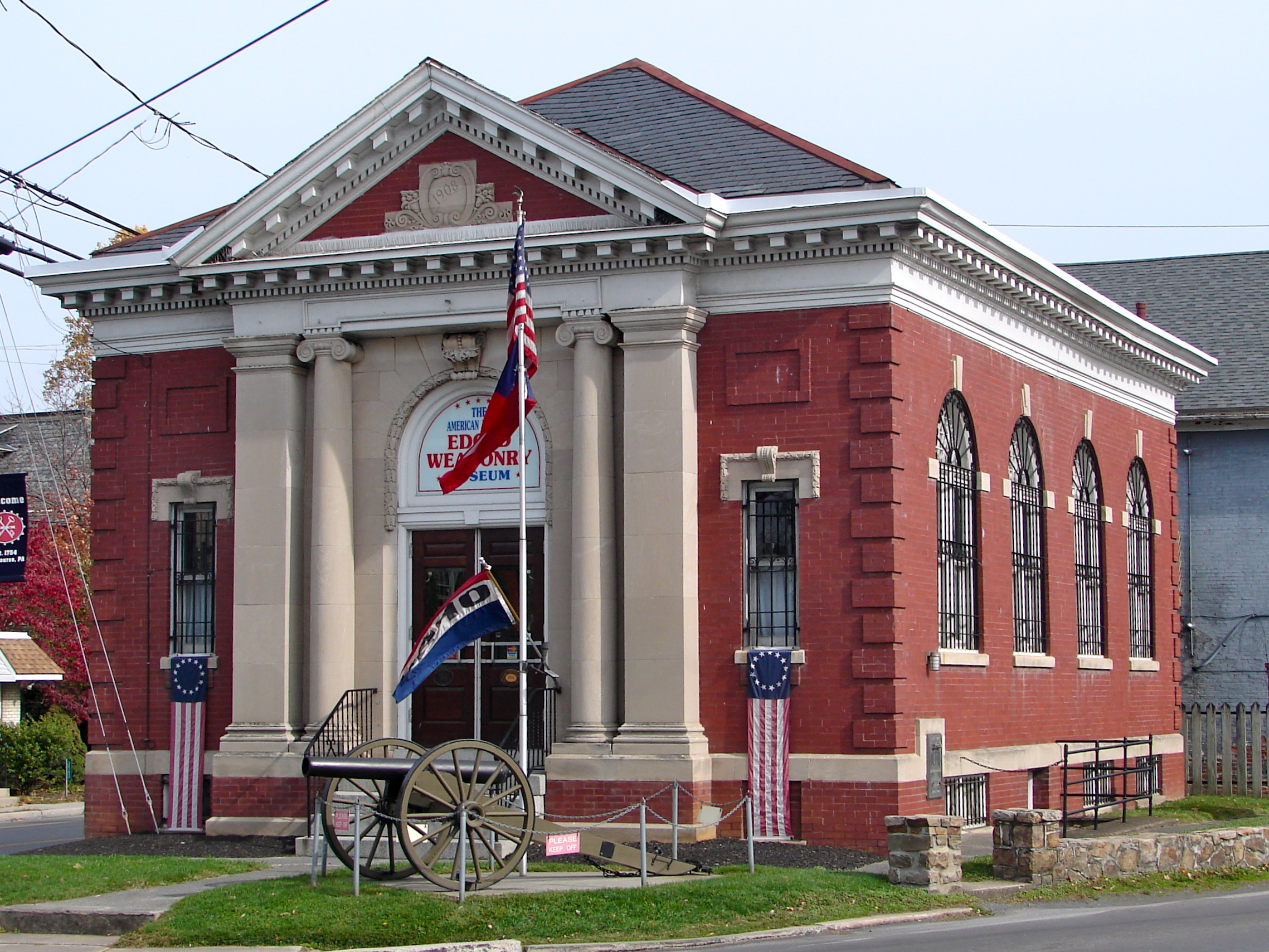
American Military Edged Weapons Museum

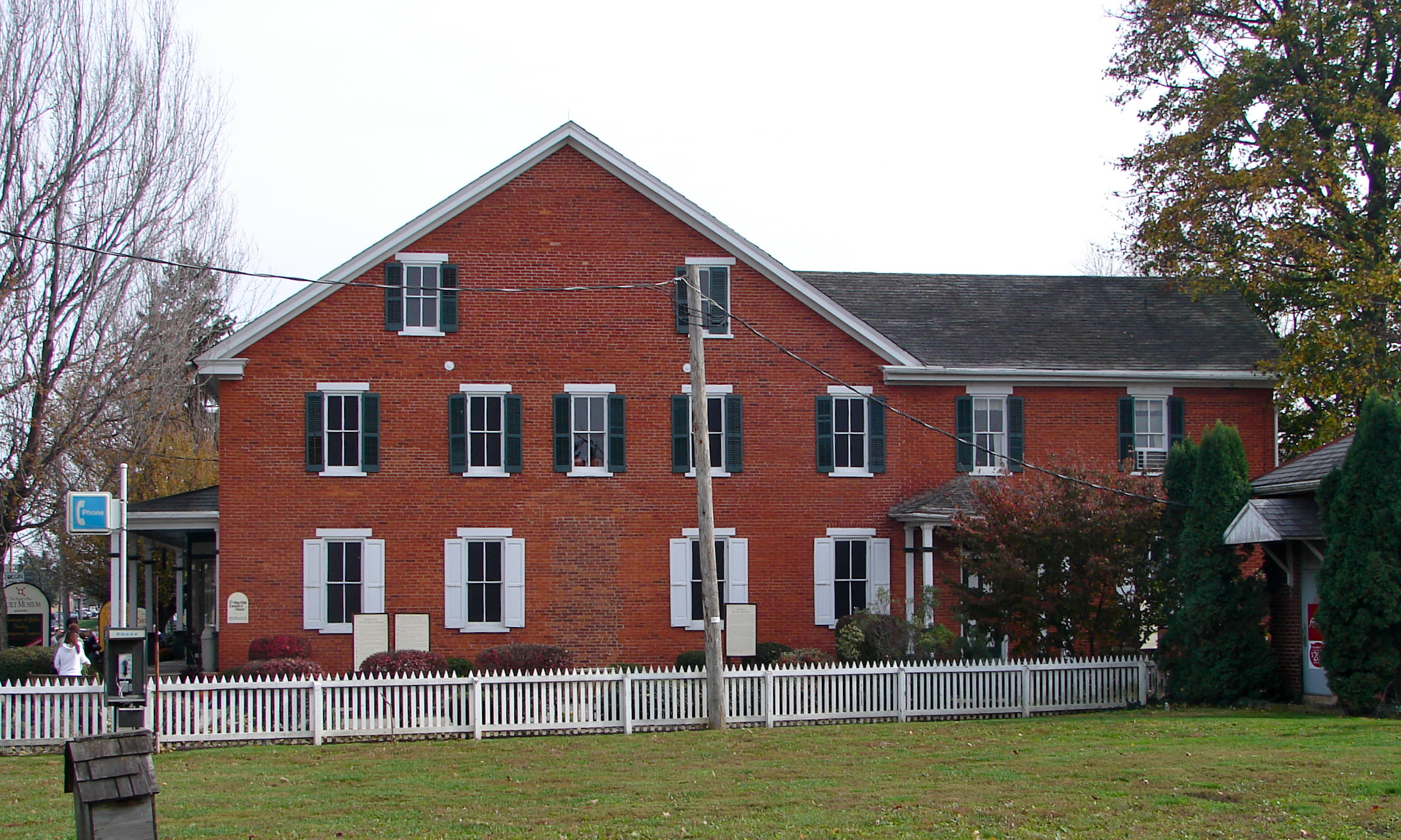
People's Place Quilt Museum

== Notable people ==
- John McGraw, baseball pitcher
- Stephen Scott, Anabaptist writer
