= Gordonville, Pennsylvania =

Unincorporated community in Pennsylvania, US

Cordonville, Pennsylvania
- Census-designated place
- Location in Pennsylvania Location in the United States
- Coordinates: 40°1′12″N 76°8′2″W
- Country: United States
- State: Pennsylvania
- County: Lancaster
- Township: Leacock

Area
  - Total: 0.95 sq mi (2.46 km^{2})
  - Land: 0.95 sq mi (2.46 km^{2})
  - Water: 0 sq mi (0.00 km^{2})
- Elevation: 400 ft (120 m)

Population (2020)
  - Total: 523
  - Density: 550.8/sq mi (212.67/km^{2})
- Time zone: UTC-5 (Eastern (EST))
  - Summer (DST): UTC-4 (EDT)
- ZIP code: 17529
- Area code: 717
- FIPS code: 42-30136
- GNIS feature ID: 1175839

Gordonville is an unincorporated community and census-designated place (CDP) in Leacock Township, Pennsylvania, United States. The population was 508 as of the 2010 census. Though the village is little known outside its immediate area, the surrounding countryside has been portrayed in many books and magazine articles. The Old Order Amish constitute a significant cultural presence in the area of the village. Wendell Berry mentioned the town in one of his collections of essays.

== Geography ==
The village is in eastern Lancaster County in the southwestern corner of Leacock Township, approximately 10 miles (16 km) east of the county seat of Lancaster, 2 miles (3 km) southwest of the village of Intercourse, less than one mile (1.1 km) north of Paradise, and about 3 miles (5 km) southeast of Bird-in-Hand. Gordonville is bordered to the southwest and south by Soudersburg.

According to the U.S. Census Bureau, the Gordonville CDP has an area of 0.97 square miles (2.5 km^{2}), all land. The community drains south to Pequea Creek, a southwestward-flowing tributary of the Susquehanna River.

There are 153 farms in Leacock Township; all but seven are owned by Amish families. These small-scale farms (many with small shops) dot the gently rolling and open landscape around the village. Though rural in character, Gordonville is at the edge of the metropolis: Amtrak Keystone Service trains pass daily through the village on runs to Lancaster and Harrisburg to the west and Philadelphia and New York City to the east. Though there was once a train station in the center of the village, no train has officially stopped there since the 1950s. On back roads, horse-drawn buggies and automobiles occasionally compete for space with rollerblading Amish youth and Amish men on scooters commuting to local jobs.

== Demographics ==
Historical population
Census	Pop.	Note	%±
2020	523		—
U.S. Decennial Census

== History ==
Gordonville is located on part of a grant of 2,300 acres (9.3 km^{2}) of land to the Mary Feree family by the sons of William Penn. The town resulted from the railroad that planned to pass through the area. Around 1829 land was surveyed for the Philadelphia and Columbia Railroad, chartered in 1823 and again in 1826, to run between Philadelphia and Columbia, a growing city along the Susquehanna River south of Harrisburg. Land on the south and west side of the railway route belonged to the Christian Hershey family, which was associated with the land from as early as 1709. Daniel Gordon erected the first dwelling on land now associated with the village in 1832 (some say 1834), a 2 1/2-story, five-bay brick farmhouse with central doorway, largely intact gallery under gable roof, with first floor windows on facade to floor. The house was inhabited by Henry Eckert in the 1880s, and is still occupied today, though divided into several apartments.

Early trains on the railroad were merely wagons, fitted to run on tracks and pulled by horses along the single track. The first U.S.-made locomotive, built at Philadelphia's Baldwin Locomotive Works, was produced in 1832. On 17 April 1834 the first long distance steam train ran through Gordonville along the new Columbia Railroad; the 60-mile (97 km) journey from Lancaster to Philadelphia took about eight and one half hours. Only one track was in use until October of that year; turnouts every one and a half miles allowed for passing. By 1836 Daniel Gordon had a house, a warehouse, and a storehouse on the south and west side of the railway, and the town was starting to grow. In 1857 the Pennsylvania Railroad purchased Pennsylvania's Main Line of Public Works, which by then included the Philadelphia and Columbia Railroad and an ambitious cross-Appalachian canal project. The nickname "Main Line" was affixed to the railroad route. Abraham Lincoln spoke from his train at nearby Leaman Place-Strasburg railroad junction on 22 February 1861, only one mile east of Gordonville; over 5,000 people were present. (In 1968 Hubert H. Humphrey, candidate for president, stopped and spoke at the same place.) In 1870 two barns in Gordonville were destroyed by fire caused by locomotive sparks. The 1895 U.S. Atlas described the village of Gordonville as having a population of 413, a railroad station, post office, and express office. By 1898 the railway was widened to four tracks, and by the early twentieth century 200 trains per day passed through the town. The building of the famous (and now abandoned) low grade railway in the southern end of the Lancaster County in 1906 drastically reduced train traffic. The railway line was electrified in 1938. Later in the early twentieth century only six passenger trains and two freight trains actually made scheduled stops at Gordonville station each day. One of the freights was the morning milk train. Today the village has a population of about 460 people. Amtrak trains still travel through the town along the railway that brought about the town's birth. There is talk of a new station to be erected at Leaman Place, a mile east of Gordonville at the Strasburg RR junction, which would serve Amtrak and SEPTA trains.

== Spring sale and auction ==
The Annual Spring Sale and Auction of the Gordonville Fire Company and Ambulance Association, held the second Saturday of March, is the largest event of its kind on the East Coast. A tradition since 1969, it draws about 12,000 people (about 4,500 registered bidders) to bid on farm machinery, horses, quilts, carriages, old stuff, and antiques. When not actively buying, people socialize, tourists observe, and some Old Order Amish and Old Order Mennonite youth play cornerball, a traditional and "acrobatic" game played with a small hard ball on a field of manure, mud, and straw. Though similar mud sale auctions abound in Lancaster County in the spring, none has as many people attending. Proceeds of the sale assist the upkeep of fire equipment.

On March 13, 1993, the fire company auction was abruptly closed at 10:00 am by state police, who announced that an unseasonable snowfall would eventually block the roads, stranding people in town. Most people were gone by 11:00 am. At noon the last people to attempt to leave, a family which actively volunteered with the fire company, ambulance, and the spring sale, discovered that the roads were actually impassable. The family was compelled to spend the night with friends in town. In the next 24 hours, only 24 inches (610 mm) of snow fell, but 50 to 60 mile per hour winds limited visibility and caused drifting snow to block the roads. During the blizzard, the fire company's ambulance crew handled several emergencies, taking people by snowmobile to Bird-in-Hand where, due to nearly continuous plowing, it was still possible to travel to Lancaster city by highway. Sunday morning discovered very little activity. Roads were blocked by frozen four and five feet high snow drifts until the early afternoon. The auction field contained farm machinery and over a hundred carriages buried under snow. It was at least a week before things were normal. Some called it the snowfall of the century, but on January 8, 1996, a two-foot snowfall led to all roadways in 47 Pennsylvania counties being closed by the governor's order.
