= Leacock-Leola-Bareville, Pennsylvania =

Leacock-Leola-Bareville is a census-designated place (CDP) in Lancaster County, Pennsylvania, in the United States. As of the 2000 census, the CDP population was 6,625. The area is heavily populated by the Amish and Mennonites. Bareville is often named in lists of "delightfully-named towns" in Pennsylvania Dutchland, along with Intercourse, Blue Ball, Lititz, Mount Joy, Bird-in-Hand and Paradise.

== Geography ==
Leacock-Leola-Bareville is located at 40°05′22″N 76°11′06″W.

According to the United States Census Bureau, the CDP has a total area of 6.0 square miles (16 km^{2}), virtually all of it land.

== Demographics ==
As of the census of 2000, there were 6,625 people, 2,429 households, and 1,807 families residing in the CDP. The population density was 1,098.6 inhabitants per square mile (424.2/km^{2}). There were 2,506 housing units at an average density of 415.6 per square mile (160.5/km^{2}). The racial makeup of the CDP was 90.75% White, 1.49% African American, 0.14% Native American, 4.66% Asian, 1.36% from other races, and 1.60% from two or more races. Hispanic or Latino of any race were 3.95% of the population.

There were 2,429 households, out of which 35.9% had children under the age of 18 living with them, 63.2% were married couples living together, 8.0% had a female householder with no husband present, and 25.6% were non-families. 20.5% of all households were made up of individuals, and 7.4% had someone living alone who was 65 years of age or older. The average household size was 2.72 and the average family size was 3.17.

In the CDP, the population was spread out, with 27.3% under the age of 18, 8.9% from 18 to 24, 28.4% from 25 to 44, 23.2% from 45 to 64, and 12.2% who were 65 years of age or older. The median age was 36 years. For every 100 females, there were 97.4 males. For every 100 females age 18 and over, there were 94.6 males.

The median income for a household in the CDP was $47,869, and the median income for a family was $51,232. Males had a median income of $35,340 versus $22,202 for females. The per capita income for the CDP was $22,369. About 2.6% of families and 4.7% of the population were below the poverty line, including 7.3% of those under age 18 and 3.1% of those age 65 or over.

== Recent history ==
Leola made headlines in the Spring of 2006 when six members of a single family were found murdered inside a house. The victims were all related to the alleged perpetrator, Jesse Dee Wise, who was 21 at the time of the murders. The killings took place over the Palm Sunday weekend, but the victims were not discovered until later in the week on Wednesday, April 12, 2006. The killings made national and international headlines, even being featured on BBC World News.
