= Soudersburg, Pennsylvania =

Place in Pennsylvania, United States

- Census-designated place
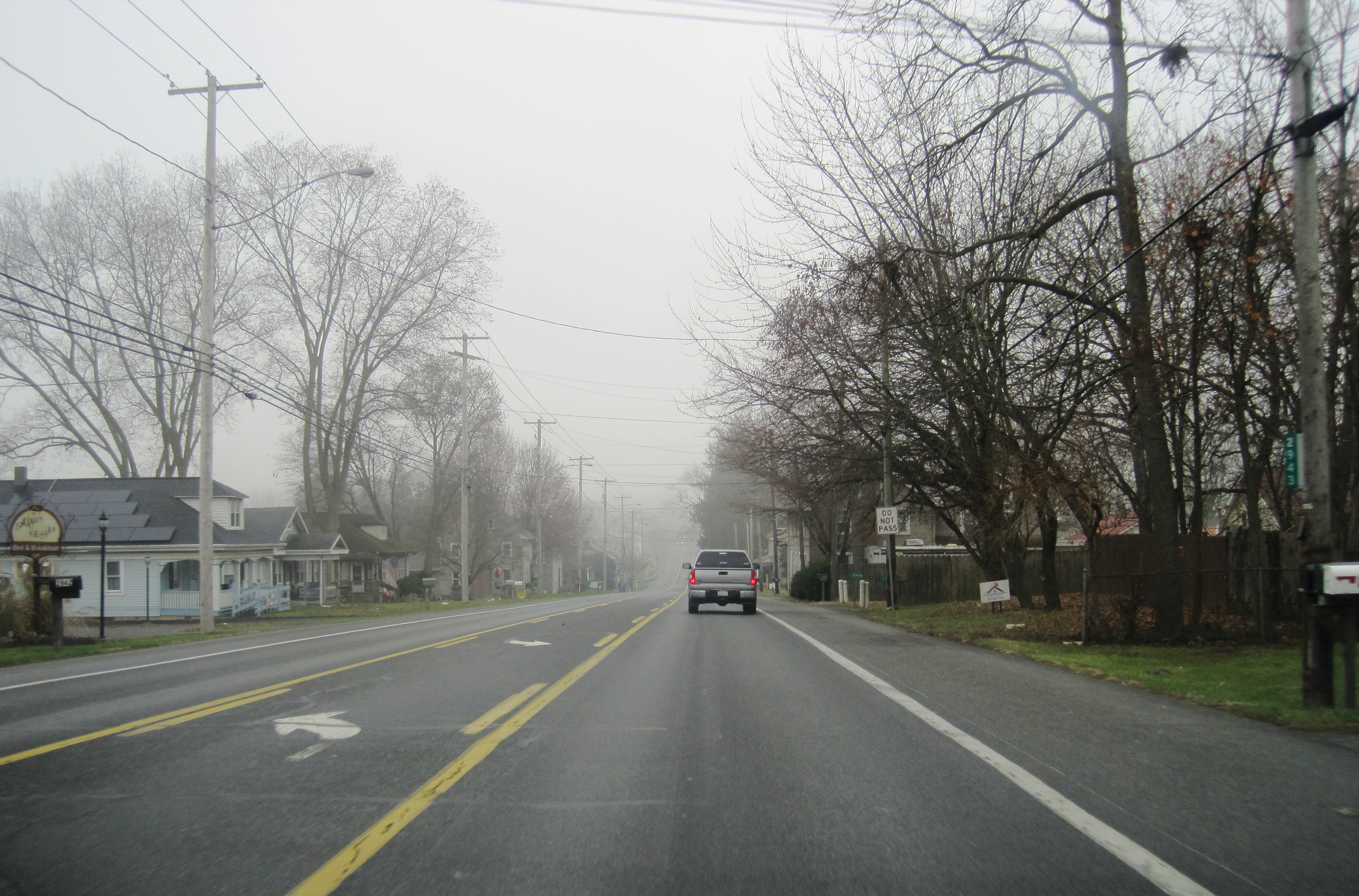
- Westbound US 30 through Soudersburg

- Location within Pennsylvania Location within the United States
- Country: United States
- State: Pennsylvania
- County: Lancaster
- Townships: East Lampeter, Leacock

Area
  - Total: 1.15 sq mi (2.99 km^{2})
  - Land: 1.14 sq mi (2.95 km^{2})
  - Water: 0.015 sq mi (0.04 km^{2})
- Elevation: 376 ft (115 m)

Population (2010)
  - Total: 540
  - Density: 474/sq mi (182.9/km^{2})
- Time zone: UTC-5 (Eastern (EST))
  - Summer (DST): UTC-4 (EDT)
- ZIP code: 17572
- FIPS code: 42-71848
- GNIS feature ID: 1188004

Soudersburg is an unincorporated community and census-designated place (CDP) in East Lampeter and Leacock townships in Lancaster County, Pennsylvania, United States. As of the 2010 census, the population was 540.

== Geography ==
Soudersburg is in eastern Lancaster County, in the eastern corner of East Lampeter Township and the southwestern corner of Leacock Township. It is bordered to the northwest by Ronks, to the northeast by Gordonville, and to the southeast by Paradise. U.S. Route 30, the Lincoln Highway, passes through Soudersburg, leading west 8 miles (13 km) to Lancaster, the county seat, and east 18 miles (29 km) to Coatesville.

According to the U.S. Census Bureau, the Soudersburg CDP has a total area of 1.2 square miles (3.0 km^{2}), of which 0.02 square miles (0.04 km^{2}), or 1.21%, are water. Pequea Creek forms the southern boundary of the CDP and the border with Paradise Township. The creek is a southwest-flowing tributary of the Susquehanna River.
