= Bank of Bird-in-Hand =

American bank based in Pennsylvania

- Type: Private company
- Industry: Banking
- Founded: November 27, 2013; 12 years ago
- Headquarters: Bird-in-Hand, Pennsylvania, United States
- Key people: Alan Dakey (Former CEO); Lori Maley (CEO)
- Products: Retail banking
- Website: bihbank.com

Bank of Bird-in-Hand is an American bank, the first in the United States to open following the passage of the Dodd Frank Act in 2010. It was founded in Bird-in-Hand, Pennsylvania, by a group of local Amish and non-Amish investors.

== History ==
On November 27, 2013, the Federal Deposit Insurance Corporation approved the launch of Bank of Bird-in-Hand. At the time of opening, the bank had $17 million in capital.

The bank celebrated its first anniversary on December 2, 2014.

Lori Maley replaced Alan Dakey as CEO of the bank on March 1, 2017.

=== Assets ===
As of June 30, 2020, the bank reported total assets of $527.5 million, total deposits of $453.2 million, total net loans of $425.0 million, and total shareholders’ equity of $57.8 million.

== Location and clientele ==
The bank is located in Bird-in-Hand in Pennsylvanian Amish Country with several branches in and around Lancaster County, plus several vans operating as their mobile branch. The bank caters mostly to Amish borrowers, however not exclusively.

== Building ==
The bank includes a drive-through window designed to accommodate a horse-drawn buggy.
