= Bird-in-Hand Hotel =

- U.S. National Register of Historic Places
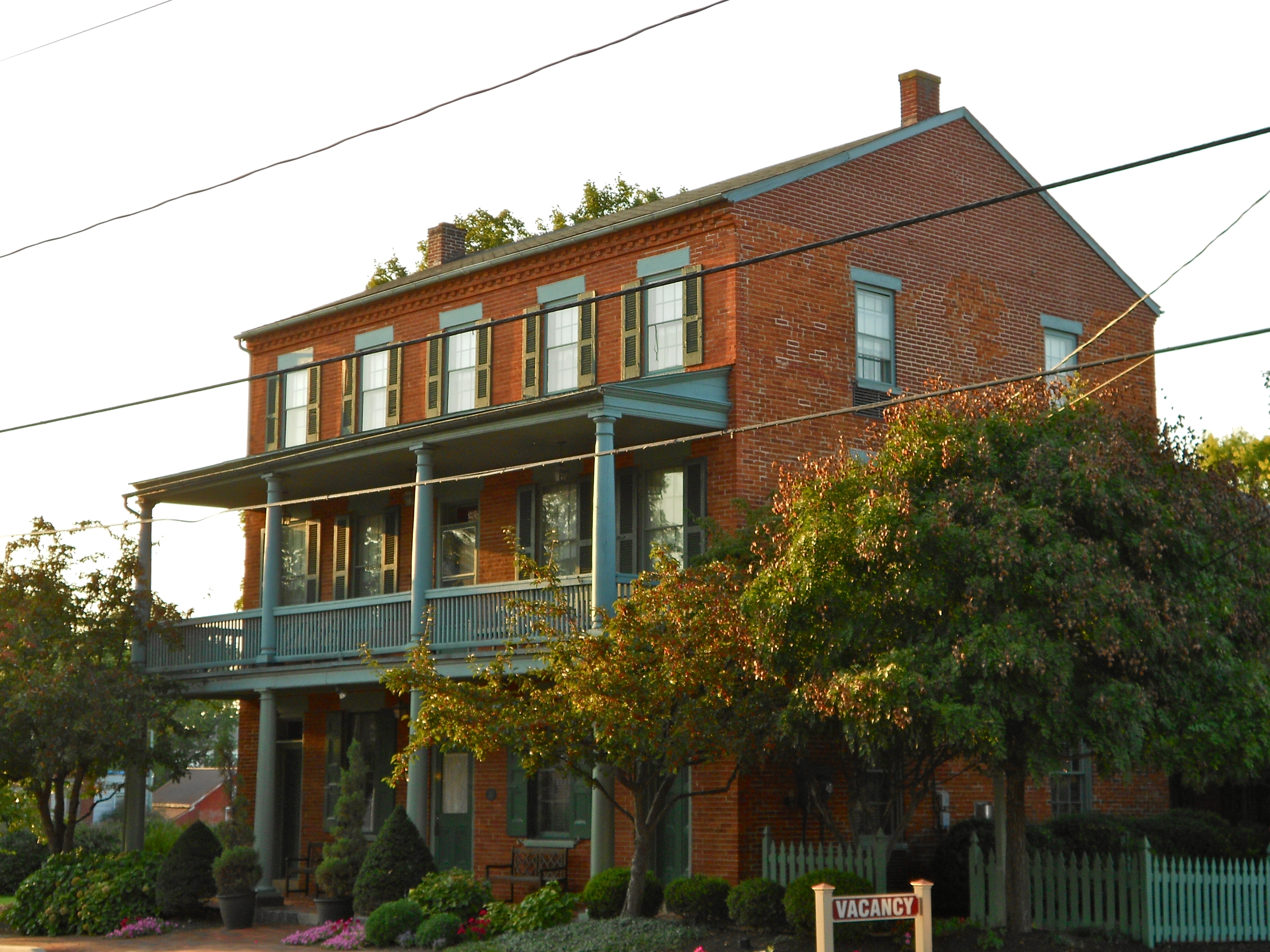
- Bird-in-Hand Hotel, September 2012

- Location within Pennsylvania Location within the United States
- Location: 2695 Old Philadelphia Pike (PA 340), Bird-in-Hand, East Lampeter Township, Pennsylvania
- Coordinates: 40°8′1″N 75°57′38″W
- Area: 2.4 acres (0.97 ha)
- Built: 1852
- Architectural style: Greek Revival
- NRHP reference No.: 92000950
- Added to NRHP: July 24, 1992

Bird-in-Hand Hotel, also known as the Bird-In-Hand Village Inn & Suites or the Rhoad's Hotel, is a historic hotel located at Bird-in-Hand, East Lampeter Township, Lancaster County, Pennsylvania. It was built in 1852, on the site of several earlier wayside taverns. It has a three-story, rectangular brick main block with a 2 1/2-story, rear "T"-wing and a 2-story extension. It features a full-width front porch with Tuscan order columns and a symmetrical facade in a vernacular Greek Revival style. It was renovated in 1989.

It was listed on the National Register of Historic Places in 1992.
