= Bird-in-Hand, Pennsylvania =

Unincorporated community in Pennsylvania, US

- Census-designated place
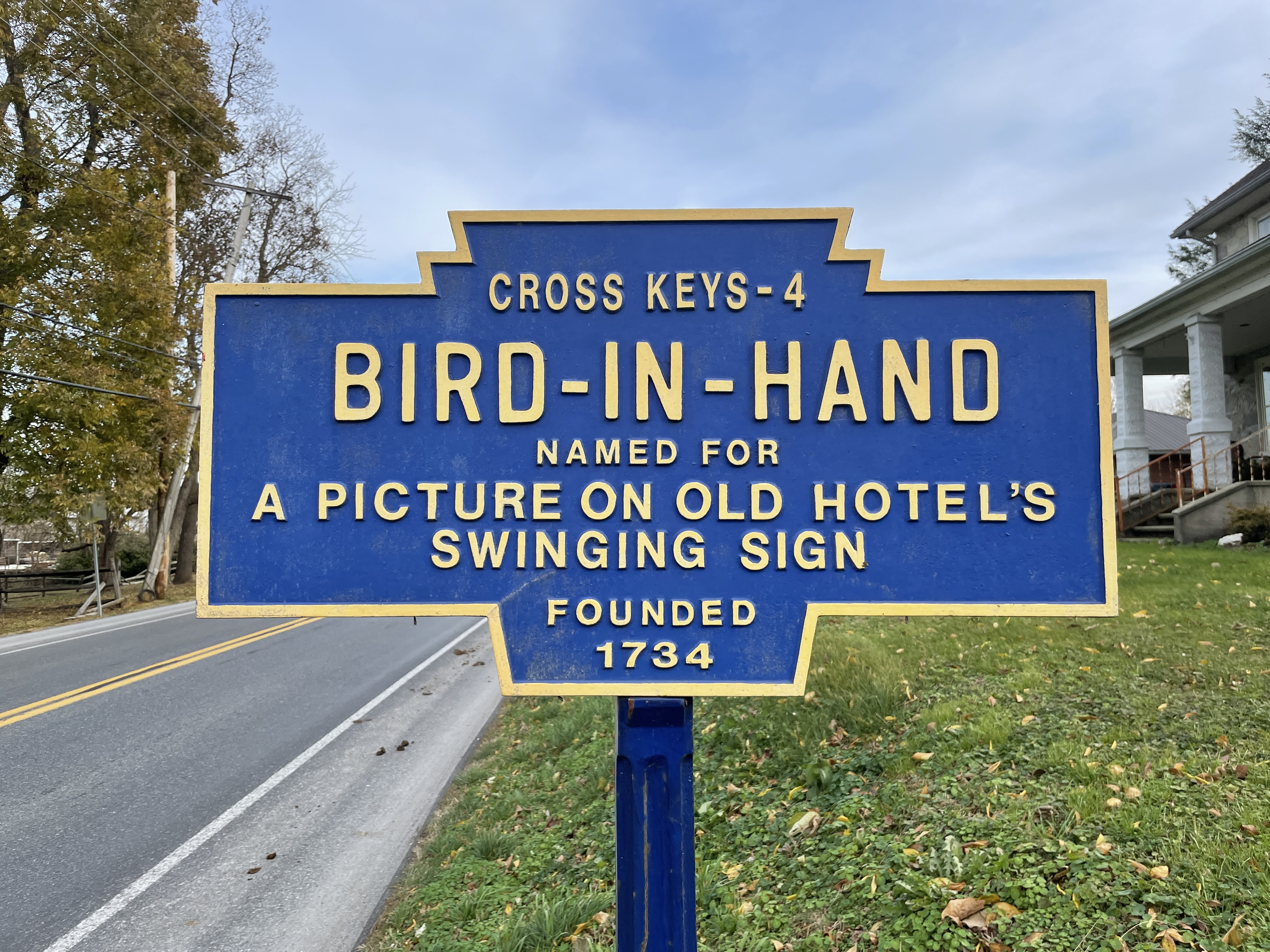
- Keystone Marker

- Location in Pennsylvania Location in the United States
- Coordinates: 40°2′20.5″N 76°11′23.2″W
- Country: United States
- State: Pennsylvania
- County: Lancaster
- Township: East Lampeter

Area
  - Total: 0.63 sq mi (1.62 km^{2})
  - Land: 0.62 sq mi (1.60 km^{2})
  - Water: 0.0077 sq mi (0.02 km^{2})

Population (2020)
  - Total: 427
  - Density: 691.0/sq mi (266.79/km^{2})
- Time zone: UTC-5 (Eastern (EST))
  - Summer (DST): UTC-4 (EDT)
- ZIP code: 17505
- FIPS code: 42-06496
- GNIS feature ID: 1169655

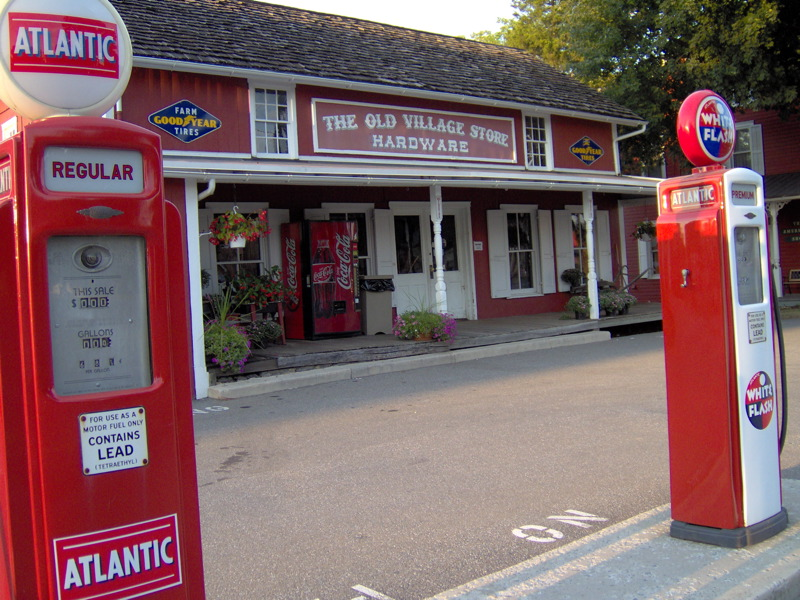
The Old Village Store Hardware

Bird-in-Hand is an unincorporated community and census-designated place (CDP) in Lancaster County, Pennsylvania, United States, in East Lampeter Township. The "Bird in Hand" ZIP code extends east from the CDP into Leacock and Upper Leacock townships. The community has a large Amish and Mennonite population. As of the 2010 census, the population within the CDP was 402.

== History ==
The area's first inhabitants were Native American Shawnee and Susquehannock people.

The earliest European settlers of what was to become Bird-in-Hand were Quakers and Swiss Mennonites. James Smith was the first of the Quakers known to have settled in the area, arriving by the year 1715. William and Dorothy McNabb were pioneer landowners and the owners of the original Bird-in-Hand Hotel. The Quakers built a meetinghouse and two-story academy, which stands today, next to the present-day Bird-in-Hand fire company.

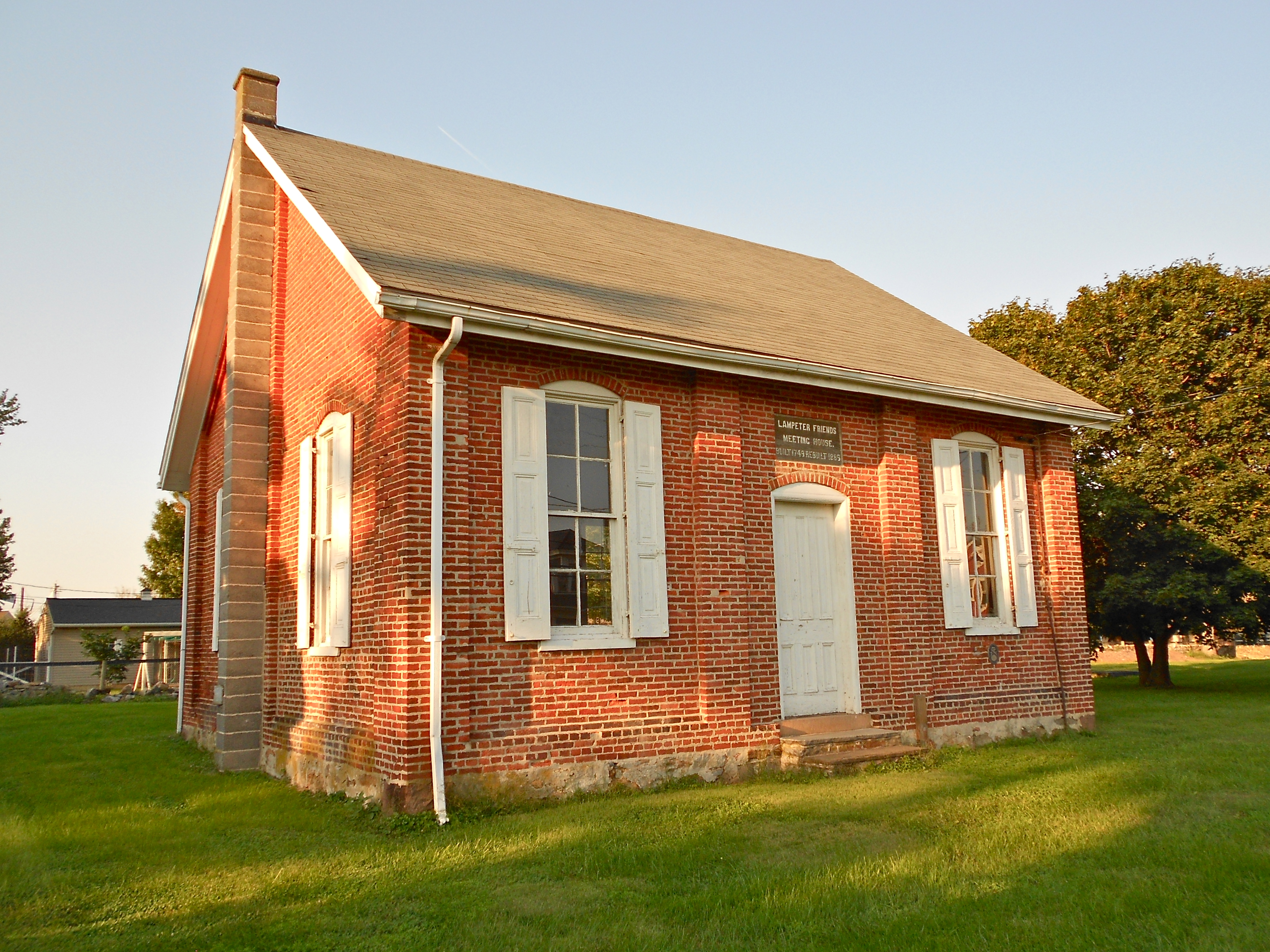
Lampeter Friends Meetinghouse, built 1749, rebuilt 1889

The community was founded in 1734. The legend of the naming of Bird-in-Hand concerns the time when the Old Philadelphia Pike was surveyed between Lancaster and Philadelphia. According to legend, two road surveyors discussed whether they should stay at their present location or go on to the town of Lancaster. One of them supposedly said, "A bird in the hand is worth two in the bush," which means it is preferable to have a small but certain advantage than the mere potential of a greater one; and so they stayed. By 1734, road surveyors were making McNabb's hotel their headquarters rather than returning to Lancaster every day. The sign in front of the inn is known to have once "portrayed a man with a bird in his hand and a bush nearby, in which two birds were perched," and was known as the Bird-in-Hand Inn. Variations of this sign appear throughout the town today.

In 1834 construction began on the 86-mile (138 km) Pennsylvania Railroad line between Philadelphia and Columbia. Bird-in-Hand, featuring tanneries, feed mills, and coal and lumber yards, was the most important stop on the Lancaster-to-Coatesville section.

In 1836 the village post office was established as the Enterprise Post Office, as the village was then officially called, until the name officially changed to Bird-in-Hand in 1873.

The town remained relatively unknown until a musical called Plain and Fancy opened in New York in 1955. The play was set in the village of Bird-in-Hand and is often credited as a catalyst for the boom in Pennsylvania Dutch Country tourism in the mid-twentieth century. Bird-in-Hand is often named in lists of "delightfully-named towns" in Pennsylvania Dutchland, along with Intercourse, Blue Ball, Lititz, Bareville, Mount Joy and Paradise.

In 1968 the Smucker family opened a small 30-room motel called the Bird-in-Hand Motor Inn, with an adjacent coffee shop, in hopes of capitalizing on the growing tourist trade in the area.

In 1976 the Bird-in-Hand Farmers Market opened adjacent to the Bird-in-Hand Motor Inn.

The Bird-in-Hand Village Inn and Suites was listed on the National Register of Historic Places in 1992.

The town is home to the Bank of Bird-in-Hand, the first bank in the United States to open following the passage of the Dodd Frank Act.

== Geography ==
Bird-in-Hand is in central Lancaster County, on the eastern edge of East Lampeter Township. Pennsylvania Route 340 (Old Philadelphia Pike) runs through the center of town, leading west 6 miles (10 km) to Lancaster, the county seat, and east 4 miles (6 km) to Intercourse.

According to the U.S. Census Bureau, the Bird-in-Hand CDP has a total area of 0.62 square miles (1.6 km^{2}), of which 0.01 square miles (0.02 km^{2}), or 1.11%, are water. The area drains westward to Mill Creek, a west-flowing tributary of the Conestoga River, part of the Susquehanna River watershed.

== Demographics ==
Historical population
Census	Pop.	Note	%±
2010	402		—
2020	427		6.2%
U.S. Decennial Census

== Economy ==
Tourism is very important and many businesses cater specifically to tourists. Many of these businesses have an Amish theme, such as horse and buggy rides and crafts.

== Museums and historic sites ==
- Amish Country Homestead
- Lampeter Friends Meetinghouse

== Churches ==
- Bird-in-Hand United Methodist
- Stumptown Mennonite
- Weavertown Amish Mennonite Church
