= Paradise, Pennsylvania =

Unincorporated community in Pennsylvania, US

- Census-designated place
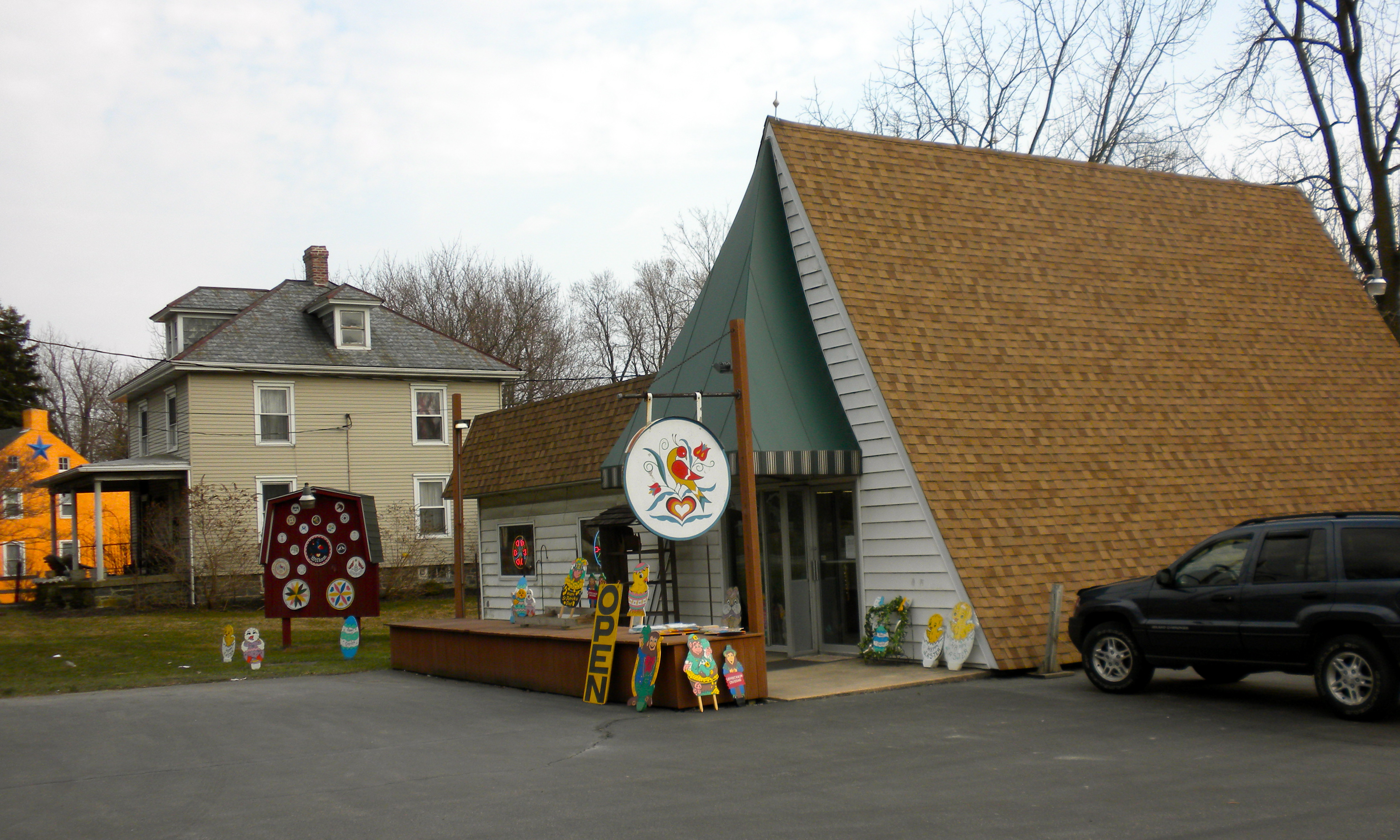
- Souvenir shop in Paradise on U.S. Route 30

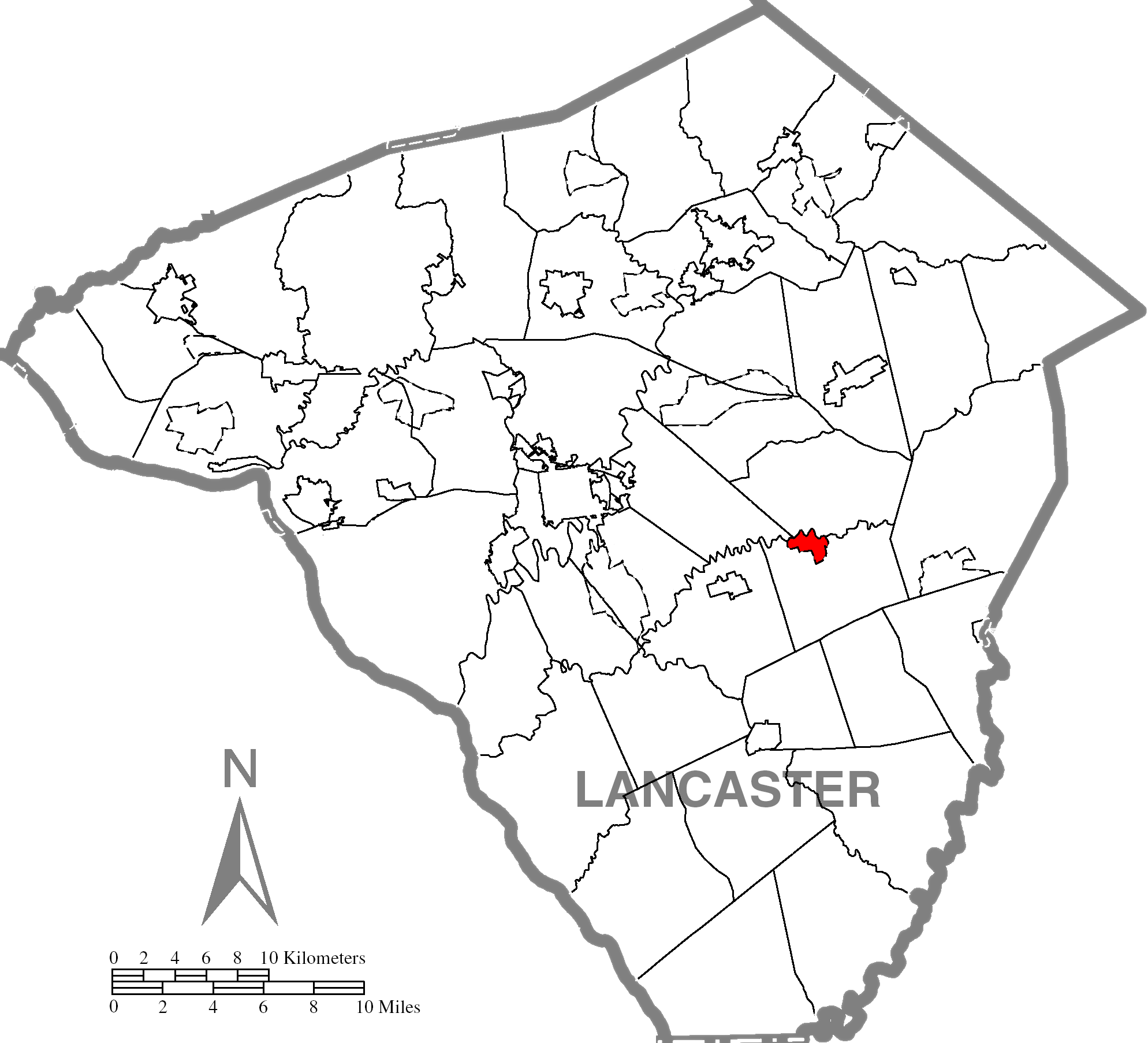
- Location in Lancaster County

- Location in Pennsylvania Location in the United States
- Coordinates: 40°0′35″N 76°7′43″W
- Country: United States
- State: Pennsylvania
- County: Lancaster
- Township: Paradise

Area
  - Total: 1.18 sq mi (3.06 km^{2})
  - Land: 1.17 sq mi (3.02 km^{2})
  - Water: 0.019 sq mi (0.05 km^{2})
- Elevation: 364 ft (111 m)

Population (2020)
  - Total: 1,305
  - Density: 1,120.9/sq mi (432.78/km^{2})
- Time zone: UTC-5 (Eastern (EST))
  - Summer (DST): UTC-4 (EDT)
- ZIP code: 17562
- Area code: 717
- GNIS feature ID: 1183274
- FIPS code: 42-57840

Paradise is an unincorporated community and census-designated place (CDP) in Lancaster County, Pennsylvania, United States, with a ZIP code of 17562. The population was 1,129 at the 2010 census.

Paradise, like Intercourse, is a popular site in Pennsylvania Dutch Country for tourists who like the name of the town; they are together often named in lists of "delightfully named towns" in Pennsylvania Dutchland, along with Blue Ball, Lititz, Bareville, Fertility, Bird-in-Hand and Mount Joy. It was the setting of the 1994 comedy film Trapped in Paradise.

== Geography ==
Paradise is located in eastern Lancaster County at 40°0′34″N 76°7′29″W (40.009469, -76.124781), in the northern part of Paradise Township. Its northern border is Pequea Creek, across which is Soudersburg in Leacock and East Lampeter townships.

U.S. Route 30 (the Lincoln Highway) passes through the center of Paradise, leading west-northwest 9 miles (14 km) to Lancaster, the county seat, and east 16 miles (26 km) to Coatesville. Philadelphia is 60 miles (97 km) east of Paradise.

According to the United States Census Bureau, the CDP has a total area of 1.2 square miles (3.1 km^{2}), of which 0.02 square miles (0.05 km^{2}), or 1.50%, are water. Via the west-flowing Pequea Creek, Paradise is part of the Susquehanna River watershed.

== Demographics ==
Historical population
Census	Pop.	Note	%±
2020	1,305		—
U.S. Decennial Census

At the 2000 census, there were 1,028 people, 363 households and 284 families residing in the CDP. The population density was 907.4 inhabitants per square mile (350.3/km^{2}). There were 386 housing units at an average density of 340.7 units per square mile (131.5 units/km^{2}). The racial makeup was 97.57% White, 1.75% African American, 0.10% Asian, 0.10% from other races, and 0.49% from two or more races. Hispanic or Latino of any race were 1.07% of the population.

There were 363 households, of which 35.8% had children under the age of 18 living with them, 64.2% were married couples living together, 9.9% had a female householder with no husband present, and 21.5% were non-families. 16.0% of all households were made up of individuals, and 5.0% had someone living alone who was 65 years of age or older. The average household size was 2.75 and the average family size was 3.08.

27.2% of the population were under the age of 18, 8.6% from 18 to 24, 29.2% from 25 to 44, 22.5% from 45 to 64, and 12.5% who were 65 years of age or older. The median age was 37 years. For every 100 females, there were 96.2 males. For every 100 females age 18 and over, there were 92.8 males.

The median household income was $41,875 and the median family income was $44,583. Males had a median income of $31,800 and females $21,917. The per capita income was $18,700. About 1.8% of families and 7.1% of the population were below the poverty line, including 4.0% of those under age 18 and 8.5% of those age 65 or over.

== Economy ==
The Paradise Quarry, currently owned and operated by Allan Myers, Inc., is just south of Vintage on McIlvaine Road.
