= Leacock Township, Pennsylvania =

Township in Pennsylvania, US

Coordinates: 40°03′00″N 76°07′59″W

- Township
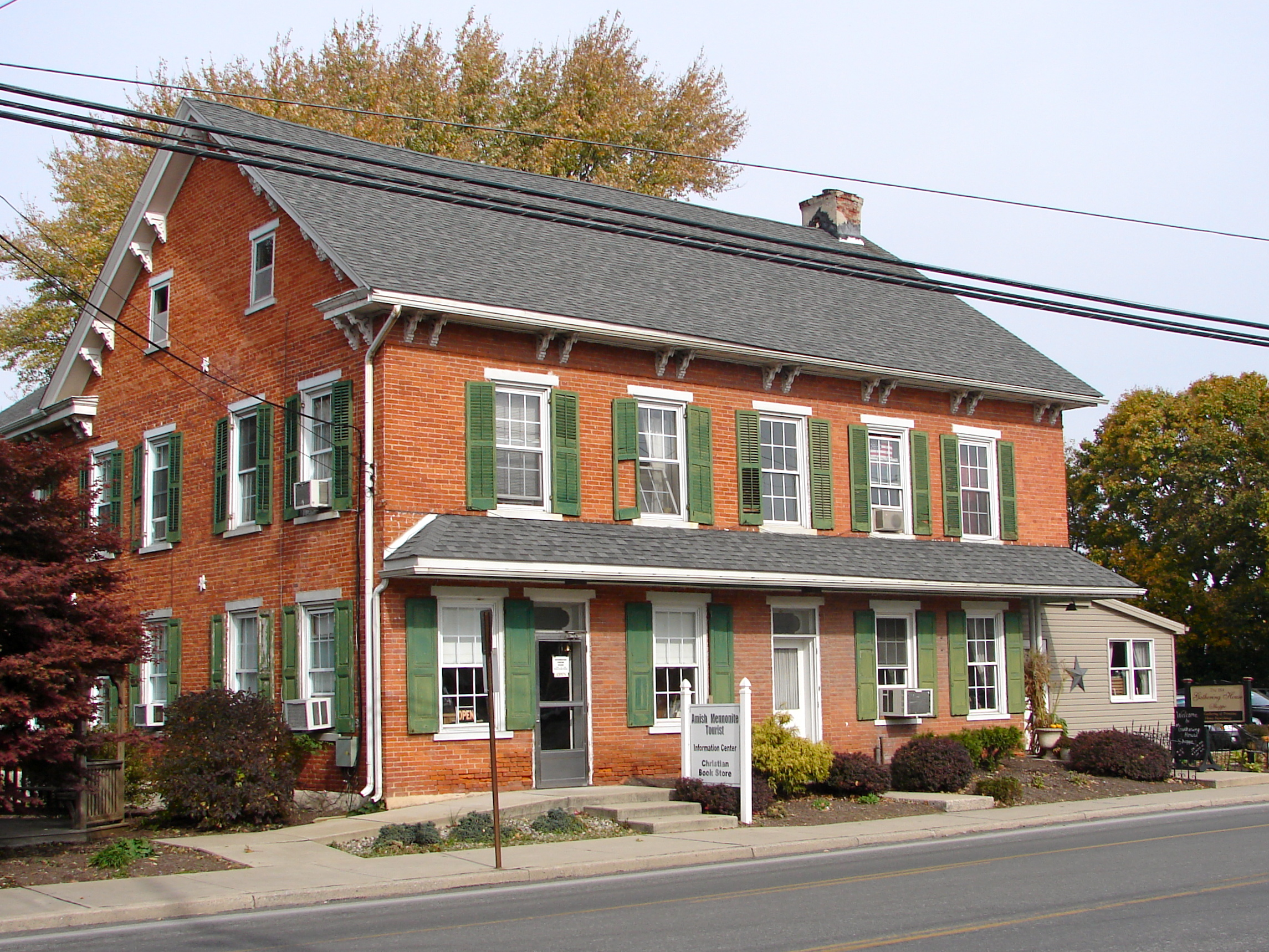
- Tourist information center in Intercourse

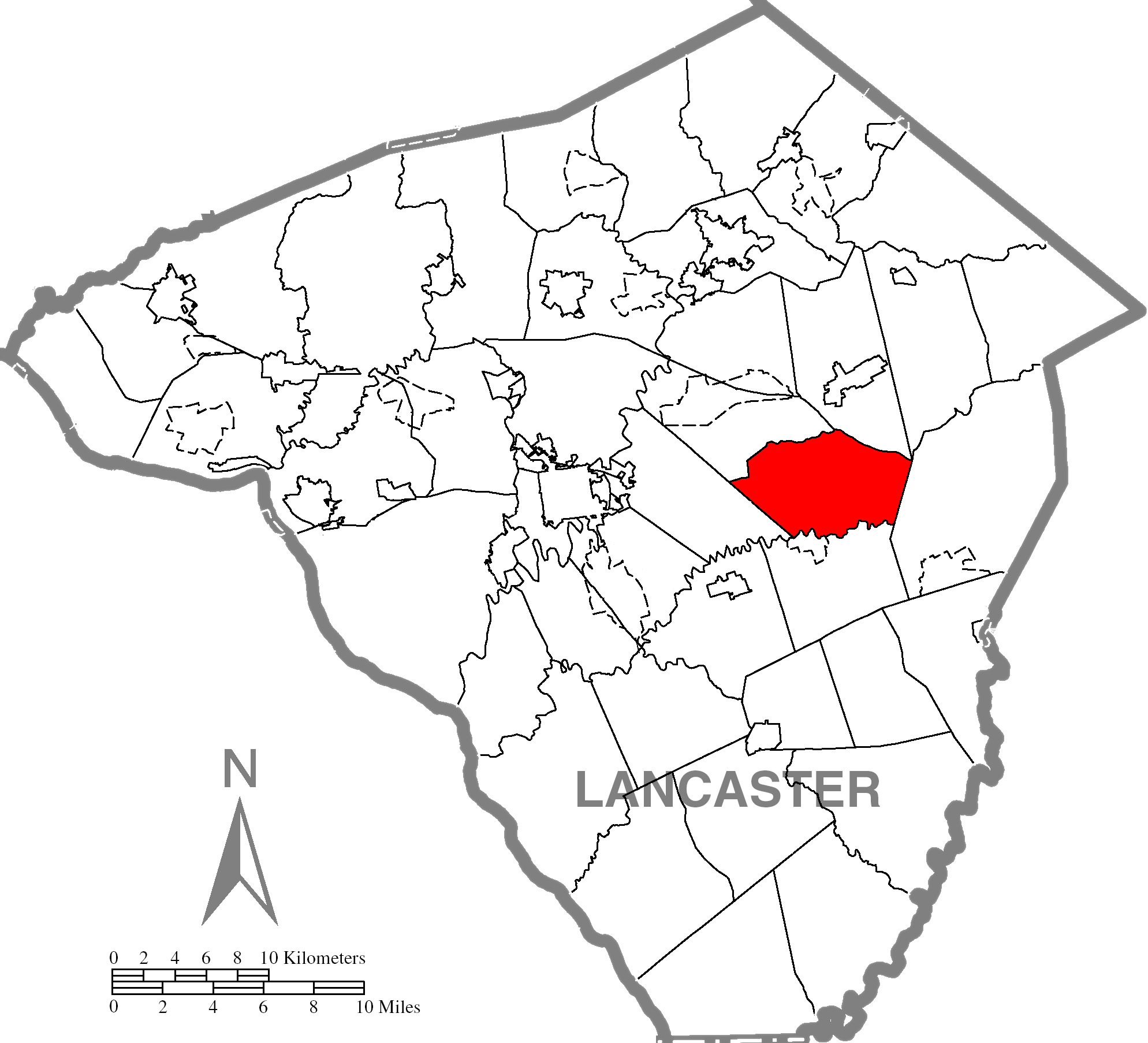
- Map of Lancaster County, Pennsylvania highlighting Leacock Township

- Map of Lancaster County, Pennsylvania
- Country: United States
- State: Pennsylvania
- County: Lancaster
- Settled: 1728
- Incorporated: 1729

Government
  - Type: Board of Supervisors

Area
  - Total: 20.63 sq mi (53.43 km^{2})
  - Land: 20.55 sq mi (53.23 km^{2})
  - Water: 0.077 sq mi (0.20 km^{2})

Population (2020)
  - Total: 5,652
  - Estimate (2024): 5,686 ▲
  - Density: 275.0/sq mi (106.2/km^{2})
- Time zone: UTC-5 (Eastern (EST))
  - Summer (DST): UTC-4 (EDT)
- Area code: 717
- FIPS code: 42-071-42080
- Website: www.leacocktwp.com

Leacock Township is an American township that is located in east central Lancaster County, Pennsylvania. As of the 2020 census, the population of the township was 5,652, an increase over the figure of 5,220 tabulated in 2010.

== History and notable features ==
This township has a large Amish and Mennonite population.

According to the 2020 "ACS 5-Year Estimates Data Profiles", 40.9% of the township's population spoke only English, while 55.7 spoke an "other [than Spanish] Indo-European language."

== Geography ==
According to the U.S. Census Bureau, the township has a total area of 20.7 square miles (54 km^{2}), of which 20.7 square miles (54 km^{2}) is land and 0.04 square miles (0.10 km^{2}) (0.10%) is water.

It encompasses the unincorporated communities of Intercourse, Gordonville, Weavertown, Irishtown, Mascot, and parts of Soudersburg and New Milltown.

== Demographics ==
Historical population
| Census | Pop. | Note | %± |
|---|---|---|---|
| 2000 | 4,878 | | — |
| 2010 | 5,220 | | 7.0% |
| 2020 | 5,652 | | 8.3% |
| 2024 (est.) | 5,686 | | 0.6% |
U.S. Decennial Census 2020

At the time of the 2000 census, there were 4,878 people, 1,426 households, and 1,159 families living in the township.

The population density was 236.0 inhabitants per square mile (91.1/km^{2}). There were 1,476 housing units at an average density of 71.4 per square mile (27.6/km^{2}).

The racial makeup of the township was 98.11% White, 0.41% African American, 0.12% Native American, 0.72% Asian, 0.02% Pacific Islander, 0.14% from other races, and 0.47% from two or more races. Hispanic or Latino of any race were 0.59%.

There were 1,426 households; 41.4% had children under the age of eighteen living with them, 73.8% were married couples living together, 5.3% had a female householder with no husband present, and 18.7% were non-families. 16.7% of households were made up of individuals, and 9.0% were one-person households with residents who were aged sixty-five or older.

The average household size was 3.42 and the average family size was 3.91.

The age distribution was 36.1% who were under the age of eighteen, 12.3% who were aged eighteen to twenty-four, 21.4% who were aged twenty-five to forty-four, 18.0% who were aged forty-five to sixty-four, and 12.2% who were aged sixty-five or older. The median age was twenty-six years.

For every one hundred females there were 101.2 males. For every one hundred females who were aged eighteen or older, there were 97.1 males.

The median household income was $36,887 and the median family income was $41,639. Males had a median income of $30,725 compared with that of $22,917 for females.

The per capita income for the township was $12,848.

Approximately 12.5% of families and 15.4% of the population were living below the poverty line, including 19.8% of those who were under the age of eighteen and 19.2% of those who were aged sixty-five or older.

== Gallery ==
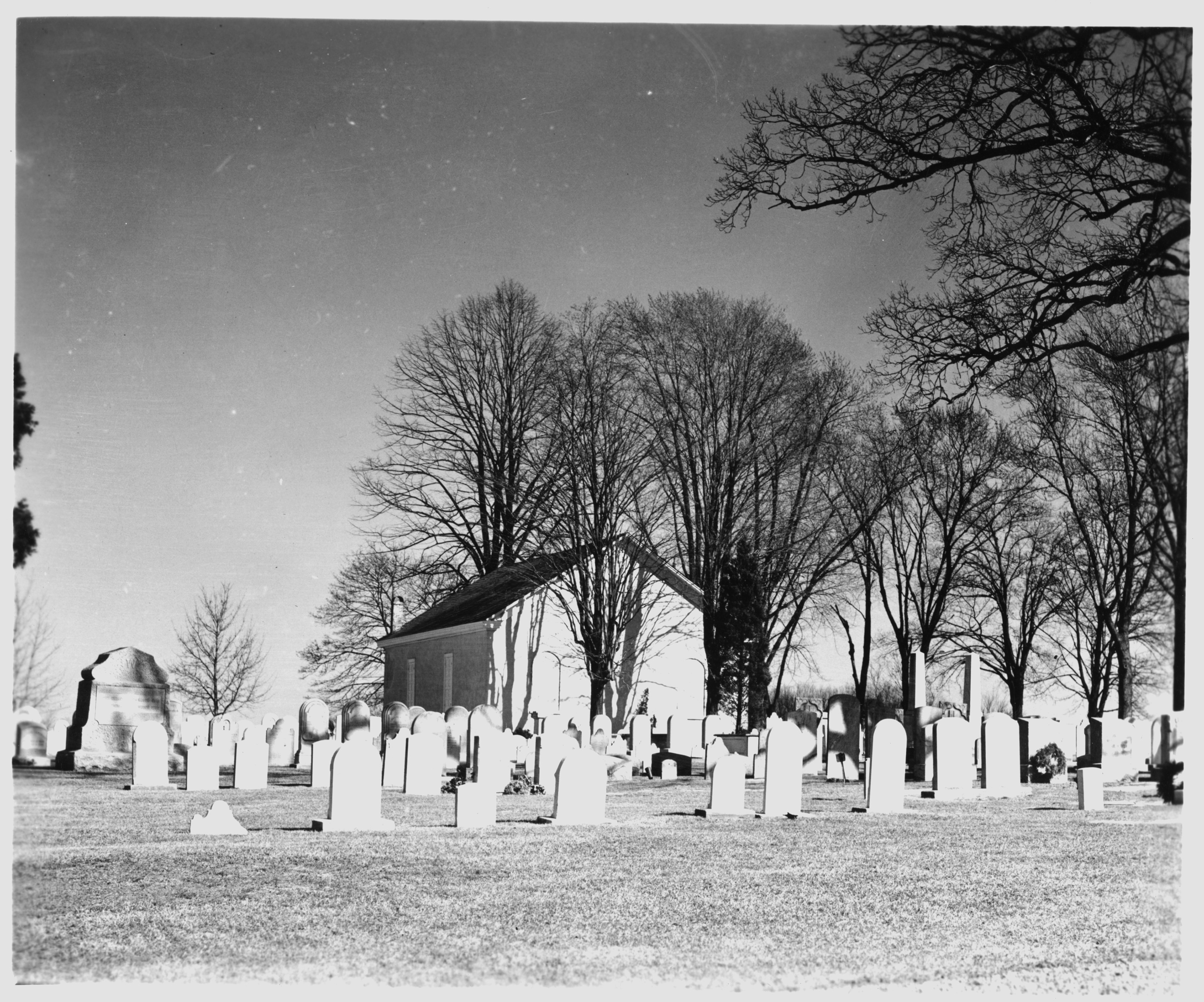
Old Leacock Presbyterian Church and Cemetery
