= Fertility, Pennsylvania =

Unincorporated community in Pennsylvania, US

- Unincorporated community
- Location within Pennsylvania Location within the United States
- Coordinates: 40°02′7″N 76°14′21″W
- Country: United States
- State: Pennsylvania
- County: Lancaster
- Township: East Lampeter
- Elevation: 308 ft (94 m)
- Time zone: UTC-5 (Eastern (EST))
  - Summer (DST): UTC-4 (EDT)
- ZIP codes: 17602
- GNIS feature ID: 1174716

Fertility is an unincorporated community located along Strasburg Pike, in East Lampeter Township in Lancaster County, Pennsylvania, United States.
