= Pequea Valley High School =

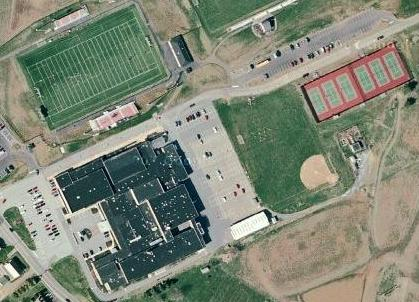
- USGS image of Pequea Valley High School

Location
- 4033 East Newport Road; Kinzers, Lancaster County, Pennsylvania 17535; United States
- Coordinates: 40.0207°N 76.0665°W

Information
- School type: Secondary
- School district: Pequea Valley School District
- Superintendent: Erik Orndorf
- Principal: Arlen Mummau
- Staff: 37.30 (FTE)
- Grades: 9th–12th
- Enrollment: 443 (2022–2023)
- Student to teacher ratio: 11.88
- Mascot: Braves
- Website: Pequea Valley High School
- Pequea Valley Braves athletic logo

Pequea Valley High School is the only secondary school in the Pequea Valley School District. It is located in Kinzers, Lancaster County, Pennsylvania, United States.

== Statistics ==
Attendance at Pequea Valley Senior High School during the 2005–2006 school year was 92.91%, compared with the 87.97% scored in the prior year. Students were 57.1% proficient in math and 73.4% proficient in reading.

In 2012, the school's varsity soccer team won the state title.
