= Strasburg Township, Pennsylvania =

Township in Pennsylvania, US

Coordinates: 39°57′00″N 76°10′29″W

- Township
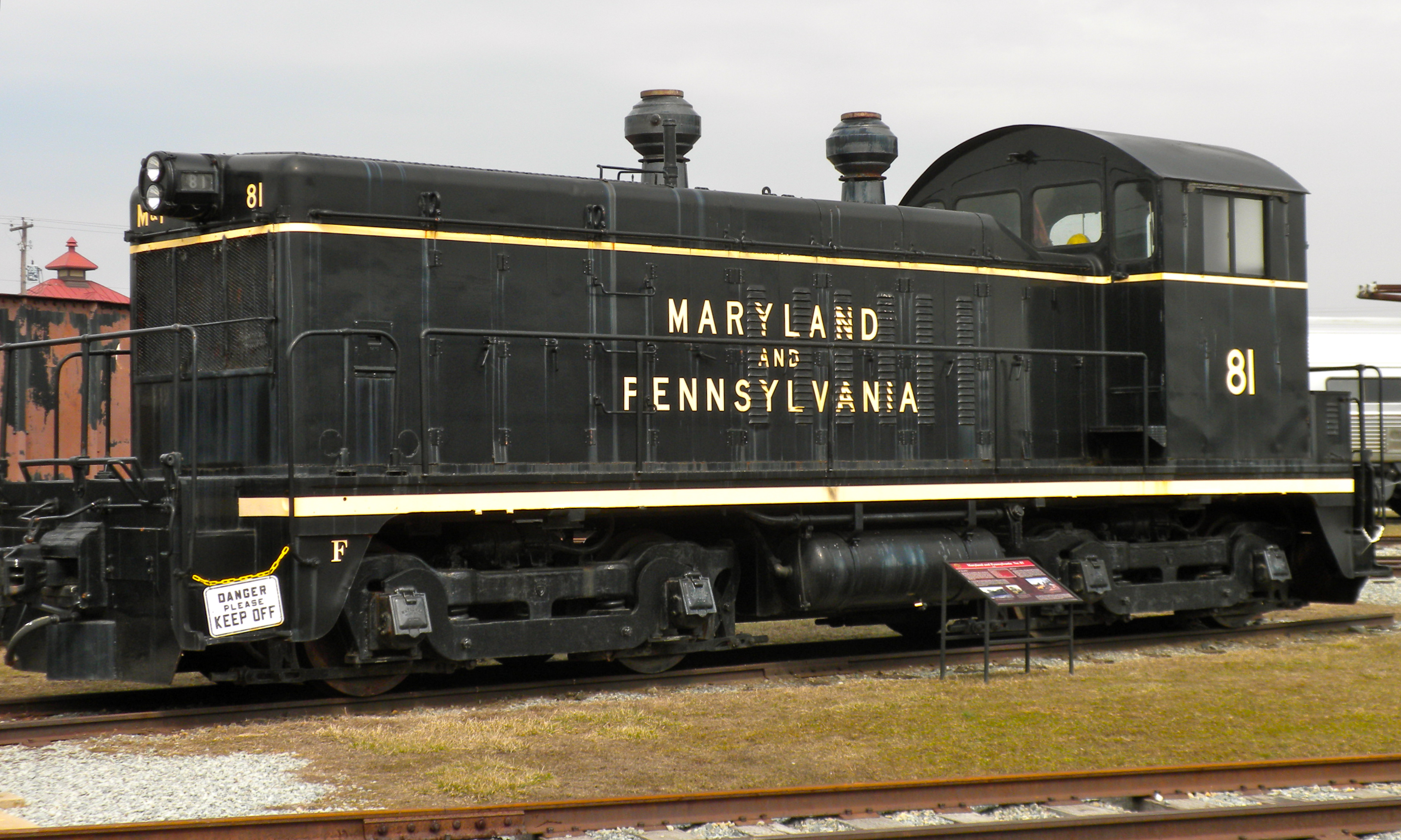
- Locomotive at the Railroad Museum of Pennsylvania

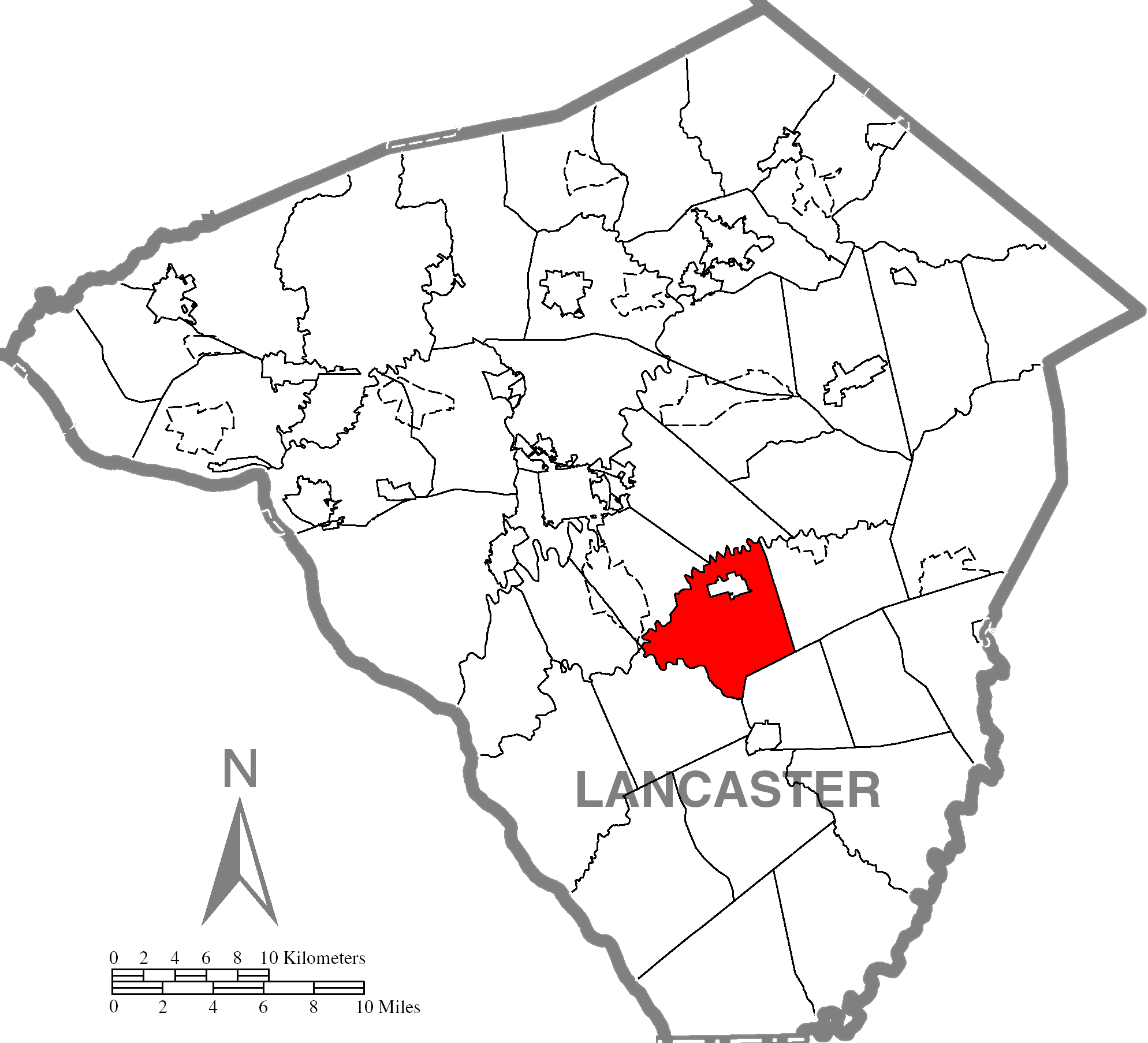
- Map of Lancaster County, Pennsylvania highlighting Strasburg Township

- Map of Lancaster County, Pennsylvania
- Country: United States
- State: Pennsylvania
- County: Lancaster
- Settled: 1712
- Incorporated: 1730

Government
  - Type: Board of Supervisors

Area
  - Total: 20.14 sq mi (52.16 km^{2})
  - Land: 19.98 sq mi (51.75 km^{2})
  - Water: 0.16 sq mi (0.41 km^{2})

Population (2020)
  - Total: 4,467 ▲
  - Estimate (2021): 4,466
  - Density: 214.0/sq mi (82.63/km^{2})
- Time zone: UTC-5 (Eastern (EST))
  - Summer (DST): UTC-4 (EDT)
- Area code: 717
- FIPS code: 42-071-74720
- Website: www.strasburgtownship.com

Strasburg Township is a township in south central Lancaster County, Pennsylvania, United States. The population was 4,467 at the 2020 census.

== Geography ==
According to the United States Census Bureau, the township has a total area of 20.0 square miles (51.9 km^{2}), of which 20.0 square miles (51.8 km^{2}) are land and 0.04 square miles (0.1 km^{2}), or 0.20%, are water. The township surrounds the borough of Strasburg, a separate municipality. Unincorporated communities in the township include Refton and Hessdale.

== Demographics ==
Historical population
Census	Pop.	Note	%±
2000	4,021		—
2010	4,182		4.0%
2020	4,467		6.8%
2021 (est.)	4,466		0.0%
U.S. Decennial Census

At the 2000 census there were 4,021 people, 1,275 households, and 1,071 families living in the township. The population density was 201.1 inhabitants per square mile (77.6/km^{2}). There were 1,295 housing units at an average density of 64.8 per square mile (25.0/km^{2}). The racial makeup of the township was 98.96% White, 0.20% African American, 0.02% Native American, 0.10% Asian, 0.05% Pacific Islander, 0.07% from other races, and 0.60% from two or more races. Hispanic or Latino of any race were 0.25%.

There were 1,275 households, 41.8% had children under the age of 18 living with them, 77.4% were married couples living together, 4.4% had a female householder with no husband present, and 16.0% were non-families. 13.8% of households were made up of individuals, and 6.6% were one person aged 65 or older. The average household size was 3.15 and the average family size was 3.50.

The age distribution was 32.8% under the age of 18, 8.7% from 18 to 24, 25.7% from 25 to 44, 23.4% from 45 to 64, and 9.4% 65 or older. The median age was 33 years. For every 100 females, there were 102.7 males. For every 100 females age 18 and over, there were 97.2 males.

The median household income was $55,750 and the median family income was $58,849. Males had a median income of $35,704 versus $25,030 for females. The per capita income for the township was $18,556. About 4.7% of families and 4.7% of the population were below the poverty line, including 4.6% of those under age 18 and 5.8% of those age 65 or over.
