= Dillerville, Pennsylvania =

Unincorporated community in Pennsylvania, US

- Unincorporated area
- Location within Pennsylvania Location within the United States
- Coordinates: 40°03′26″N 76°19′18″W
- Country: United States
- State: Pennsylvania
- County: Lancaster
- Time zone: UTC-5 (Eastern (EST))
  - Summer (DST): UTC-4 (EDT)

Dillerville or Dillersville is an extinct hamlet in Lancaster County, Pennsylvania, United States.

Dillerville was established between the Harrisburg and Manheim pikes, at the intersection of the Lancaster and Reading railroads.

It is sometimes called Dillerville, and sometimes called Dillersville. The USPS database uses the singular spelling for Dillerville Road, as does Mapquest's database. Searching on Google shows the singular spelling to be about six times as popular.

The Dillerville name lives on in the Conrail maintenance yard in Lancaster, a wetlands known as the Dillerville swamp, and in Dillerville Road.

According to an 1855 publication, the Pennsylvania Railroad, double-tracked, runs east from Dillerville 69 miles (111 km) to Philadelphia and west to Columbia; at Dillerville, there is a junction with the Harrisburg, Portsmouth, Mount Joy and Lancaster Railroad, which extends 36 miles (58 km) to Harrisburg.

An 1864 atlas of Lancaster County shows six property owners in Dillerville: Benjamin Herr, Henry Huber, Hy Holl, Patrick McLaughlin, Samuel Ruth, and Emil Shober. Lue E. Huber, age 42, died in Dillerville on April 16, 1893 and Viola Keith, age 1 year, on Mar 1, 1888 according to inscriptions on their headstones.

In the Lancaster County Historical Society Vol. 53, No. 3, p. 87 a list of teachers for the one-room schoolhouse is given as:

- In 1851-52 James Benson was teaching a group of 44 including the names Ruth Hall, McGrann, Schreiner, Huber, Smith, McGlaughlan, Blizzard, hackman, Swails, Graft and Getz. The school was referred to as No. 5 and was located "on the west side of Dillerville Lane opposite the lane that led to the Brennan Farm".
- About 1895, Harry R. Bassler
- about 1900, Miss Anna Eby
- 1903, Miss Ada Burkholder (Shuman)
- 1904, Mr. Evans
- 1905, Dr. J.G. Hess
- 1906, C. H. Martin (Treasurer of the historical society) with fifty-five pupils in eight grades
- 1907, John Matter
- Later, and for twenty years, it was occupied as a dwelling by Frank Heisler.

In 1999, students from the Lancaster Academy planted more than 500 wetland plants, including buttonbush, soft-stem bullrush, water iris and silky dogwood in an 8-acre (32,000 m^{2}) wetland near Red Rose Commons, known as the Dillerville Swamp.

== Geography ==
Dillersville is located at 40°3′26″N 76°19′18″W (40.057222,-76.321667), and is 385 feet (117 m) above mean sea level.
