= Pequea Valley School District =

School district in Pennsylvania

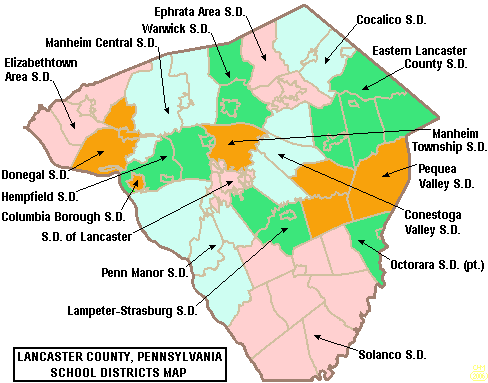

Location
- Lancaster County; Pennsylvania United States

District information
- Motto: "Where each learner counts"
- Grades: K-12
- Superintendent: Erik Orndorff
- Budget: $32,994,25

Students and staff
- Students: 1,589
- Teachers: 127
- Staff: 203

Other information
- Website: Pequea Valley School District

The Pequea Valley School District is a school district in Lancaster County, Pennsylvania, United States. In enrolls 1,589 students in four schools, with 127 teachers. It is a member of Lancaster-Lebanon Intermediate Unit (IU) 13.

== District schools ==
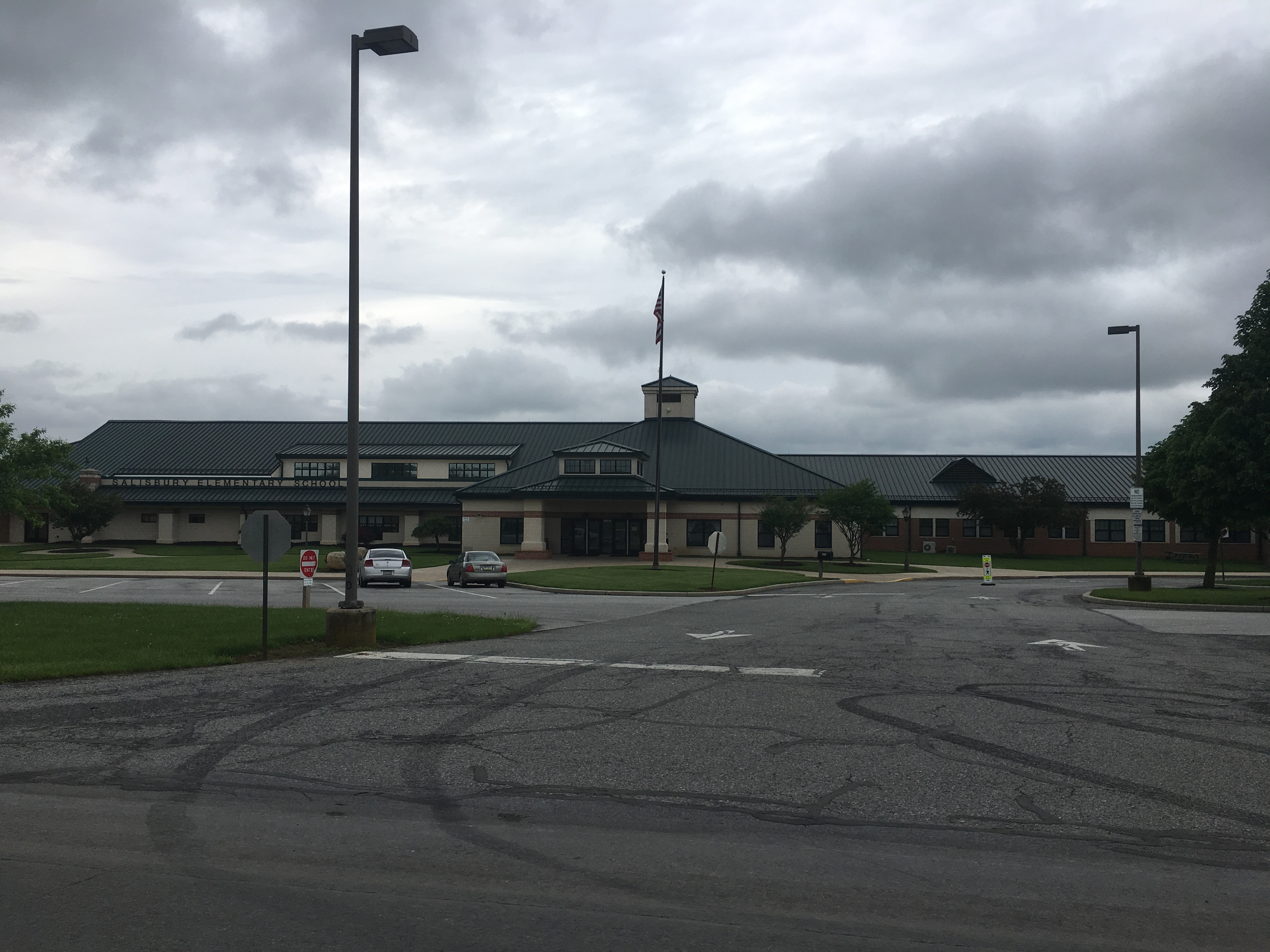
Salisbury Elementary School, located on 422 School Lane Rd in Gap

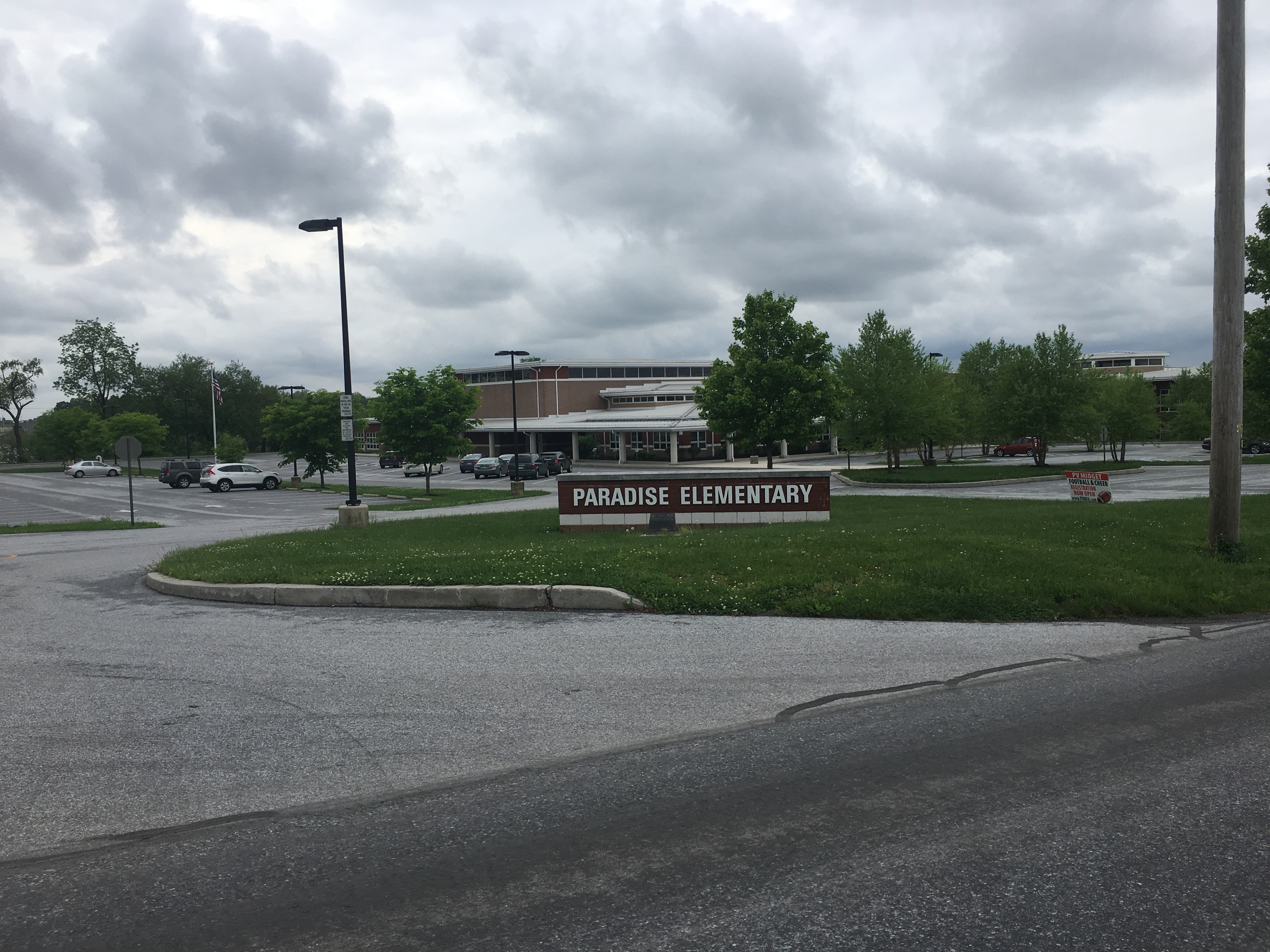
Paradise Elementary, located on 20 N Belmont Rd in Paradise

=== Paradise Elementary School ===
Paradise Elementary School in Paradise, Pennsylvania is a K-6 facility in the Pequea Valley School District. In 2009, a new building was constructed adjacent to the old building. This new facility has features specifically added to try to limit resource consumption, such as auto-dimming lights and water fountains that use collected rainwater. There have been talks of a new building project that would increase the number of classrooms to accommodate the many new students in the area.

=== Salisbury Elementary School ===
Salisbury Elementary School is a K-6 facility in the Pequea Valley School District. It houses around 360 students. Attendance at Salisbury Elementary School in Gap, Pennsylvania during the 2005–2006 school year was 96.11%, essentially the same as the 96.04% scored in the prior year. Students were 81.8% proficient in math, and 72.9% proficient in reading.

=== Pequea Valley Intermediate School ===
The PV Intermediate school is a facility for 7-8 grade students. There are approximately 255 attending. Attendance at Pequea Valley Intermediate School in Kinzers, Pennsylvania during the 2005–2006 school year was 96.10%, essentially the same as the 95.54% scored in the prior year. Students were 71.1% proficient in math, and 69.5% proficient in reading.

=== Pequea Valley High School ===
Attendance at Pequea Valley High School in Kinzers, Pennsylvania during the 2005–2006 school year was 92.91%, higher than the 87.97% scored in the prior year. Students were 57.1% proficient in math, and 73.4% proficient in reading.

There were plans to retire both the intermediate school building and senior high school building for a new school building in their place, housing grades 7–12. The building was expected to be finished by 2025.

== Sports ==
Pequea Valley High School's varsity soccer team won the 2012 State Championship title.

== See also ==
- Official website
