= Farmersville, Pennsylvania =

Unincorporated community in Pennsylvania, US

- Census-designated place
- Location in Pennsylvania Location in the United States
- Coordinates: 40°07′39″N 76°09′55″W
- Country: United States
- State: Pennsylvania
- County: Lancaster
- Township: West Earl

Area
  - Total: 2.47 sq mi (6.40 km^{2})
  - Land: 2.47 sq mi (6.40 km^{2})
  - Water: 0 sq mi (0.00 km^{2})
- Elevation: 370 ft (110 m)

Population (2020)
  - Total: 1,051
  - Density: 425.6/sq mi (164.34/km^{2})
- Time zone: UTC-5 (Eastern (EST))
  - Summer (DST): UTC-4 (EDT)
- FIPS code: 2584457
- Website: 1174624

Farmersville is a rural Mennonite settlement and a census-designated place (CDP) in West Earl Township, Pennsylvania, United States. As of the 2010 census the population was 991.

== Geography ==
Farmersville is in northeastern Lancaster County, in the eastern part of West Earl Township. It is 5 miles (8 km) south of the borough of Ephrata and 11 miles (18 km) northeast of Lancaster, the county seat. Farmersville is near no major roads, with the town center being at the intersection of North Farmersville Road and East Farmersville Road. The Farmersville CDP includes the neighborhood of Fairmount to the east, at the intersection of East Farmersville Road and Katze Boucle Weeg (Cat's Back Road).

According to the U.S. Census Bureau, the Farmersville CDP has a total area of 2.5 square miles (6.4 km^{2}), of which 0.004 square miles (0.01 km^{2}), or 0.18%, are water. The community drains north to the Conestoga River and south to Groff Creek, a tributary of the Conestoga. The entire area is part of the Susquehanna River watershed.

Every Tuesday, Farmersville has a weekly auction.

== Demographics ==
Historical population
Census	Pop.	Note	%±
2020	1,051		—
U.S. Decennial Census

== Notable person ==
- Floyd Landis, former professional cyclist; born in Farmersville
