= Lancaster County, Pennsylvania =

County in Pennsylvania, United States

- County
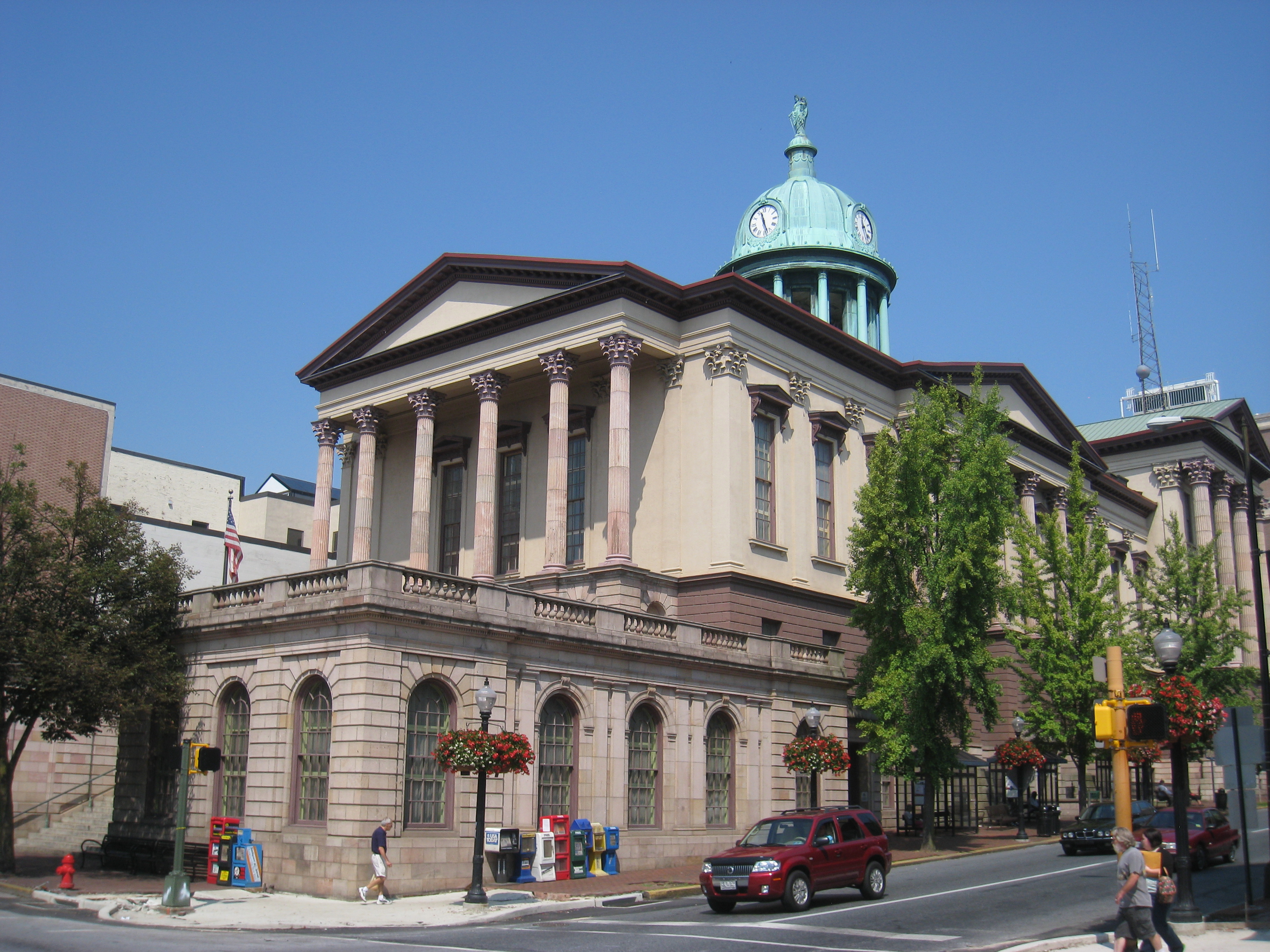
- Lancaster County Courthouse in Lancaster pictured, August 2009

- Flag Seal

- Location within the U.S. state of Pennsylvania
- Coordinates: 40°02′N 76°15′W
- Country: United States
- State: Pennsylvania
- Founded: May 10, 1729
- Named for: Lancaster, England
- Seat: Lancaster
- Largest city: Lancaster

Area
  - Total: 984 sq mi (2,550 km^{2})
  - Land: 944 sq mi (2,440 km^{2})
  - Water: 40 sq mi (100 km^{2}) 4.1%

Population (2020)
  - Total: 552,984
  - Estimate (2025): 563,159 ▲
  - Density: 597/sq mi (231/km^{2})
- Time zone: UTC−5 (Eastern)
  - Summer (DST): UTC−4 (EDT)
- Congressional district: 11th
- Website: co.lancaster.pa.us

Lancaster County (/ˈlæŋ.kɪs.tər/; Pennsylvania German: Lengeschder Kaundi), sometimes nicknamed the Garden Spot of America or Pennsylvania Dutch Country, is a county in the Commonwealth of Pennsylvania, United States.

As of the 2020 census, the population was 552,984, making it Pennsylvania's sixth-most populous county. Its county seat is also Lancaster. Lancaster County comprises the Lancaster metropolitan statistical area. Lancaster County is a tourist destination with its Amish community being a major attraction. The ancestors of the Amish began to immigrate to colonial Pennsylvania in the early 18th century to take advantage of the religious freedom offered by William Penn, as well as the area's rich soil and mild climate. They were joined by French Huguenots fleeing the religious persecution of Louis XIV. There were also significant numbers of English, Welsh and Ulster Scots (also known as the Scotch-Irish in the colonies). The county is part of the South Central region of the commonwealth. (Note: Includes Lancaster, York, Berks, Dauphin, Cumberland, Franklin, Lebanon, Adams and Perry Counties)

== History ==
The area that became Lancaster County was part of William Penn's 1681 charter. John Kennerly received the first recorded deed from Penn in 1691. Although Matthias Kreider was said to have been in the area as early as 1691, there is no evidence that any Europeans settled in Lancaster County before 1710.

Lancaster County was part of Chester County, Pennsylvania, until May 10, 1729, when it was organized as the colony's fourth county. It was named after the city of Lancaster in the county of Lancashire in England, the native home of John Wright, an early settler. As settlement increased, six other counties were subsequently formed from territory directly taken, in all or in part, from Lancaster County: Berks (1752), Cumberland (1750), Dauphin (1785), Lebanon (1813), Northumberland (1772), and York (1749).

=== Indigenous peoples ===
Indigenous peoples had occupied the areas along the waterways for thousands of years, and established varying cultures. Historic Native American tribes in the area at the time of European encounter included the Shawnee, Susquehannock, Gawanese, Lenape (or Delaware), and Nanticoke peoples, who were from different language families and had distinct cultures.

Among the earliest recorded inhabitants of the Susquehanna River valley were the Iroquoian-speaking Susquehannock, whose name was derived from the Lenape term for "Oyster River People". (The Lenape spoke an Algonquian language.) The English called them the Conestoga, after the name of their principal village, Gan'ochs'a'go'jat'ga ("Roof-place" or "town"), anglicized as "Conestoga." Other places occupied by the Susquehannock were Ka'ot'sch'ie'ra ("Place-crawfish"), where present-day Chickisalunga developed, and Gasch'guch'sa ("Great-fall-in-river"), now called Conewago Falls, Lancaster County.

Other Native tribes, as well as early European settlers, considered the Susquehannock a mighty nation, experts in war and trade. They were beaten only by the combined power of the Five Nation Iroquois Confederacy, after colonial Maryland withdrew its support. After 1675, the Susquehannock were totally absorbed by the Iroquois. A handful were settled at "New Conestoga," located along the south bank of the Conestoga River in Conestoga Township of the county. They helped staff an Iroquois consulate to the English in Maryland and Virginia (and later, Pennsylvania). By the 1720s, the colonists considered the Conestoga Indians as a "civilized" or "friendly tribe," having been converted in large part to Christianity, speaking English as a second language, making brooms and baskets for sale, and naming children after their favorite neighbors.

The outbreak of Pontiac's War in the summer of 1763, coupled with the ineffective policies of the provincial government, aroused widespread settler suspicion and hatred against all Indians in the frontier counties, without distinguishing among hostile and friendly peoples. On December 14, 1763, the Paxton Boys, led by Matthew Smith and Capt. Lazarus Stewart, attacked Conestoga, killing the six Indians present, and burning all the houses. Officials sheltered the tribe's fourteen survivors in protective custody in the county jail, but the Paxton Boys returned on December 27, broke into the jail, and massacred the remaining natives. The lack of effective government control and widespread sympathy in the frontier counties for the murderers meant they were never discovered or brought to justice.

=== Maryland-Pennsylvania boundary dispute ===
Pennsylvania had a longstanding dispute with Maryland about the southern border of the province and Lancaster County. Nine years of armed clashes accompanied the Maryland-Pennsylvania boundary dispute, which began soon after the 1730 establishment of Wright's Ferry across the Susquehanna River. Lord Baltimore believed that his grant to Maryland extended to the 40th parallel. This was about halfway between present-day Lancaster and the town of Willow Street, Pennsylvania. This line of demarcation would have resulted in Philadelphia being included in Maryland.

New settlers began to cross the Susquehanna. In 1730, the Wright's Ferry services were licensed and officially begun. Starting in mid-1730, Thomas Cresap, acting as an agent of Lord Baltimore, began confiscating the newly settled farms near present-day Peach Bottom and Columbia, Pennsylvania, which at the time this was not named but was later called Wright's Ferry. Believing he controlled this land under his grant, Lord Baltimore wanted the income from the lands. He believed he had a defensible claim established on the west bank of the Susquehanna River since 1721, and that his demesne and grant extended to forty degrees north. If he allowed Pennsylvanians to settle his lands without reacting, he believed, their squatting would constitute a counter claim.

Cresap established a second ferry in the upper Conejohela downriver from John Wright's, near Peach Bottom. He demanded that settlers either move out or pay Maryland for the right-bank lands. Settlers believed they already had rights to these under Pennsylvania grants. Cresap drove off settlers by vandalizing farms and killing livestock; he pushed out settlers from southern York and Lancaster counties. He gave the abandoned lands to his followers. If a follower was arrested by Lancaster authorities, the Marylanders would break him out of the lockup.

Lord Baltimore negotiated a compromise in 1733, but Cresap ignored it and continued his raids. A deputy was sent to arrest him in 1734, and Cresap killed him at the door. The Pennsylvania governor demanded that Maryland arrest Cresap for murder; the Maryland governor instead commissioned him as a captain in the militia. In 1736, Cresap was finally arrested; he was jailed until 1737 when the King intervened. In 1750, a court decided that, by failing to develop the land with settlers, Lord Baltimore had forfeited his rights to a twenty-mile (32 km) swath of land. In 1767, a new Pennsylvania-Maryland border was officially established by the Mason–Dixon line.

=== Diversity of settlers ===
Lithograph of Thaddeus Stevens

The names of the original Lancaster County townships reflect the diverse national origins of settlers in the new county: two had Welsh names (Caernarvon and Lampeter), three had Native American names (Cocalico, Conestoga and Peshtank or Paxton), six were English (Warwick, Lancaster, Martic, Sadsbury, Salisbury and Hempfield); four were Irish (Donegal, Drumore, Derry, and Leacock), reflecting mostly Scots-Irish (or Ulster Scots) from Ulster, a province in the north of Ireland; Manheim was German, Lebanon came from the Bible, a basis of all the European cultures; and Earl was a translation of the German surname of Graf or Groff.

=== 19th-century statesmen ===
Lancaster County's native son James Buchanan, a Democrat, was elected as the 15th President of the United States in 1856, the first Pennsylvania native to hold the presidency. His home Wheatland is now operated as a house museum in Lancaster.

Thaddeus Stevens, the noted Radical Republican, represented Lancaster County in the United States House of Representatives from 1849 to 1853 and from 1859 until his death in 1868. Stevens left a $50,000 (~$1,000,000 in 2025) bequest to establish an orphanage. This property eventually was developed as the state-owned Thaddeus Stevens College of Technology. Stevens and Buchanan were both buried in Lancaster.

=== Slavery and the Christiana incident ===
Pennsylvania passed its gradual abolition law in 1780. The law, which freed the children of duly registered enslaved women at the age of twenty-eight, was a compromise between anti-slavery conviction and respect for white property rights. By the time the U.S. Congress passed the Fugitive Slave Law of 1850, Pennsylvania was effectively a free state, although it did not formally abolish slavery completely until the ratification of the Thirteenth Amendment. It did, however, pass a personal liberty law in 1847 that made it difficult for southerners to recover any enslaved persons who made their way into Pennsylvania.

Lying just north of the Mason–Dixon line and bordered by the Susquehanna River, which had been a traditional route from the Chesapeake Bay watershed into the heart of what became Pennsylvania, Lancaster County was a significant destination of the Underground Railroad in the antebellum years. Many residents of German descent opposed slavery and cooperated in aiding fugitive slaves. Local Lancaster County resident Charles Spotts found 17 stations. They included hiding places with trap doors, hidden vaults, a cave, and one with a brick tunnel leading to Octoraro Creek, a tributary of the Susquehanna.

As a wealthy Maryland wheat farmer, Edward Gorsuch had manumitted several slaves in their 20s. He allowed his slaves to work for cash elsewhere during the slow season. Upon finding some of his wheat missing, he thought his slaves had sold it to a local farmer. His slaves Noah Buley, Nelson Ford, George Ford, and Joshua Hammond, fearing his bad temper, fled across the Mason–Dixon line to the farm of William Parker, a mulatto free man and abolitionist who lived in Christiana, Pennsylvania. Parker, 29, was a member of the Lancaster Black Self-Protection Society and known to use violence to defend himself and the fugitive slaves who sought refuge in the area.

Gorsuch obtained four warrants and organized four parties, which set out separately with federal marshals to recover his property—the four slaves. He was killed and others were wounded. While Gorsuch was legally entitled to recover his slaves under the Fugitive Slave Act, it is not clear who precipitated the violence. The incident was variously called the "Christiana Riot", "Christiana Resistance", the "Christiana Outrage", and the "Christiana Tragedy". The Pennsylvania Anti-Slavery Society helped provide defense for the suspects charged in the case.

The event frightened slaveholders, as black men not only fought back but prevailed. Some feared this would inspire enslaved blacks and encourage rebelliousness. The case was prosecuted in U.S. District Court in Philadelphia under the Fugitive Slave Act, which required citizens to cooperate in the capture and return of fugitive slaves. The disturbance increased regional and racial tensions. In the North, it added to the push to abolish slavery.

In September 1851, the grand jury returned a "true bill" (indictment) against 38 suspects, who were held at Moyamensing Prison in Philadelphia, awaiting trial. U.S. District Judge Robert Cooper Grier ruled that the men could be tried for treason.

The only person actually tried was Castner Hanway, a European-American man. On November 15, 1851, he was tried for liberating slaves taken into custody by U.S. Marshal Kline, as well as for resisting arrest, conspiracy, and treason. Hanway's responsibility for the violent events was unclear. He was reported as one of the first on the scene where Gorsuch and others of his party were attacked, and he and his horse provided cover for Dickerson Gorsuch and Dr. Pearce, who were wounded. The jury deliberated 15 minutes before returning a Not Guilty. Among the five defense lawyers, recruited by the Pennsylvania Anti-Slavery Society, was U.S. Congressman Thaddeus Stevens, who had practiced law in Lancaster County since at least 1838.

=== Religious history ===
The oldest surviving dwelling of European settlers in the county is that of Mennonite Bishop Hans Herr, built in 1719. In 1989, Donald Kraybill counted 37 distinct religious bodies/organizations, with 289 congregations and 41,600 baptized members, among the plain sects who are descendants of the Anabaptist Mennonite immigrants to Lancaster County. The Mennonite Central Committee in Akron supports relief in disasters and provides manpower and material to local organizations in relief efforts.

The town of Lititz was originally planned as a closed community, founded early in the 1740s by members of the Moravian Church. The town eventually grew and welcomed its neighbors. The Moravian Church established Linden Hall School for Girls in 1746; it is one of the earliest educational institutions in continuous operation in the United States.

In addition to the Ephrata Cloister, the United Brethren in Christ and the Evangelical United Brethren (EUB) trace their beginnings to a 1767 meeting at the Isaac Long barn, near the hamlet of Oregon, in West Lampeter Township. The EUB, a German Methodist church, merged in 1968 with the traditionally English Methodist Episcopal Church to become the United Methodist Church.

The first Jewish resident was Isaac Miranda, from the Sephardic Jewish community of London, who owned property before the town and county were organized in 1730. Ten years later several Jewish families had settled in the town; on February 3, 1747, a deed to Isaac Nunus Ricus (Henriques) and Joseph Simon was recorded, conveying 0.5 acres (0.20 ha) of land "in trust for the society of Jews settled in and about Lancaster," to be used as a place of burial. This cemetery is still used by Congregation Shaarai Shomayim; it is considered the nation's fourth-oldest Jewish cemetery.

As of 2010, Lancaster County is home to three synagogues: the Orthodox Degel Israel; the Conservative Beth El; and the Reform Shaarai Shomayim. In 2003 Rabbi Elazar Green & Shira Green founded the Chabad Jewish Enrichment Center, a branch of the Chabad Lubavitch movement, that focuses on serving the Jewish students of Franklin and Marshall College, as well serving the general community with specific religious services. The Lancaster Mikvah Association runs a mikveh on Degel Israel's property. Central PA Kosher Stand is operated at Dutch Wonderland, a seasonal amusement park.

This area was also settled by French Huguenots, who had fled to England and then the colonies in the late 1600s and early 1700s to escape Catholic persecution in France. Isaac LeFèvre and a group of other Huguenots settled in the Pequea Creek area.

=== Inventions ===
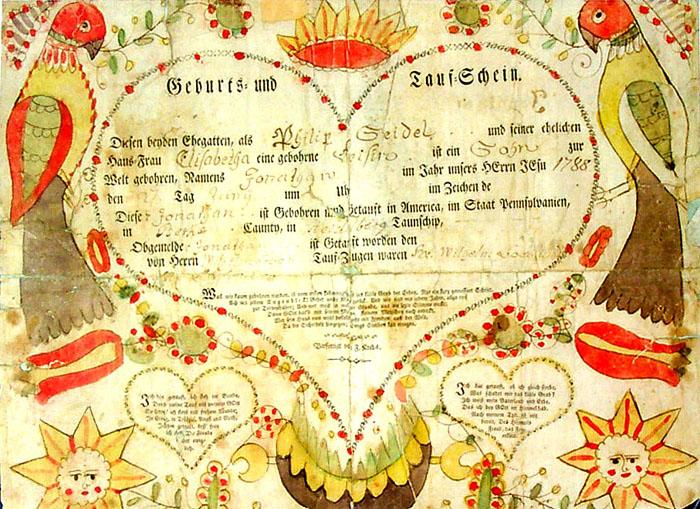
A Pennsylvania Dutch Fraktur baptismal certificate from 1788

- Fraktur, the artistic and elaborate 18th- century and 19th-century hand-illustrated folk art inspired by German blackface type, originated at Johann Conrad Beissel's cloister of German Seventh Day Baptists in Ephrata.
- The first battery-powered watch, the Hamilton Electric 500, was released in 1957 by the Hamilton Watch Company.
- The Pennsylvania Long Rifle, otherwise known as the "Kentucky" (Long) Rifle.
- The Conestoga wagon, which started the US practice of opposing vehicles passing each other to the right.
- The Stogie cigar "Stogie" is shortened from "Conestoga".
- The Amish quilt, a highly utilitarian art form, dates from 1849 in Lancaster County.

== Geography ==
According to the U.S. Census Bureau, the county has a total area of 984 square miles (2,550 km^{2}), of which 944 square miles (2,440 km^{2}) is land and 40 square miles (100 km^{2}) (4.1%) is water.

Lancaster is bordered by Lebanon County to the north; Berks County to the northeast; Chester County to the east; Cecil County, Maryland, to the south; Harford County, Maryland, to the southwest; York County, Pennsylvania, to the west; and Dauphin County to the northwest.

=== Climate ===
Most of the county has a hot-summer humid continental climate (Dfa) and the hardiness zones are 6b and 7a. The most recent temperature averages show areas along the Susquehanna River and in the lower Conestoga Valley to have a humid subtropical climate (Cfa.)

Climate data for Lancaster, Pennsylvania (1991–2020 normals, extremes 1949–present)
Month	Jan	Feb	Mar	Apr	May	Jun	Jul	Aug	Sep	Oct	Nov	Dec	Year
Record high °F (°C)	70 (21)	82 (28)	88 (31)	93 (34)	99 (37)	97 (36)	103 (39)	101 (38)	99 (37)	93 (34)	86 (30)	76 (24)	103 (39)
Mean daily maximum °F (°C)	39.9 (4.4)	42.8 (6.0)	52.0 (11.1)	64.6 (18.1)	74.5 (23.6)	82.7 (28.2)	87.0 (30.6)	85.1 (29.5)	78.2 (25.7)	66.4 (19.1)	54.8 (12.7)	44.4 (6.9)	64.4 (18.0)
Daily mean °F (°C)	31.0 (−0.6)	33.2 (0.7)	41.4 (5.2)	52.6 (11.4)	62.4 (16.9)	71.2 (21.8)	75.9 (24.4)	74.1 (23.4)	66.9 (19.4)	55.1 (12.8)	44.4 (6.9)	35.7 (2.1)	53.7 (12.1)
Mean daily minimum °F (°C)	22.2 (−5.4)	23.6 (−4.7)	30.9 (−0.6)	40.5 (4.7)	50.4 (10.2)	59.7 (15.4)	64.7 (18.2)	63.0 (17.2)	55.6 (13.1)	43.7 (6.5)	34.0 (1.1)	27.1 (−2.7)	42.9 (6.1)
Record low °F (°C)	−16 (−27)	−9 (−23)	−2 (−19)	16 (−9)	21 (−6)	33 (1)	46 (8)	37 (3)	34 (1)	23 (−5)	11 (−12)	−3 (−19)	−16 (−27)
Average precipitation inches (mm)	3.01 (76)	2.52 (64)	3.50 (89)	3.54 (90)	3.65 (93)	4.09 (104)	4.51 (115)	3.60 (91)	4.82 (122)	4.18 (106)	3.26 (83)	3.47 (88)	44.15 (1,121)
Average snowfall inches (cm)	6.1 (15)	7.4 (19)	3.4 (8.6)	0.2 (0.51)	0.0 (0.0)	0.0 (0.0)	0.0 (0.0)	0.0 (0.0)	0.0 (0.0)	0.3 (0.76)	0.6 (1.5)	3.4 (8.6)	21.4 (54)
Average precipitation days (≥ 0.01 in)	10.0	8.8	10.5	10.9	12.7	11.1	10.3	9.7	9.5	9.9	9.6	10.9	123.9
Average snowy days (≥ 0.1 in)	2.7	2.7	1.2	0.1	0.0	0.0	0.0	0.0	0.0	0.0	0.3	1.1	8.1
Source: NOAA

=== Watersheds ===
Almost all of Lancaster County is in the Chesapeake Bay drainage basin, via the Susquehanna River watershed (the exception is a small unnamed tributary of the West Branch of Brandywine Creek that rises in eastern Salisbury Township and is part of the Delaware River watershed). The major streams in the county (with percent area drained) are: Conestoga River and Little Conestoga Creek (31.42%); Pequea Creek (15.02%); Chiques Creek (or Chickies Creek, 12.07%); Cocalico Creek (11.25%); Octoraro Creek (10.74%); and Conowingo Creek (3.73%).

=== Protected areas ===
Lancaster County is home to Susquehannock State Park, located on 224 acres (91 ha) overlooking the Susquehanna River in Drumore Township. One of the three tracts comprising William Penn State Forest, the 10-acre (4.0 ha) Cornwall fire tower site, is located in northern Penn Township near the Lebanon County border. The site, with its 1923 fire tower, was acquired by the state in January 1935.

There are six Pennsylvania State Game Lands for hunting, trapping, and fishing located in Lancaster County. They are numbers (with location and area): 46 (near Hopeland, 5,035 acres (2,038 ha)), 52 (near Morgantown, 1,447 acres (586 ha)), 136 (near Kirkwood, 91 acres (37 ha)), 156 (near Poplar Grove, 4,537 acres (1,836 ha)), 220 (near Reinholds, 96 acres (39 ha)), and 288 (near Martic Forge, 89 acres (36 ha)).

The county's southern portion has some protected serpentine barrens, a rare ecosystem where toxic metals in the soil inhibit plant growth, resulting in the formation of natural grassland and savanna. These barrens include the New Texas Serpentine Barrens, privately owned land managed by The Nature Conservancy, and Rock Springs Nature Preserve, a publicly accessible preserve with hiking trails owned and managed by the Lancaster County Conservancy.

Lancaster County leads the nation in farmland preservation. Organizations such as the Lancaster Farmland Trust, the Lancaster County Agricultural Preservation Board, and multiple municipalities work in partnership with landowners to preserve their farms and way of life for future generations by placing a conservation easement on their property. A conservation easement restricts real estate development, commercial and industrial uses, and certain other activities on the land that are mutually agreed upon by the grantees and the property owner. After ceding their development rights, landowners continue to manage and own their properties and may receive significant tax breaks. The conservation easement ensures that the land will remain available for agricultural use forever. Lancaster Farmland Trust is a private, non-profit organization that works closely with the vast Amish and Plain-Sect communities of Lancaster County to ensure their farms will retain their agricultural value. Together with the Lancaster County Agricultural Preserve Board, the county has preserved more than 100,000 acres (40,000 ha) of preserved farmland in the county—a first in the nation.

=== Seismicity ===
Lancaster County lies on the general track of the Appalachian Mountains. As a result, residual seismic activity from ancient faulting occasionally produces minor earthquakes of magnitude 3 to 4. On December 27, 2008, a 3.3 magnitude earthquake was widely felt in the Susquehanna Valley but caused no damage to structures.

=== Flora and fauna ===
The bog turtle was first discovered and identified in Lancaster County by botanist Gotthilf Heinrich Ernst Muhlenberg, who discovered the turtle species while surveying the area's flora. The species was named Muhlenberg's tortoise in 1801, but renamed bog turtle, its present common name, in 1956.

== Demographics ==
Historical population
Census	Pop.	Note	%±
1790	36,081		—
1800	43,403		20.3%
1810	53,927		24.2%
1820	68,336		26.7%
1830	76,631		12.1%
1840	84,203		9.9%
1850	98,944		17.5%
1860	116,314		17.6%
1870	121,340		4.3%
1880	139,447		14.9%
1890	149,095		6.9%
1900	159,241		6.8%
1910	167,029		4.9%
1920	173,797		4.1%
1930	196,882		13.3%
1940	212,504		7.9%
1950	234,717		10.5%
1960	278,359		18.6%
1970	319,693		14.8%
1980	362,346		13.3%
1990	422,822		16.7%
2000	470,658		11.3%
2010	519,445		10.4%
2020	552,984		6.5%
2025 (est.)	563,159	▲	1.8%
U.S. Decennial Census; 1790–1960 1900–90; 1990–2000 2010 2020 2025

=== Racial and ethnic composition ===
Lancaster County, Pennsylvania – Racial and ethnic composition Note: the US Census treats Hispanic/Latino as an ethnic category. This table excludes Latinos from the racial categories and assigns them to a separate category. Hispanics/Latinos may be of any race.
Race / Ethnicity (NH = Non-Hispanic)	Pop 1980	Pop 1990	Pop 2000	Pop 2010	Pop 2020	% 1980	% 1990	% 2000	% 2010	% 2020
White alone (NH)	343,408	392,898	420,366	440,969	440,613	94.77%	92.92%	89.31%	84.89%	79.68%
Black or African American alone (NH)	6,741	9,147	11,837	16,087	19,536	1.86%	2.16%	2.51%	3.10%	3.53%
Native American or Alaska Native alone (NH)	279	441	490	658	522	0.08%	0.10%	0.10%	0.13%	0.09%
Asian alone (NH)	2,186	4,533	6,723	9,726	13,939	0.60%	1.07%	1.43%	1.87%	2.52%
Native Hawaiian or Pacific Islander alone (NH)	x	x	110	108	110	x	x	0.02%	0.02%	0.02%
Other race alone (NH)	628	164	390	448	1,922	0.17%	0.04%	0.08%	0.09%	0.35%
Mixed race or Multiracial (NH)	x	x	4,000	6,519	15,171	x	x	0.85%	1.25%	2.74%
Hispanic or Latino (any race)	9,104	15,639	26,742	44,930	61,171	2.51%	3.70%	5.68%	8.65%	11.06%
Total	362,346	422,822	470,658	519,445	552,984	100.00%	100.00%	100.00%	100.00%	100.00%

A chart of the population growth as a percentage of the prior decennial census shows the growth rate of Lancaster County population (dark blue) lagged the growth rate of the U.S. population (magenta) until the second half of the 20th century.

=== 2020 census ===
As of the 2020 census, the county had a population of 552,984. The median age was 39.3 years. 23.1% of residents were under the age of 18 and 19.2% of residents were 65 years of age or older. For every 100 females there were 95.3 males, and for every 100 females age 18 and over there were 92.5 males age 18 and over.

The racial makeup of the county was 81.9% White, 4.0% Black or African American, 0.2% American Indian and Alaska Native, 2.6% Asian, <0.1% Native Hawaiian and Pacific Islander, 4.9% from some other race, and 6.3% from two or more races. Hispanic or Latino residents of any race comprised 11.1% of the population.

72.1% of residents lived in urban areas, while 27.9% lived in rural areas.

There were 206,467 households in the county, of which 29.9% had children under the age of 18 living in them. Of all households, 54.6% were married-couple households, 15.4% were households with a male householder and no spouse or partner present, and 23.5% were households with a female householder and no spouse or partner present. About 24.6% of all households were made up of individuals and 11.5% had someone living alone who was 65 years of age or older.

There were 216,502 housing units, of which 4.6% were vacant. Among occupied housing units, 67.3% were owner-occupied and 32.7% were renter-occupied. The homeowner vacancy rate was 0.9% and the rental vacancy rate was 5.0%.

=== 2010 census ===
As of the 2010 census, there were 519,445 people. The population density was 561 people per square mile (217 people/km^{2}). There were 193,602 households. Of that number 135,401 (69.9%) were families. Of those families, 120,112 (88.7%) had children under the age of 18. There were 202,952 housing units at an average density of 215 per square mile (83/km^{2}). The average household size was 2.62 and the average family size was 3.13.

In the county, the population was spread out, with 24.8% under the age of 18 and 15.0% who were 65 years of age or older. The median age was 38.2 years. For every 100 females, there were 95.10 males. For every 100 females age 18 and over, there were 91.60 males.

5.58% of the population and 8.37% of the children aged 5–17 reported speaking Pennsylvania Dutch, German, or Dutch at home, while a further 4.97% of the population spoke Spanish. 39.8% were of German, 11.8% United States or American, 7.2% Irish and 5.7% English ancestry.

=== Plain Anabaptist (Amish) groups ===
Lancaster County Anabaptist community founded in c. 1760, has the world's largest Amish settlement, with 37,000 people in 220 church districts in 2017, or about 7% of the county's population. By 2021 the Amish population increased to almost 42,000. The Lancaster Amish affiliation is relatively liberal concerning the use of technologies compared to other Amish affiliations.

Historically speaking, the Amish population in 1970 numbered only about 7,000; that climbed to about 12,400 by 1990 and 16,900 by 2000. It has doubled since then.

Lancaster also hosts other Plain Anabaptist groups. As of 2000, there are about 3,000 Old Order Mennonites of the Groffdale Conference who drive black top buggies instead of the grey top buggies of the Amish in Lancaster County. Other buggy-using Old Order Mennonites in Lancaster County are subgroups of the Stauffer Mennonites with 283 baptized members and the Reidenbach Mennonites with 232. There are about 4,000 members of the car-driving Weaverland Old Order Mennonite Conference. A congregation of 83 members of the Old Order River Brethren lives there as well as 84 members of the Reformed Mennonite Church who have retained the most conservative form of Plain dress of all Plain groups. There are 74 members of the Old German Baptist Brethren in Lancaster County.

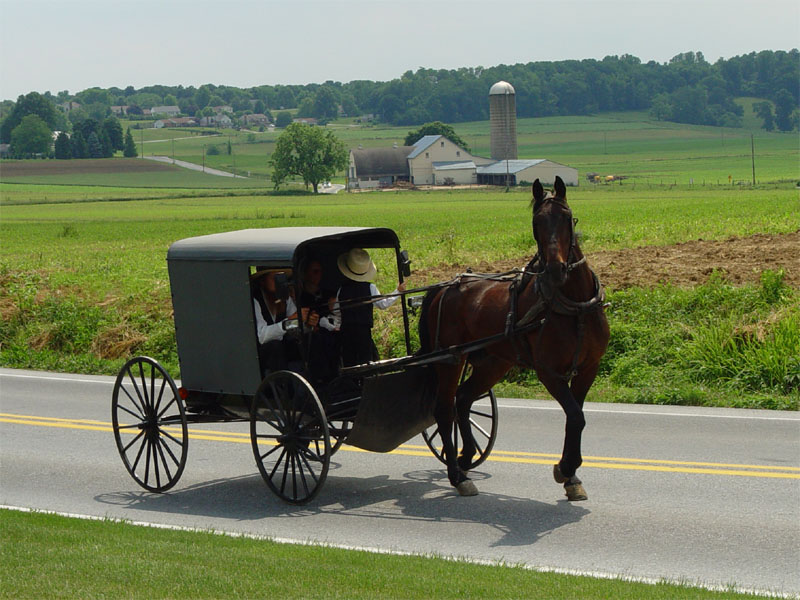
An Amish family in a traditional Amish buggy in the county

Amish children in the back of a buggy on the road

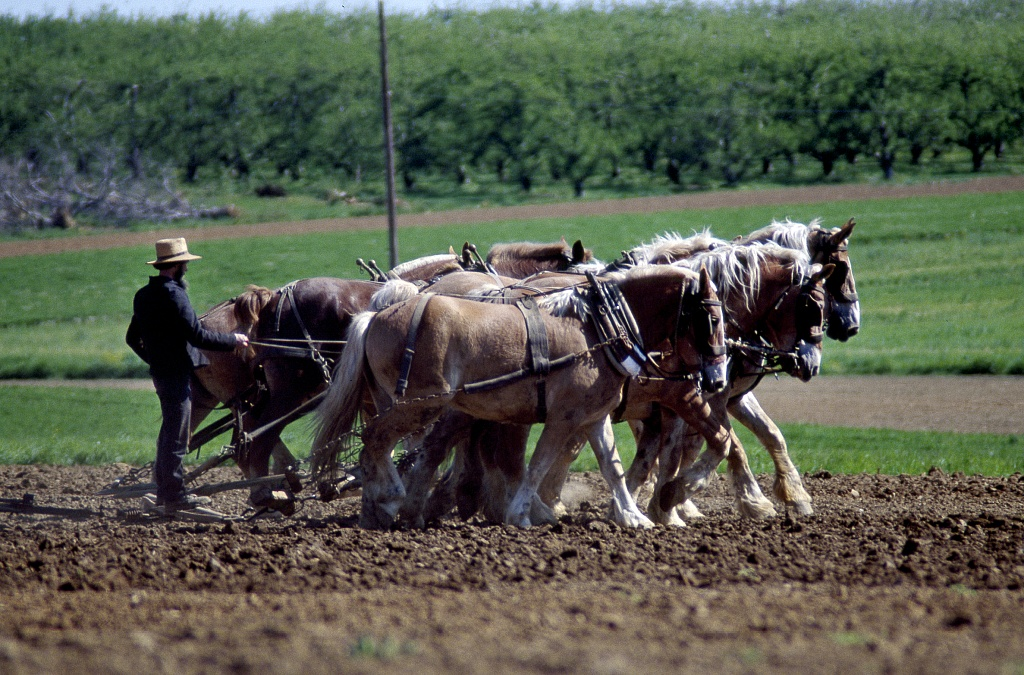
Amish farmers use only horse power to cultivate their land

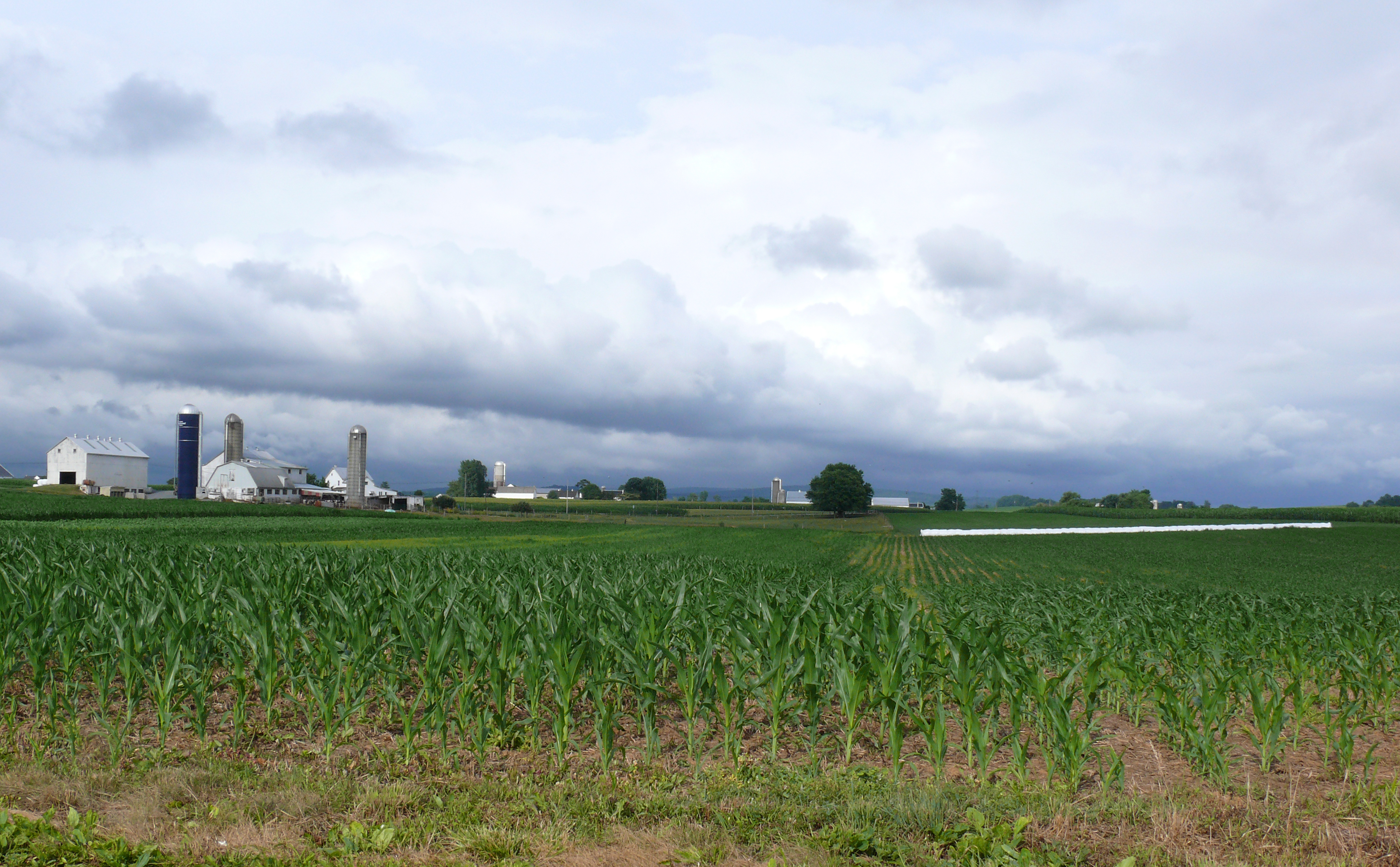
Amish crops in the county

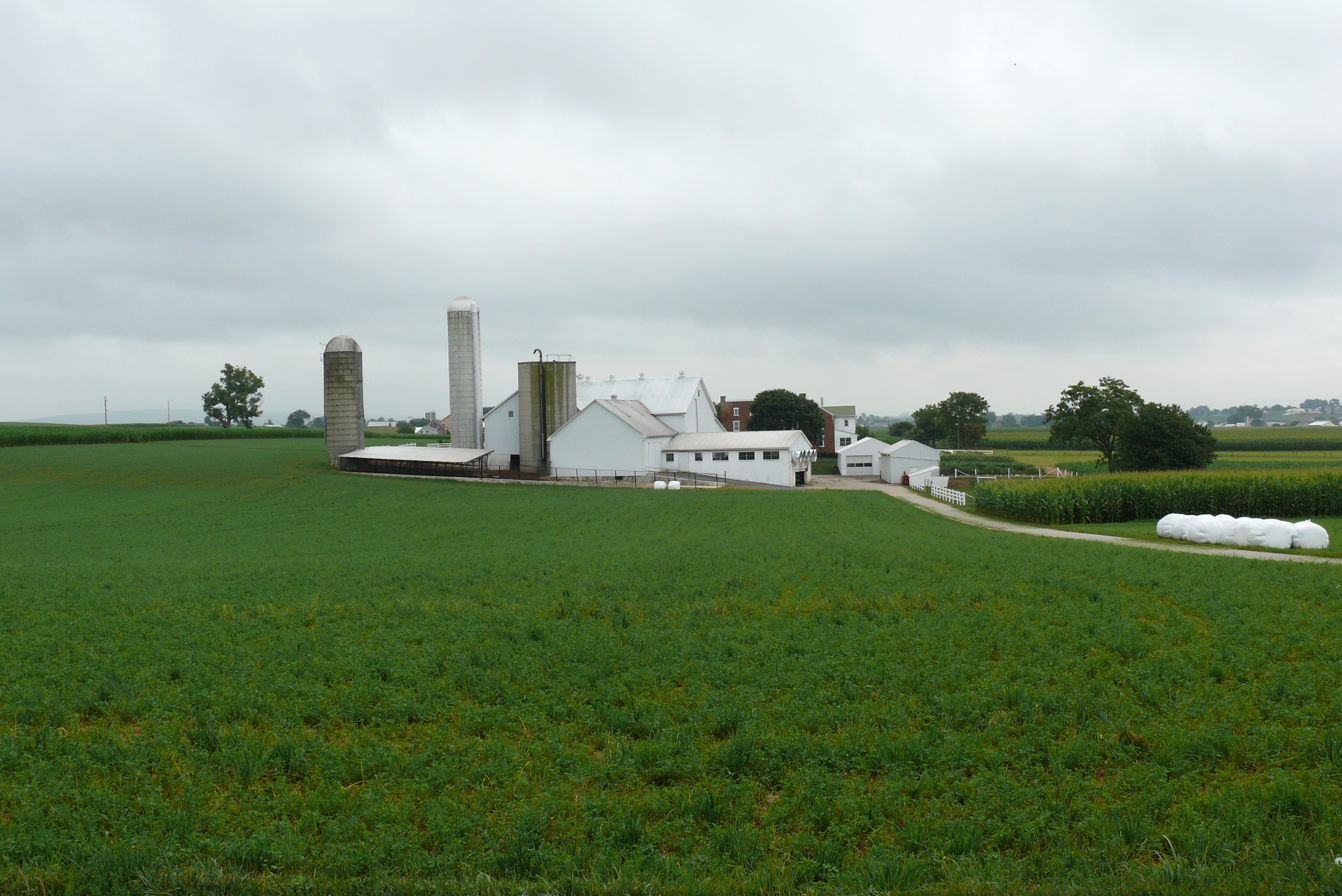
An Amish dairy farm

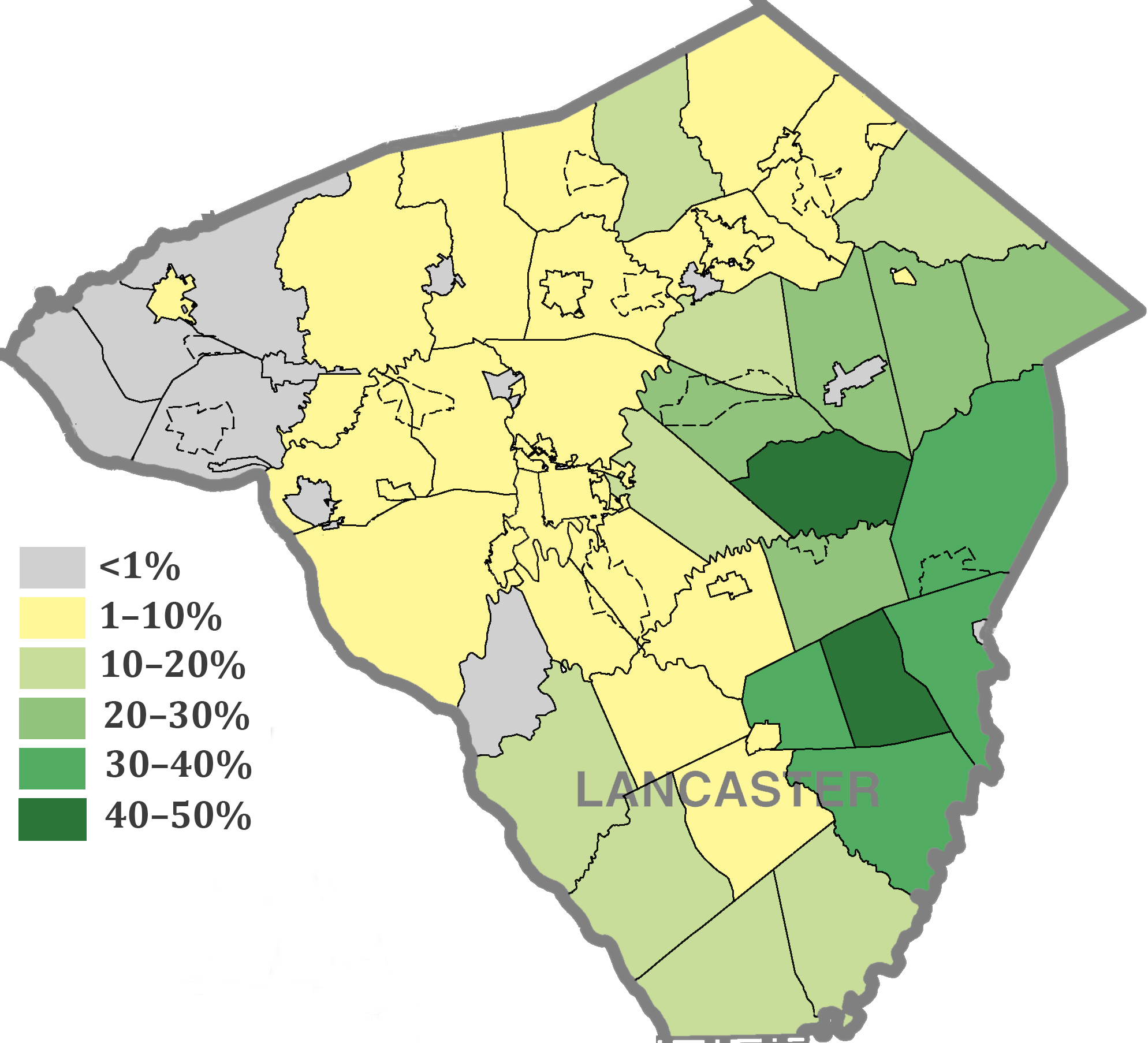
Persons speaking an Indo-European language at home other than English or Spanish (among adults 18+), a vast majority of them speak Pennsylvania German. (ACS 2019 5-year estimate).

=== Religion ===
- Protestant: 38% (of whom Evangelical Protestant 23.7%, Mainline Protestant 13.8%, Black Protestant 0.4%)
- Roman Catholic: 9.9%
- Eastern Orthodox Christian: 0.3%
- Other: 1.1%
- Unaffiliated: 50.9%

=== Dialect ===
Some County residents speak with a Pennsylvania Dutch-influenced dialect. This is most common in the Lancaster, Lebanon, York, and Harrisburg areas, and incorporates influences from the Pennsylvania Dutch in dialect and in nomenclature.

=== Metropolitan statistical area ===
The U.S. Office of Management and Budget has designated Lancaster County as the Lancaster, PA Metropolitan Statistical Area. With a population of 552,984 as of the 2020 U.S. census, the Lancaster, PA metropolitan area is the sixth most populous metropolitan area in Pennsylvania, after the Philadelphia metropolitan area, Greater Pittsburgh, the Lehigh Valley, the Harrisburg–Carlisle metropolitan statistical area, and the Wyoming Valley.

On a national level, the Lancaster, PA metropolitan area is the 104th most populous metropolitan statistical area as of the 2020 census and the 102nd most populous primary statistical area in the United States as of the 2010 census.

== Government and politics ==
Results of the 2024 United States presidential election in Lancaster County Trump: 80–90%; 70–80%; 60–70%; 50–60%; 40–50%; Harris: 80–90%; 70–80%; 60–70%; 50–60%; 40–50%

Results in Lancaster County of the 1971 Pennsylvania referendum to prohibit sex discrimination Yes: 60–70%; 50–60%; No: 60–70%; 50–60%; Other: Tie; No data

Results in Lancaster County of the 2021 Pennsylvania referendum to prohibit racial and ethnic discrimination Yes: 90–100%; 80–90%; 70–80%; 60–70%; 50–60%; No: 60–70%; 50–60%

=== Political party affiliation ===
United States presidential election results for Lancaster County, Pennsylvania
Year	Republican		Democratic		Third party(ies)	
Year	No.	%	No.	%	No.	%
1880	19,489	64.11%	10,789	35.49%	120	0.39%
1884	19,848	65.85%	9,953	33.02%	340	1.13%
1888	21,976	66.56%	10,495	31.79%	545	1.65%
1892	20,126	64.46%	10,326	33.07%	770	2.47%
1896	24,337	72.67%	8,145	24.32%	1,008	3.01%
1900	23,230	71.77%	8,437	26.07%	701	2.17%
1904	26,083	76.54%	7,092	20.81%	902	2.65%
1908	23,523	71.43%	8,109	24.62%	1,299	3.94%
1912	12,668	36.95%	8,574	25.01%	13,040	38.04%
1916	20,292	63.42%	10,016	31.30%	1,688	5.28%
1920	29,549	72.88%	9,521	23.48%	1,472	3.63%
1924	42,787	73.73%	12,091	20.83%	3,156	5.44%
1928	55,530	81.43%	12,146	17.81%	516	0.76%
1932	34,502	56.54%	24,406	40.00%	2,111	3.46%
1936	42,272	51.38%	38,454	46.74%	1,547	1.88%
1940	44,939	58.05%	32,210	41.61%	269	0.35%
1944	44,888	61.77%	27,353	37.64%	432	0.59%
1948	46,306	67.60%	21,308	31.11%	885	1.29%
1952	64,193	69.23%	28,146	30.36%	382	0.41%
1956	69,026	72.05%	26,538	27.70%	237	0.25%
1960	78,390	70.06%	33,233	29.70%	266	0.24%
1964	52,243	49.52%	53,041	50.27%	224	0.21%
1968	69,953	64.59%	29,870	27.58%	8,484	7.83%
1972	81,036	75.64%	24,223	22.61%	1,879	1.75%
1976	72,106	65.74%	35,533	32.40%	2,037	1.86%
1980	79,963	67.25%	30,026	25.25%	8,908	7.49%
1984	99,090	75.63%	31,308	23.90%	618	0.47%
1988	96,979	70.77%	38,982	28.45%	1,068	0.78%
1992	88,447	55.22%	44,255	27.63%	27,478	17.15%
1996	92,875	59.81%	49,120	31.63%	13,291	8.56%
2000	115,900	66.09%	54,968	31.34%	4,499	2.57%
2004	145,591	65.77%	74,328	33.58%	1,453	0.66%
2008	126,568	55.21%	99,586	43.44%	3,095	1.35%
2012	130,669	58.50%	88,481	39.62%	4,201	1.88%
2016	137,914	56.33%	91,093	37.21%	15,825	6.46%
2020	160,209	56.94%	115,847	41.17%	5,319	1.89%
2024	166,261	57.20%	120,119	41.32%	4,292	1.48%

Pennsylvania Gubernatorial election results for Lancaster County
Year	Republican		Democratic		Third party(ies)	
Year	No.	%	No.	%	No.	%
1970	48,749	59.62%	28,918	35.37%	4,094	5.01%
1974	49,871	62.80%	28,474	35.86%	1,068	1.34%
1978	59,416	72.60%	21,768	26.60%	659	0.81%
1982	63,637	70.55%	25,939	28.76%	628	0.70%
1986	68,736	71.03%	27,247	28.16%	788	0.81%
1990	24,569	27.11%	66,069	72.89%	0	0.00%
1994	66,295	54.75%	27,376	22.61%	27,415	22.64%
1998	72,198	72.13%	15,891	15.88%	12,010	12.00%
2002	83,607	66.07%	40,791	32.23%	2,151	1.70%
2006	87,668	58.21%	62,934	41.79%	0	0.00%
2010	106,430	71.10%	43,268	28.90%	0	0.00%
2014	83,179	59.09%	57,594	40.91%	0	0.00%
2018	102,229	50.55%	96,040	47.49%	3,955	1.96%
2022	112,040	49.96%	108,233	48.26%	3,995	1.78%

Lancaster County was the home of the final pre-American Civil War U.S. President, James Buchanan, a Democrat. Since the Civil War, however, Lancaster County has been a Republican stronghold. The GOP controls the vast majority of county and municipal elected offices in Lancaster County.

In September 2008, the Democratic Party reached the benchmark of 100,000 registered voters for the first time in the county's history. The party had just 82,171 registered Democrats in 2004. As of 2008, the ratio of Republicans to Democrats in Lancaster County now stands at 1.8 Republicans to 1 Democrat, down from a 3–1 advantage for the Republicans in the late 1990s. Prior to a 2025 special election, Republicans had exclusively represented the county in the Pennsylvania Senate since 1889.

Lancaster County has only ever voted for a Democratic presidential nominee once since Buchanan in 1856, a resident of the city of Lancaster. In 1964, Lyndon Johnson carried Lancaster County as part of his 44-state landslide, winning by 798 votes, less than a single percentage point. Franklin D. Roosevelt failed to carry the county during any of his four successful runs for president, only coming within 4,000 votes of carrying it in his 46-state landslide of 1936. In 2008, Barack Obama became the first Democrat to garner 40 percent of the county's vote since Johnson, and the second since Roosevelt. In both 2016 and 2020, Donald Trump earned 56 percent of the vote in the county, with Joe Biden becoming the third Democrat in 80 years to win 40 percent of the county's vote. In 2024, Trump marginally improved on his past performances in Lancaster County, earning 57 percent of the vote.

Lancaster County Voter Registration Statistics as of May 19, 2025
Political Party	Total Voters	Percentage
Republican	183,683	51.50%
Democratic	110,318	30.93%
No party affiliation	46,381	13.00%
Minor parties	16,284	4.57%
Total	356,666	100.00%

=== United States Senate ===
Senator	Party
David McCormick	Republican
John Fetterman	Democratic

United States Senate election results for Lancaster County, Pennsylvania1
Year	Republican		Democratic		Third party(ies)	
Year	No.	%	No.	%	No.	%
1994	80,446	69.63%	31,645	27.39%	3,440	2.98%
2000	119,519	70.34%	47,600	28.02%	2,788	1.64%
2006	87,535	58.28%	62,662	41.72%	0	0.00%
2012	127,135	57.71%	88,778	40.30%	4,387	1.99%
2018	107,454	53.10%	90,521	44.73%	4,389	2.17%
2024	162,105	56.22%	118,580	41.12%	7,668	2.66%

United States Senate election results for Lancaster County, Pennsylvania3
Year	Republican		Democratic		Third party(ies)	
Year	No.	%	No.	%	No.	%
1992	87,828	57.60%	49,815	32.67%	14,846	9.74%
1998	69,422	72.20%	21,108	21.95%	5,616	5.84%
2004	130,527	61.73%	56,336	26.64%	24,569	11.62%
2010	102,113	68.18%	47,649	31.82%	0	0.00%
2016	142,774	58.85%	89,922	37.07%	9,909	4.08%
2022	124,798	55.58%	94,632	42.14%	5,118	2.28%

=== United States House of Representatives ===
District	Representative	Party
11	Lloyd Smucker	Republican

=== Pennsylvania State Senate ===
District	Representative	Party
13	Scott Martin	Republican
36	James Andrew Malone	Democratic

=== State House of Representatives ===
Representative	Party	District
Mindy Fee	Republican	Pennsylvania's 37th Representative District
Brett Miller	Republican	Pennsylvania's 41st Representative District
Keith Greiner	Republican	Pennsylvania's 43rd Representative District
Ismail Smith-Wade-El	Democratic	Pennsylvania's 49th Representative District
Nikki Rivera	Democratic	Pennsylvania's 96th Representative District
Steven Mentzer	Republican	Pennsylvania's 97th Representative District
Tom Jones	Republican	Pennsylvania's 98th Representative District
David Zimmerman	Republican	Pennsylvania's 99th Representative District
Bryan Cutler	Republican	Pennsylvania's 100th Representative District

=== Commissioners ===
Office	Holder	Party
Chairman	Joshua Parsons	Republican
Vice-chairman	Ray D'Agostino	Republican
County Commissioner	Alice Yoder	Democratic

=== Row officers ===
Office	Holder	Party
Clerk of Courts	Nicky Woods	Republican
Controller	Scott Wiglesworth	Republican
Coroner	Dr. Stephen Diamantoni, M.D.	Republican
District Attorney	Heather Adams, Esq.	Republican
Prothonotary	Andrew Spade	Republican
Recorder of Deeds	Ann Hess	Republican
Register of Wills	Ann Cooper	Republican
Sheriff	Chris Leppler	Republican
Treasurer	Amber Green	Republican

== Economy ==
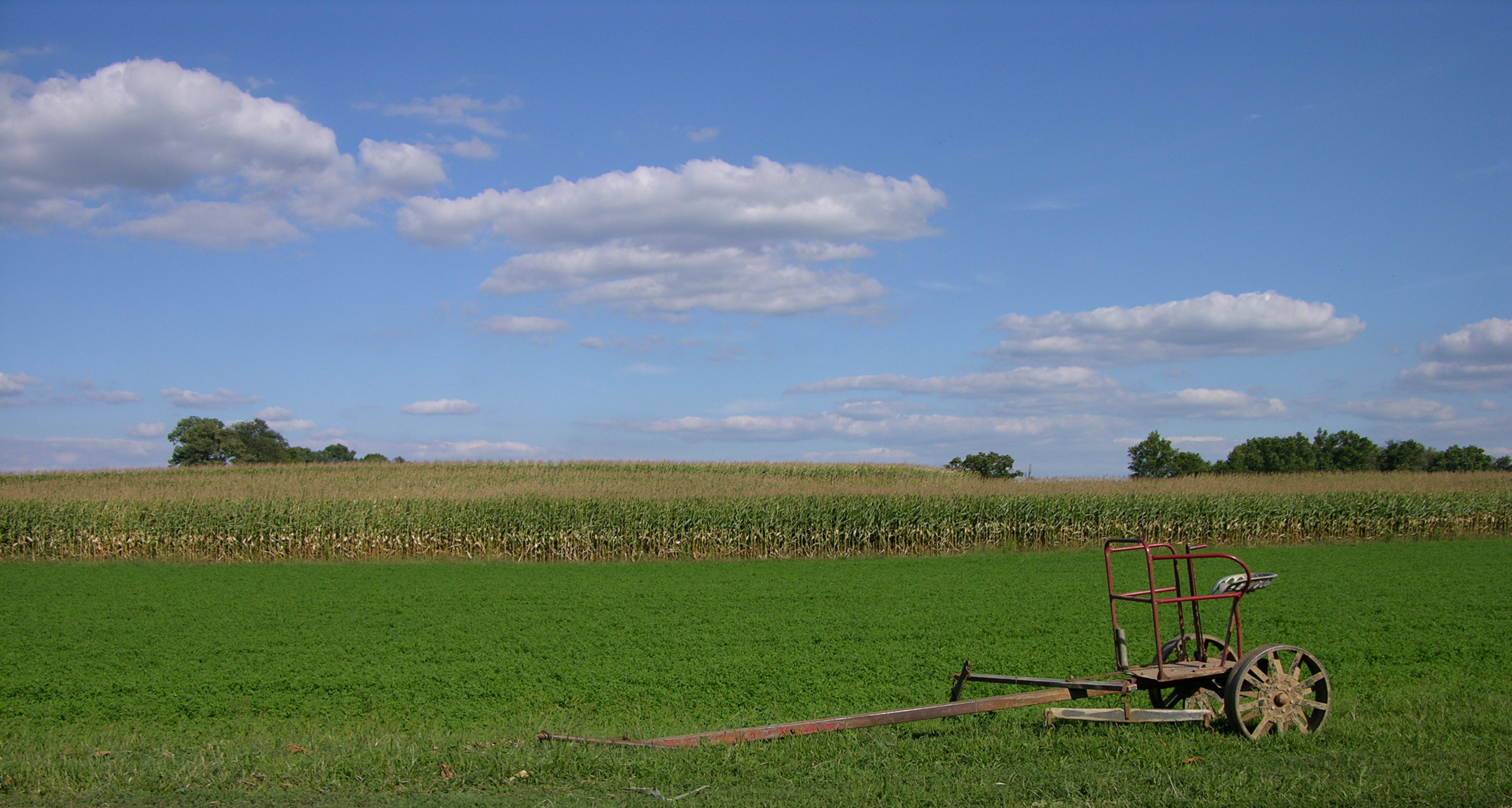
A Lancaster County farm with a horse-drawn farm implement near a corn field

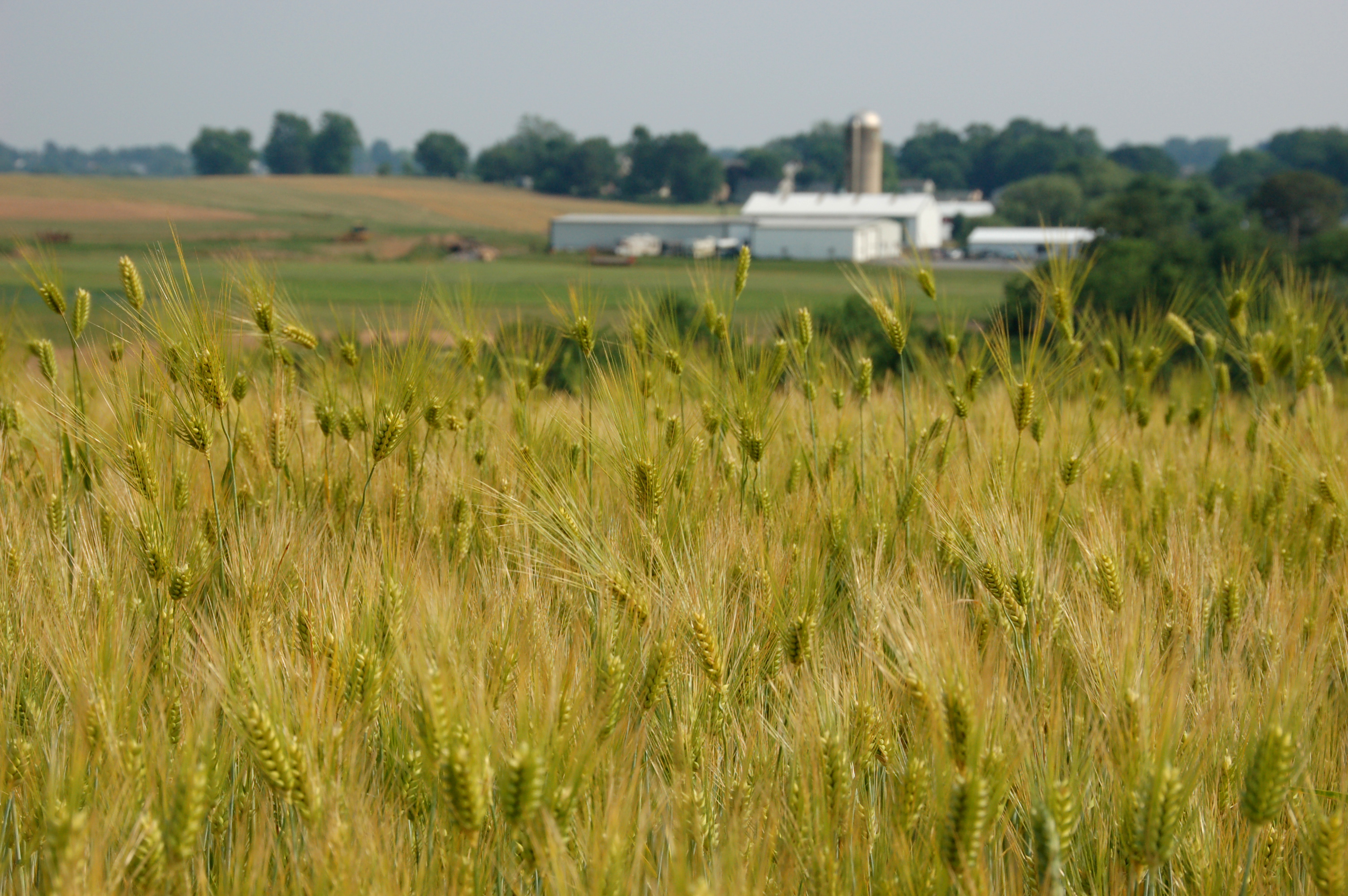
A field of wheat in the county

In 2021, the county had a per capita personal income (PCPI) of $61,547, 96% of the national average. This reflects a growth of 5.7% from the prior year, versus a 7.3% growth for the nation as a whole. The county poverty rate was 8.8% compared to a national rate of 11.6%.

In 2005, Lancaster County was 10th of all counties in Pennsylvania with 17.7% of its workforce employed in manufacturing; the state averages 13.7%, and the leader, Crawford County, has only 25.1%.

Lancaster County lags in information workers. It ranks 31st in the state with 1.3% of the workforce; the state as a whole employs 2.1% in information technology.

The county ranks 11th in the state in managerial and financial workers, despite having 12.5% of the workforce in those occupations (versus the state average of 12.8%). The state leaders are Chester County with 20.5% and Montgomery County with 18.5%.

With 17.3% working in the professions, Lancaster County is 31st in Pennsylvania, compared to a state average of 21.5%. Centre County leads with 31.8%, undoubtedly due to Penn State's giant footprint in an otherwise rural county, but the upscale Philadelphia suburbs of Montgomery County give them 27.2%.

Lancaster County ranks even lower, 34th, in service workers, with 13.3% of the workforce, compared to a state average of 15.8%. Philadelphia County, leads with 20.5%.

Lancaster County has an unemployment rate of 7.8% as of August 2010. This is a rise from a rate of 7.6% the previous year.

There are 11,000 companies in Lancaster County. The county's largest manufacturing and distributing employers at the end of 2003 were Acme Markets, Alumax Mill Products, Anvil International, Armstrong World Industries, Bollman Hat, CNH Global, Conestoga Wood Specialties, Dart Container, High Industries, Lancaster Laboratories, Pepperidge Farm, R R Donnelley & Sons, The Hershey Company, Tyco Electronics, Tyson Foods, Warner-Lambert, and Yellow Transportation.

Auntie Anne's, Clipper Magazine, Lancaster Farming, MapQuest, Turkey Hill Dairy, Clair Global, and Wilbur Chocolate Company are Lancaster County-based organizations with an economic footprint of regional or national significance.

Herley Industries is a local producer of microwave and millimeter wave products for the defense and aerospace industries.

=== Agriculture ===
With some of the most fertile non-irrigated soil in the U.S., Lancaster County has a strong farming industry. Lancaster County's 5293 farms, generating $800 million in food, feed and fiber, are responsible for nearly a fifth of the state's agricultural output. Chester County, with its high-value mushroom farms, is second, with $375 million.

Livestock-raising is responsible for $710 million of that $800 million, with dairy accounting for $266 million, poultry and eggs accounting for $258 million. Cattle and swine each accounts for about $90 million.

Agriculture is likely to remain an important part of Lancaster County: almost exactly half of Lancaster County's land – 320,000 acres (130,000 ha) – is zoned for agriculture, and of those, 276,000 acres (112,000 ha) are "effective agricultural zoning", requiring at least 20 acres (8.1 ha) per residence.

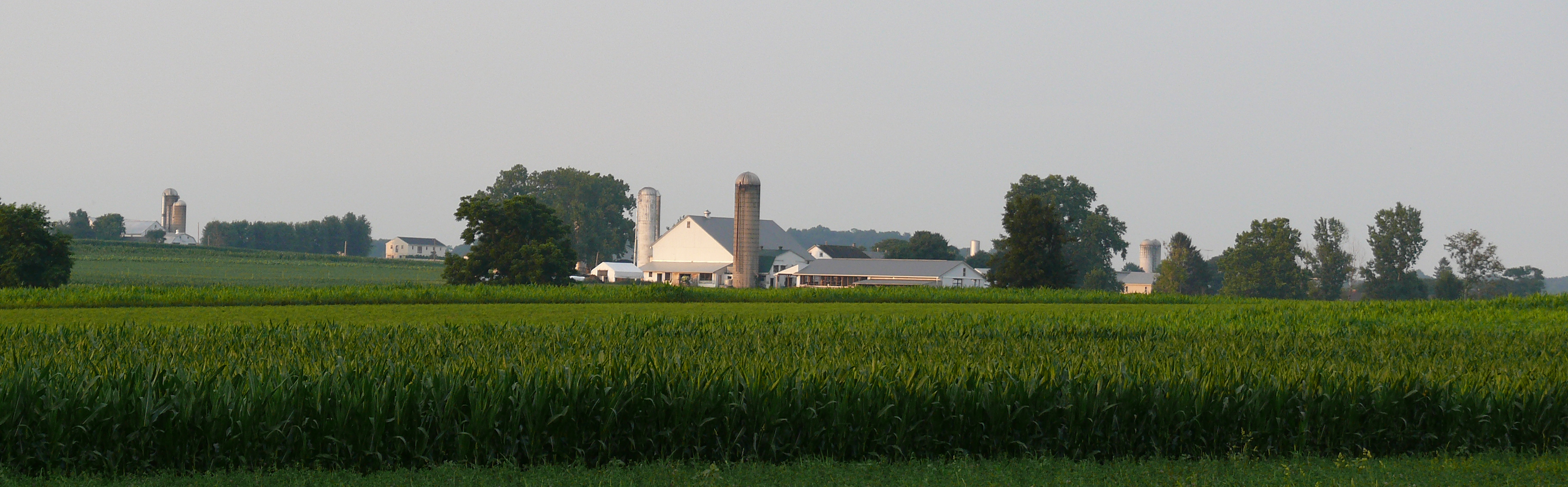
Amish dairy farms in Lancaster County

=== Tourism ===
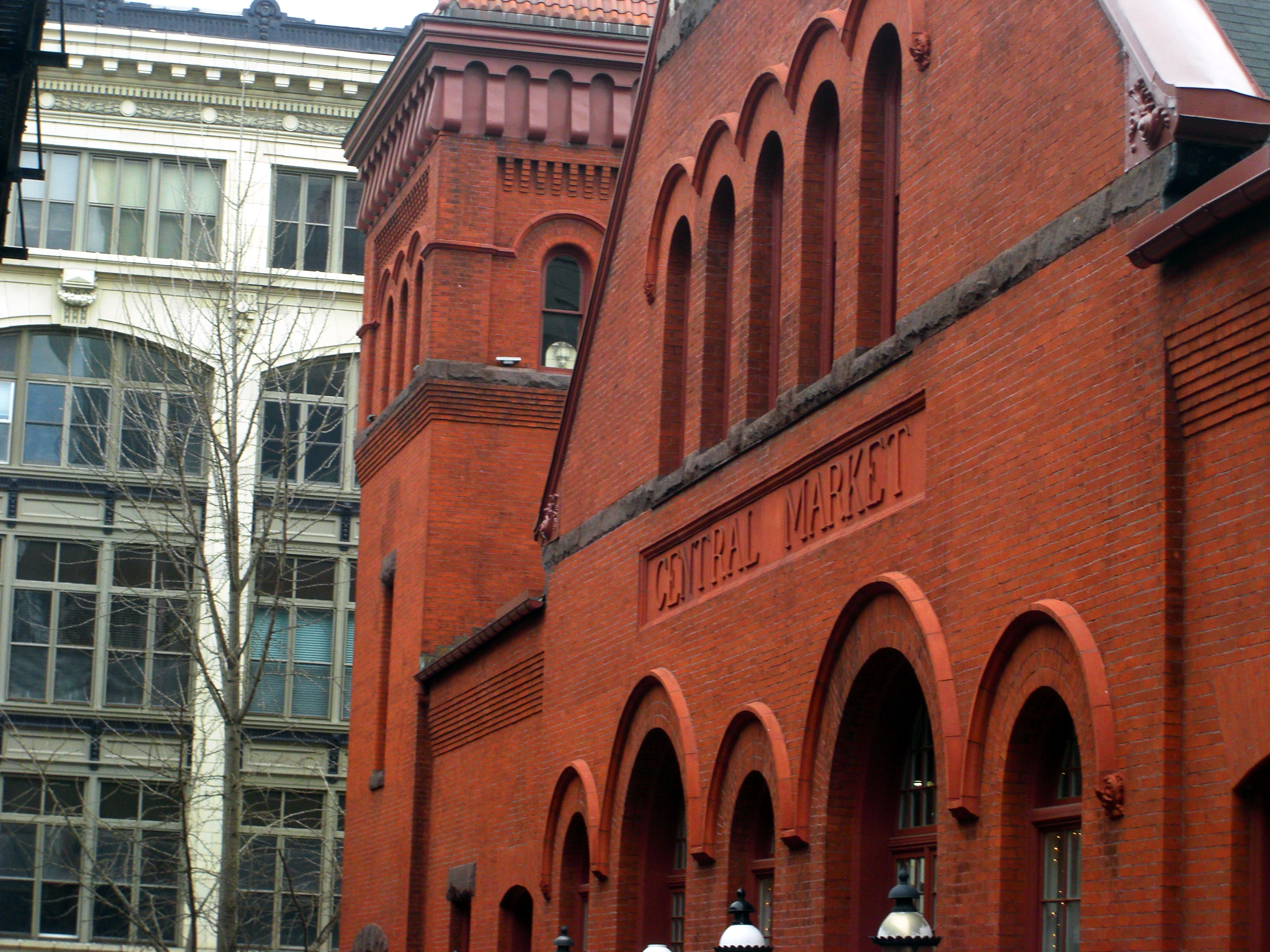
Central Market in Lancaster, a popular tourist attraction

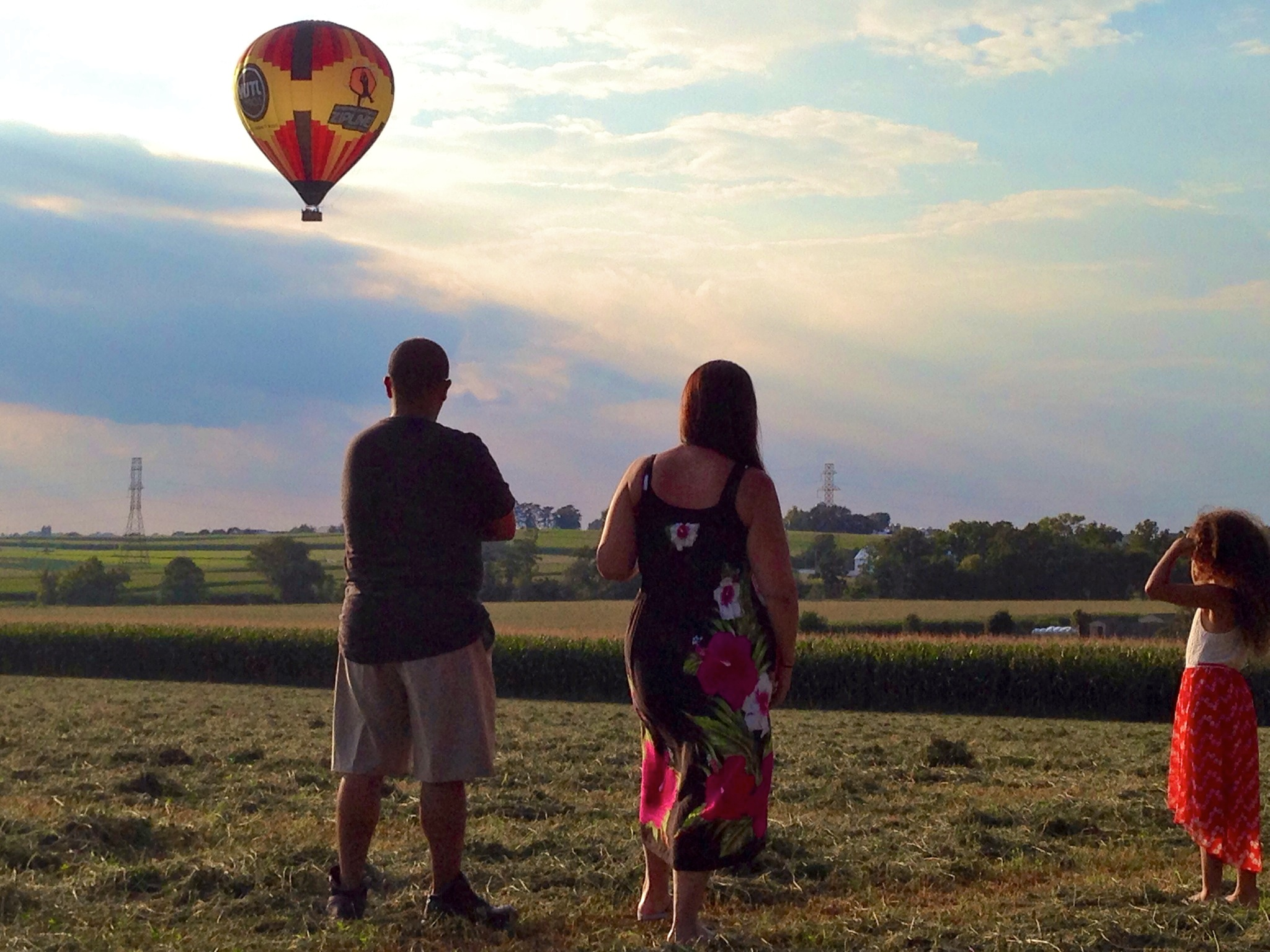
A hot air balloon ride in Lancaster County

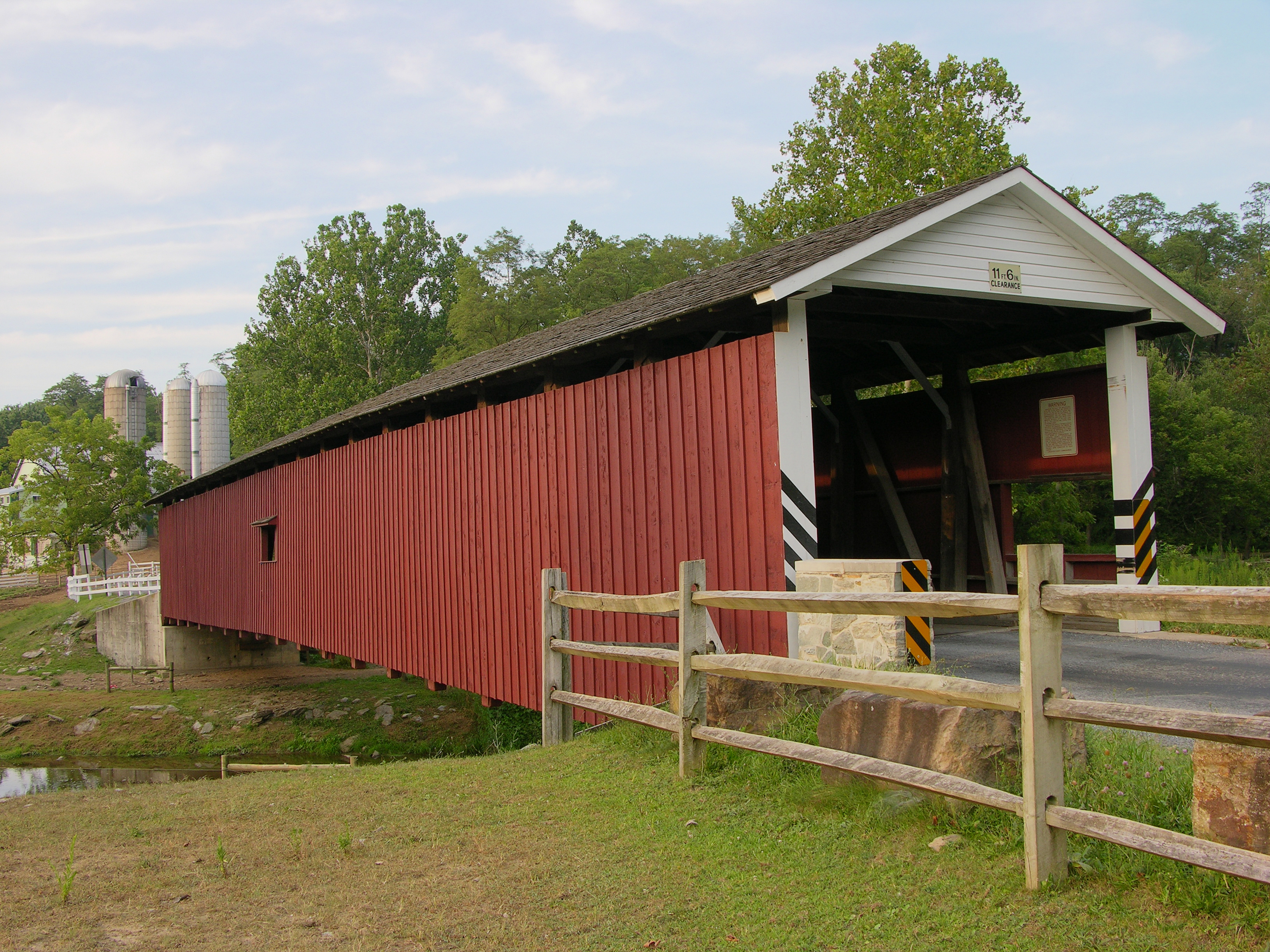
One of the county's 29 covered bridges

Tourism is a significant industry in Lancaster County, employing approximately 20,000. In the 1860s, articles in the Atlantic Monthly and Lippincott's Magazine published right after the Civil War, introduced Lancaster County to many readers. However, tourism in Lancaster was nearly non-existent prior to 1955.

A New York Times travel article in 1952 brought 25,000 visitors, but the 1955 Broadway musical Plain and Fancy helped to fan the flames of Amish tourism in the mid-1950s. Shortly thereafter, Adolph Neuber (then-owner of the Willows Restaurant) opened the first tourist attraction in Lancaster County showcasing the Amish culture. Lancaster County tourism tapered off, after the 1974 gas rationing and the Three Mile Island incident led to five years of stagnation.

Local tourism officials viewed it as deus ex machina when Hollywood stepped in to rescue their industry. Harrison Ford, in the 1985 movie Witness, portrayed a Philadelphia detective who journeys to the Amish community to protect an Amish boy who has witnessed a murder in Philadelphia. The detective is attracted to the boy's widowed mother; the movie is less a thriller than a romance about the difficulties faced by an outsider in love with a widow from The Community. The film was nominated for eight Oscars, and won two. However, the real winner was Lancaster County tourism.

Once again, especially after the September 11, 2001 attacks, tourism in Lancaster County has shifted. Instead of families arriving for a three- to four-day stay for a general visit, now tourists arrive for a specific event, whether it be the rhubarb festival, the "maize maze", to see Thomas the Tank Engine, for Sertoma's annual "World's Largest Chicken Barbecue" or for the latest show at Sight & Sound Theatres. The tourism industry is discouraged by this change, but not despondent:

In four years of working here on the Strasburg Rail Road, I've only had one complaint, she said that the ride is too short. People love Lancaster County. They'll keep coming back.

— Betty McCormack

The county promotes tourist visits to the county's numerous historic and picturesque covered bridges by publishing driving tours of the bridges. With over 200 bridges still in existence, Pennsylvania has more covered bridges than anywhere else in the world, and at 29 covered bridges, Lancaster County has the largest share.

The Lancaster County Convention Center Authority constructed the $170 million Lancaster County Convention Center in downtown Lancaster on the site of the former Watt & Shand building.

Other tourist attractions include the American Music Theatre, Dutch Wonderland, Ephrata Cloister, Ephrata Fair, Hans Herr House, Landis Valley Museum, Pennsylvania Dutch Country, Pennsylvania Renaissance Faire (one of the largest Renaissance fairs in the world), Railroad Museum of Pennsylvania, Rock Ford plantation, Robert Fulton Birthplace, Sight & Sound Theatres, Strasburg Railroad, Wilbur Chocolate, Wheatland (James Buchanan House) and Sturgis Pretzel House. There are many tours of this historic area including the Downtown Lancaster Walking Tour.

== Education ==
Lancaster County's colleges include Eastern Mennonite University, Elizabethtown College, Franklin & Marshall College, Harrisburg Area Community College, Lancaster Bible College, Lancaster Theological Seminary, Millersville University of Pennsylvania, Pennsylvania College of Art and Design, Thaddeus Stevens College of Technology, and PA College of Health Sciences.

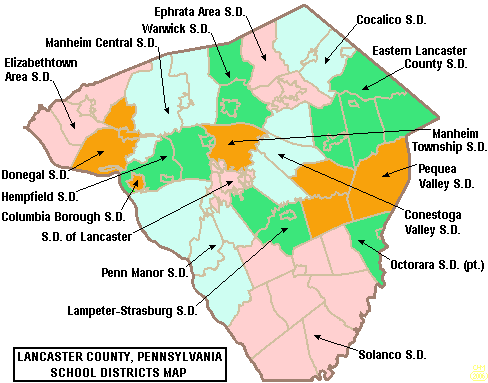
A map of Lancaster County public school districts

There are 16 public school districts in the county:

- Cocalico
- Columbia Borough
- Conestoga Valley
- Conrad Weiser Area
- Donegal
- Eastern Lancaster County
- Elizabethtown Area
- Ephrata Area
- Hempfield
- Lampeter-Strasburg
- Lancaster
- Manheim Central
- Manheim Township
- Octorara Area
- Penn Manor
- Pequea Valley
- Solanco
- Warwick

There is also one charter school, the La Academia Charter School. Lancaster Country Day School, an independent day school, is located on the west end of Lancaster City. Linden Hall, an independent boarding and day school for girls, is located in Lititz.

Lancaster County has a federated library system with 14 member libraries, three branches and a bookmobile. The Library System of Lancaster County was established in April 1987 to provide countywide services and cooperative programs for its member libraries. The Board of Lancaster County Commissioners appoints the Library System of Lancaster County's seven-member board of directors. The System is an agent of the Commonwealth.

== Sports ==
Before the Lancaster Stormers, Lancaster was the home of the Lancaster Red Roses, which played from 1906 to about 1930, and from 1932 to 1961. In 2005 the Lancaster SBarnstormers joined the Atlantic League of Professional Baseball. The Barnstormers were named after the "barnstorming" players who played exhibition games in the county. Their official colors are red, navy blue, and khaki, the same as those of the Red Roses. This franchise won their first league championship in their second season, in 2006. They won their second league championship in 2014. They have revived the old baseball rivalry between Lancaster and nearby York, called the War of the Roses, when the York Revolution started their inaugural season in 2007. In 2023, the Lancaster Barnstormers changed their name to the Lancaster Stormers.

The Women's Premier Soccer League expanded to Lancaster for the 2008 season, with the Lancaster Inferno. The WPSL is a FIFA-recognized women's league. The Inferno is owned by the Pennsylvania Classics organization and play their home games at the Hempfield High School stadium in Landisville. The Inferno's colors are orange, black, and white.

=== Amateur teams ===
In 2004, the amateur Lancaster Lightning football team of the North American Football League played at Pequea Valley High School's football stadium in Kinzers.

Lancaster is home to the Dutchland Derby Rollers (DDR), a member of the Women's Flat Track Derby Association (WFTDA.) Founded in 2006, The Dutchland Rollers have two travel teams, the All-Stars and the Blitz. Both rosters play teams from neighboring leagues, though it is the Dutchland All-Stars that compete for national ranking. Their home rink is Overlook Activities Center, and their colors are orange and black.

=== Former teams ===
From 1946 to 1980, a professional basketball team, as the Lancaster Red Roses, (as well as the Lancaster Rockets and the Lancaster Lightning) played in the Continental Basketball Association.

== Transportation ==
Lying on the natural route from Philadelphia to the western part of Pennsylvania, Lancaster County has given rise to many improvements in transportation, such as the Philadelphia and Lancaster Turnpike, later part of the Lincoln Highway, in 1794, a canal in 1820, and the Philadelphia and Columbia Railroad in 1834.

=== Major roads and highways ===
- I-76 / Penna Turnpike
- US 30
- US 222
- US 322
- PA 10
- PA 23
- PA 41
- PA 72
- PA 230
- PA 241
- PA 272
- PA 283
- PA 324
- PA 340
- PA 372
- PA 441
- PA 462
- PA 472
- PA 501
- PA 625
- PA 722
- PA 741
- PA 743
- PA 772
- PA 896
- PA 897
- PA 999

=== Current railroads ===
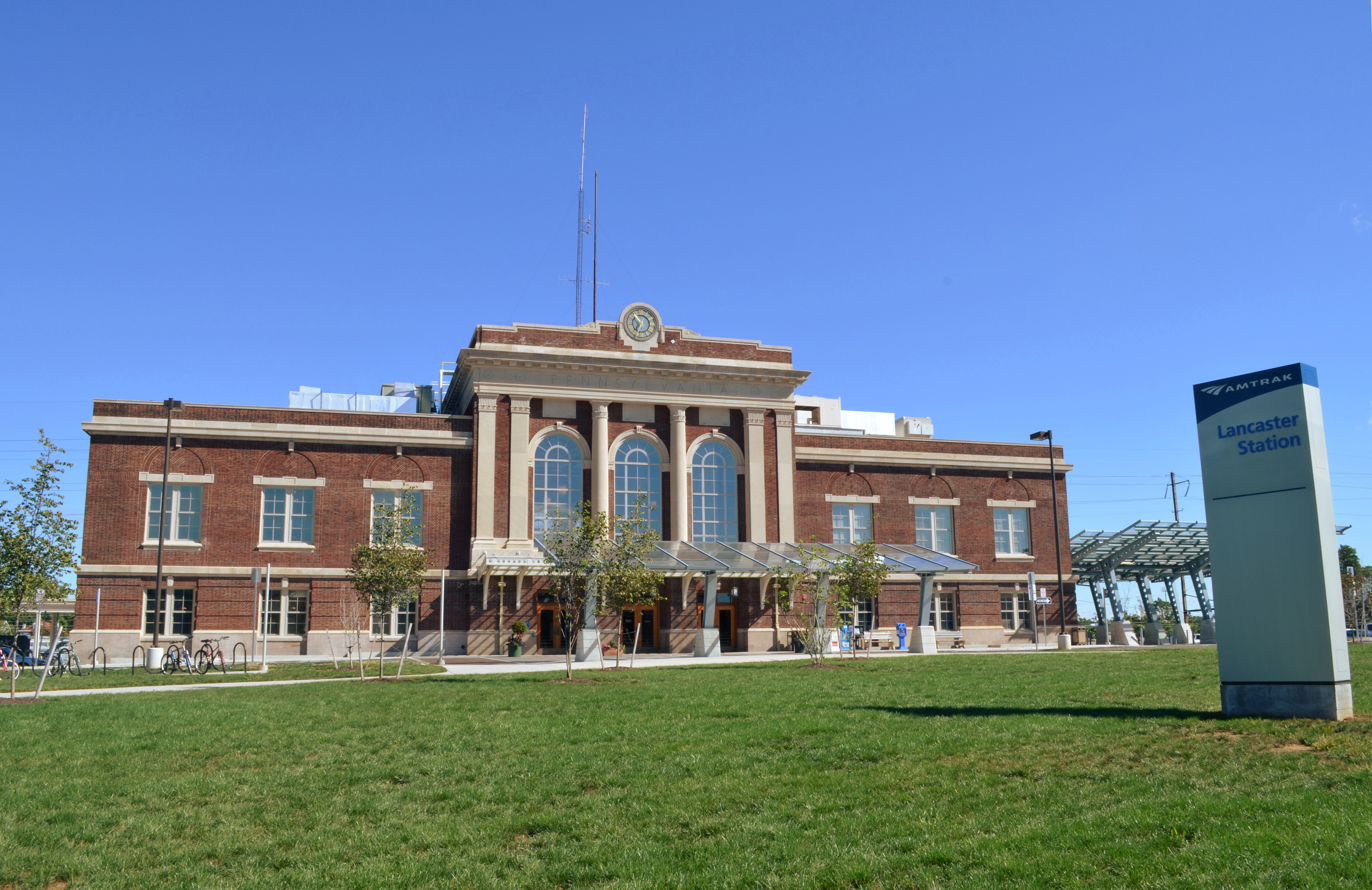
Lancaster Train Station, located on the Keystone Corridor, the second-busiest Amtrak station in Pennsylvania after 30th Street Station in Philadelphia

Passenger service in Lancaster County is provided by Amtrak, whose Keystone Corridor passes through the county, with stops at Lancaster, Mount Joy and Elizabethtown.

The principal freight operator in the county is Norfolk Southern Railway (NS). The NS main line follows the Susquehanna River (with trackage rights for Canadian Pacific Railway (CPR)), and leaves the county by crossing the river on Shocks Mills Bridge near Marietta. NS also has trackage rights over the Keystone Corridor, to which it is connected by the Royalton Branch, which runs north along the river from the main line at Marietta, and the Columbia Branch, which runs from the Corridor at Dillerville to the main line at Columbia. Two other NS branches originate on the Corridor: the Lititz Secondary, which runs from Dillerville to Manheim and ends at Lititz, and the New Holland Industrial, which leaves the Corridor around the east end of Lancaster to run east to New Holland and ends at East Earl.

Several short lines also operate in the county. The Strasburg Rail Road operates passenger excursion trains, along with local freight which interchanges with NS in Paradise. The East Penn Railroad (ESPN) operates on a spur off the NS branch to Manheim, and on a longer line in the northeast corner of Lancaster County into Berks County. Landisville Terminal and Transfer Company (LNTV) operates on a spur off the Amtrak line at Landisville. The Tyburn Railroad operates some trackage around Dillerville. The Columbia and Reading Railway (CORY) began operating on 2.5 miles (4.0 km) of track in Columbia in January 2010.

=== Airport ===
There are two public airports in Lancaster County. Lancaster Airport has passenger service, and Smoketown Airport serves general aviation users.

== Communities ==
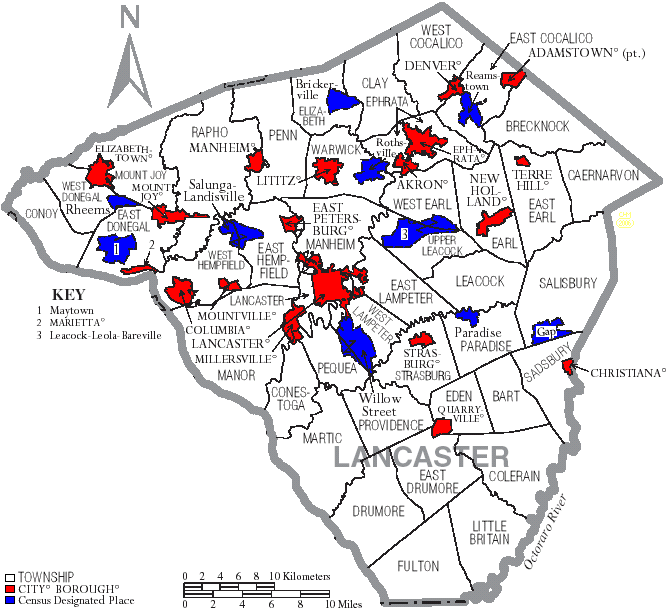
Lancaster County: cities and boroughs (red), townships (white), and census-designated places (blue)

The following cities, boroughs, and townships are located in Lancaster County:

=== City ===
- Lancaster (county seat)

=== Boroughs ===
Christiana is the least populated borough in Lancaster County, as of 2010. Columbia is the most populous.

- Adamstown (Partly in Berks County)
- Akron
- Christiana
- Columbia
- Denver
- East Petersburg
- Elizabethtown
- Ephrata
- Lititz
- Manheim
- Marietta
- Millersville
- Mount Joy
- Mountville
- New Holland
- Quarryville
- Strasburg
- Terre Hill

=== Townships ===
- Bart
- Brecknock
- Caernarvon
- Clay
- Colerain
- Conestoga
- Conoy
- Drumore
- Earl
- East Cocalico
- East Donegal
- East Drumore
- East Earl
- East Hempfield
- East Lampeter
- Eden
- Elizabeth
- Ephrata
- Fulton
- Lancaster
- Leacock
- Little Britain
- Manheim
- Manor
- Martic
- Mount Joy
- Paradise
- Penn
- Pequea
- Providence
- Rapho
- Sadsbury
- Salisbury
- Strasburg
- Upper Leacock
- Warwick
- West Cocalico
- West Donegal
- West Earl
- West Hempfield
- West Lampeter

=== Census-designated places ===
Census-designated places are geographical areas designated by the U.S. Census Bureau for the purposes of compiling demographic data. They are not actual jurisdictions under Pennsylvania law.

- Bainbridge
- Bird-in-Hand
- Blue Ball
- Bowmansville
- Brickerville
- Brownstown
- Churchtown
- Clay
- Conestoga
- East Earl
- Falmouth
- Farmersville
- Fivepointville
- Gap
- Georgetown
- Goodville
- Gordonville
- Hopeland
- Intercourse
- Kirkwood
- Lampeter
- Landisville
- Leola
- Little Britain
- Maytown
- Morgantown (mostly in Berks County)
- Paradise
- Penryn
- Reamstown
- Refton
- Reinholds
- Rheems
- Ronks
- Rothsville
- Salunga
- Schoeneck
- Smoketown
- Soudersburg
- Stevens
- Swartzville
- Wakefield
- Washington Boro
- Willow Street
- Witmer

=== Unincorporated communities ===
Many communities are neither incorporated nor treated as census-designated places.

- Aberdeen
- Anchor
- Bamford
- Bareville
- Bausman
- Bellaire
- Bellemont
- Blainsport
- Buck
- Cambridge (partly in Chester County)
- Centerville
- Central Manor
- Cocalico
- Conewago
- Creswell
- Dillerville
- Donerville
- Elm
- Farmersville
- Fertility
- Georgetown
- Gordonville
- Hempfield
- Hinkletown
- Holtwood
- Kinzers
- Kissel Hill
- Lyndon
- Martindale
- Mastersonville
- Mechanics Grove
- Mechanicsville
- Narvon
- Neffsville
- New Danville
- New Milltown
- New Providence
- Nickel Mines
- Ninepoints
- Peach Bottom
- Pequea
- Rohrerstown
- Safe Harbor
- Silver Spring
- Smoketown
- Talmage
- Vintage
- White Horse

=== Population ranking ===
The population ranking of the following table is based on the 2010 census of Lancaster County.

† county seat:

Rank	City/Town/etc.	Municipal type	Population (2010 Census)
1	† Lancaster	City	59,322
2	Ephrata	Borough	13,394
3	Elizabethtown	Borough	11,545
4	Columbia	Borough	10,400
5	Lititz	Borough	9,369
6	Millersville	Borough	8,168
7	Willow Street	CDP	7,578
8	Mount Joy	Borough	7,410
9	Leola	CDP	7,214
10	New Holland	Borough	5,378
11	Manheim	Borough	4,858
12	East Petersburg	Borough	4,506
13	Akron	Borough	3,876
14	Denver	Borough	3,861
15	Maytown	CDP	3,824
16	Reamstown	CDP	3,361
17	Rothsville	CDP	3,044
18	Brownstown	CDP	2,816
19	Strasburg	Borough	2,809
20	Mountville	Borough	2,802
21	Salunga	CDP	2,695
22	Marietta	Borough	2,588
23	Quarryville	Borough	2,576
24	Swartzville	CDP	2,283
25	Bowmansville	CDP	2,077
26	Gap	CDP	1,931
27	Landisville	CDP	1,893
28	Reinholds	CDP	1,803
29	Adamstown (partially in Berks County)	Borough	1,789
30	Lampeter	CDP	1,669
31	Rheems	CDP	1,598
32	Clay	CDP	1,559
33	Bainbridge	CDP	1,355
34	Brickerville	CDP	1,309
35	Terre Hill	Borough	1,295
36	Intercourse	CDP	1,274
37	Conestoga	CDP	1,258
38	Christiana	Borough	1,168
39	Fivepointville	CDP	1,156
40	East Earl	CDP	1,144
41	Paradise	CDP	1,129
42	Schoeneck	CDP	1,056
43	Blue Ball	CDP	1,031
44	Penryn	CDP	1,024
45	Georgetown	CDP	1,022
46	Farmersville	CDP	991
47	Morgantown (mostly in Berks County)	CDP	826
48	Hopeland	CDP	738
49	Washington Boro	CDP	729
50	Stevens	CDP	612
51	Wakefield	CDP	609
52	Soudersburg	CDP	540
53	Gordonville	CDP	508
54	Witmer	CDP	492
55	Goodville	CDP	482
56	Churchtown	CDP	470
57	Falmouth	CDP	420
58	Bird-in-Hand	CDP	402
59	Kirkwood	CDP	396
60	Little Britain	CDP	372
61	Ronks	CDP	362
62	Smoketown	CDP	357
63	Refton	CDP	298

== In popular culture ==
- The 1985 film Witness took place partially in Lancaster County, where a Philadelphia police officer protects an Amish boy who witnessed a murder while in Philadelphia.
- The 1997 film For Richer or Poorer involved a wealthy New York City couple, who take refuge in Lancaster County after being framed for tax fraud.
- The 2001 HBO mini-series Band of Brothers features Lieutenant Winters, a real veteran from Lancaster County
- The 2010 TV movie Amish Grace was a dramatization of the 2006 murders of Amish school children in Nickel Mines.
- Amish Mafia was a reality TV show on the Discovery Channel about a group of Amish men in Lancaster County who protect and keep the peace after the 2006 Nickel Mines murders. The series ran from 2012–2015.
- The 2013 film Are You Here was set in Lancaster County, where the protagonists grew up.

== See also ==
- List of Lancaster County covered bridges
- List of Pennsylvania films and television shows
- List of people from Lancaster County, Pennsylvania
- National Register of Historic Places listings in Lancaster County, Pennsylvania
- Red Rose Transit Authority
