= Refton, Pennsylvania =

Unincorporated community in Pennsylvania, US

- Census-designated place
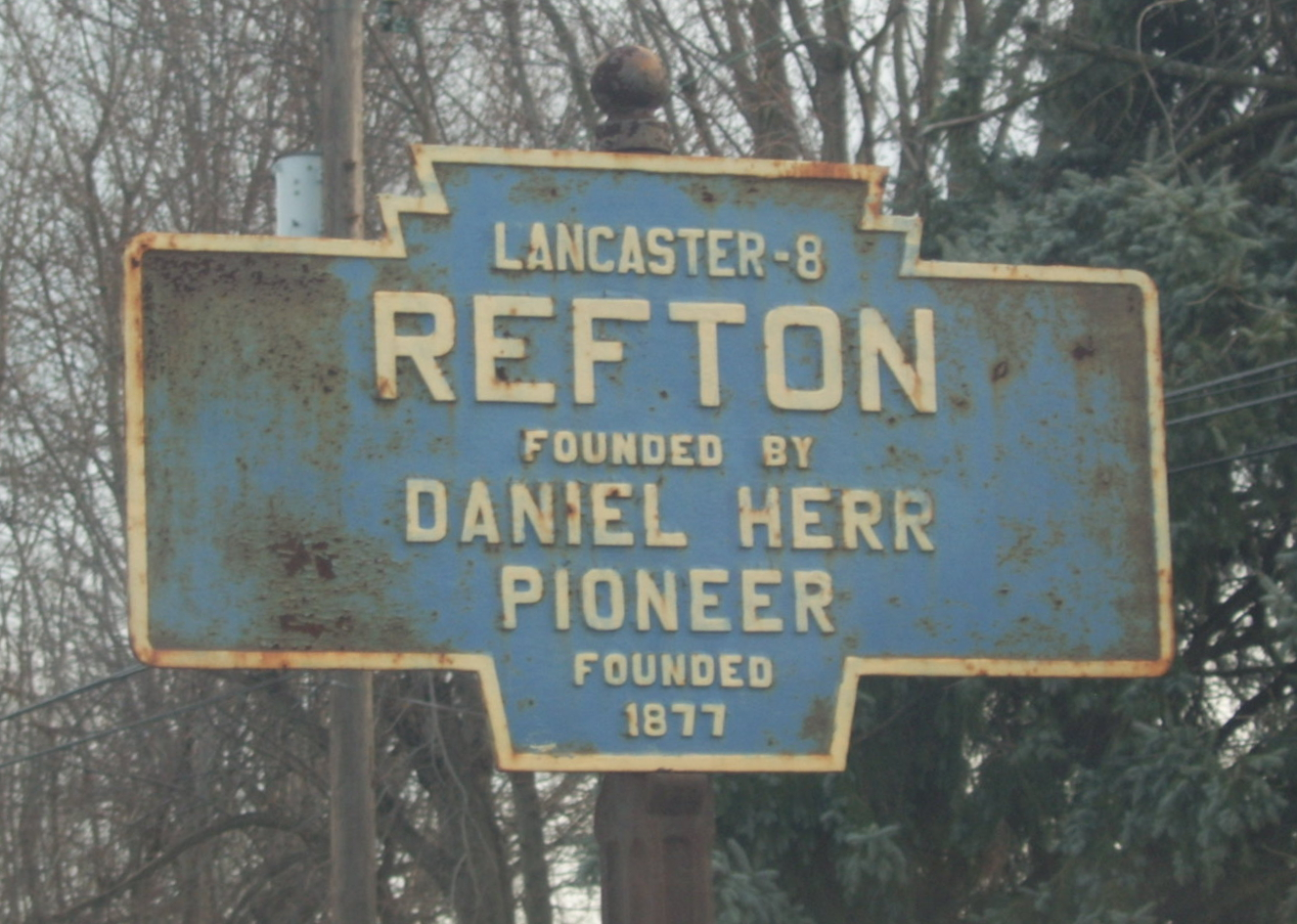
- Keystone Marker

- Location in Pennsylvania Location in the United States
- Coordinates: 39°56′50″N 76°13′58″W
- Country: United States
- State: Pennsylvania
- County: Lancaster
- Township: Strasburg

Area
  - Total: 1.22 sq mi (3.16 km^{2})
  - Land: 1.20 sq mi (3.11 km^{2})
  - Water: 0.023 sq mi (0.06 km^{2})
- Elevation: 410 ft (120 m)

Population (2020)
  - Total: 310
  - Density: 258.5/sq mi (99.79/km^{2})
- Time zone: UTC-5 (Eastern (EST))
  - Summer (DST): UTC-4 (EDT)
- ZIP code: 17560
- Area code: 717
- FIPS code: 42-64032
- GNIS feature ID: 1184859

Refton is an unincorporated community and census-designated place (CDP) in Strasburg Township, Pennsylvania, United States, with a ZIP code of 17560. The community is located along U.S. Route 222. As of the 2010 census, the population was 298.

== Geography ==
The community is in central Lancaster County, in the western corner of Strasburg Township. It is bordered to the northwest by Pequea Creek and to the southwest by its tributary, Big Beaver Creek. U.S. Route 222 passes through the northeastern side of the community, leading north 9 miles (14 km) to the center of Lancaster, the county seat, and southeast 6 miles (10 km) to Quarryville.

According to the U.S. Census Bureau, the Refton CDP has a total area of 1.2 square miles (3.2 km^{2}), of which 0.02 square miles (0.06 km^{2}), or 1.79%, are water. Via Pequea Creek the community is part of the Susquehanna River watershed.

== Demographics ==
Historical population
Census	Pop.	Note	%±
2020	310		—
U.S. Decennial Census
