= Wilbur Chocolate Company =

Chocolate company based in Lititz, Pennsylvania

Wilbur Chocolate
- Type: Brand
- Industry: Manufacturing
- Founded: 1865
- Headquarters: Lititz, Pennsylvania, U.S.
- Key people: Bryan Wurscher, President
- Products: Chocolate and confectionery ingredients
- Parent: Cargill
- Website: www.wilburbuds.com

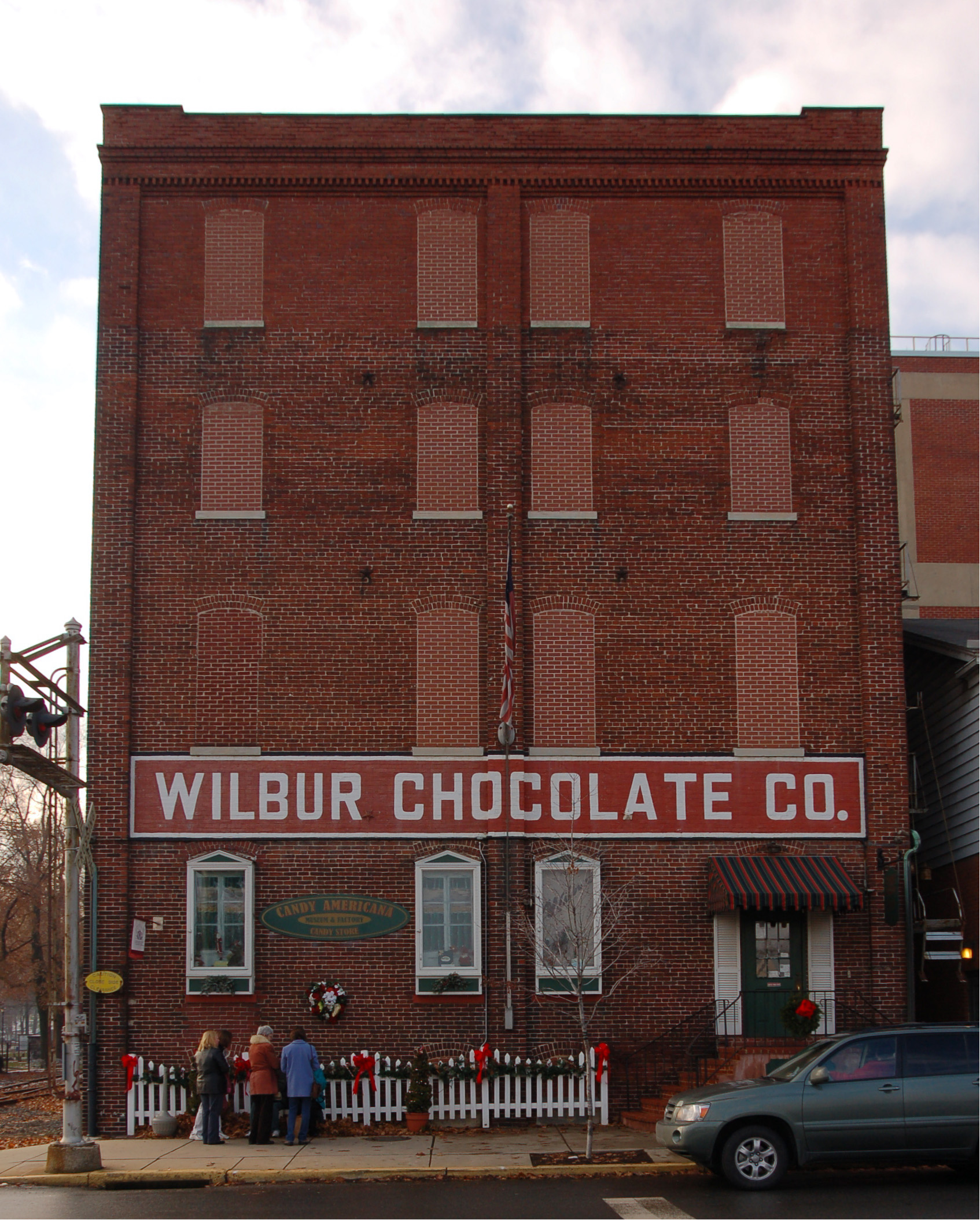

Wilbur Chocolate is one of four brands manufactured by Cargill Cocoa & Chocolate North America. Most of the Wilbur brand products were produced in plants chocolate manufacturing company located in Lititz, Pennsylvania.

== History ==
Wilbur Chocolate was founded in Philadelphia in 1865 by Henry Oscar Wilbur and Samuel Croft. Cargill Cocoa & Chocolate NA produces hundreds of millions of pounds of chocolate and confectionery products a year. These ingredients are sold to food and candy manufactures across the Americas.

The company was bought by Cargill in 1992 and is part of that company's cocoa and chocolate labels, which also includes Peter's Chocolate (bought from Nestlé in 2002), Gerkens Cacao, and Veliche Belgian chocolate

Cargill closed the downtown Lititz Wilbur Chocolate Factory in early 2016. By the summer of 2018 the former factory was being converted into condos.

== Wilbur Chocolate Candy Store and Museum ==
The company's Wilbur Chocolate Factory in Lititz sells an assortment of Wilbur chocolates and other candy, and features the free Candy Americana Museum that tells the history of the company and how their chocolate is made. The exhibits include antique chocolate molds, tins and boxes, as well as hand-painted European and Oriental antique porcelain chocolate pots. The museum was created by Penny Buzzard, wife of former Wilbur president John Buzzard, and opened in 1972.

On March 31, 2008, then Senator Barack Obama visited Wilbur Chocolate Company. Mr. Obama greeted a sizable crowd outside before venturing inside to taste-test various treats offered to the calorie-conscious candidate. The hometown newspaper, the Lititz Record Express, documented his visit with a photo gallery.

== Wilbur factory closure and redevelopment ==
In January 2016, Cargill stopped chocolate production at its historic factory and laid off approximately 130 Wilbur employees. This officially ended Wilbur's 125 years of chocolate-making at this site. According to an announcement on October 29, 2015, Cargill would "close its plant in Lititz, Penn., on Broad Street and shift production of these offerings to Cargill’s other, more modern and efficient plants in Mount Joy, Lititz (West Lincoln Avenue) and Hazleton, Penn.; Milwaukee; and Ontario, Canada."

The closed factory was redeveloped into 25 condos and a hotel. The Market at Wilbur, Blackworth Live Fire Grill, a restaurant opened August 2019, while the Wilbur Lititz, a Tapestry Collection hotel by Hilton, opened September 2019.

In December 2023, The Market at Wilbur was closed to make room for a new restaurant, owned by Blackworth Live Fire Grill. Blackworth Live Fire Grill was sold and rebranded as Kole Chophouse in March 2025. Cavolo! Pizzeria Bar opened in the former Market at Wilbur location in June 2025.

== Wilbur Buds ==
Its most popular candy, the Wilbur Bud, was introduced in 1893. Hershey's Kiss, which debuted in 1907, closely resembles a Wilbur Bud. The two products are also frequently compared due to the proximity of their manufacturers; Lititz is approximately 20 miles (32 km) from The Hershey Company's global headquarters in Hershey, Pennsylvania. Wilbur Buds are not individually wrapped, and Wilbur Buds are molded; molding allows them to have the word WILBUR on the bottom of the chocolate.

== See also ==
- List of bean-to-bar chocolate manufacturers
- List of food and beverage museums
