= Kinzers, Pennsylvania =

Unincorporated community in Pennsylvania, US

- Unincorporated community
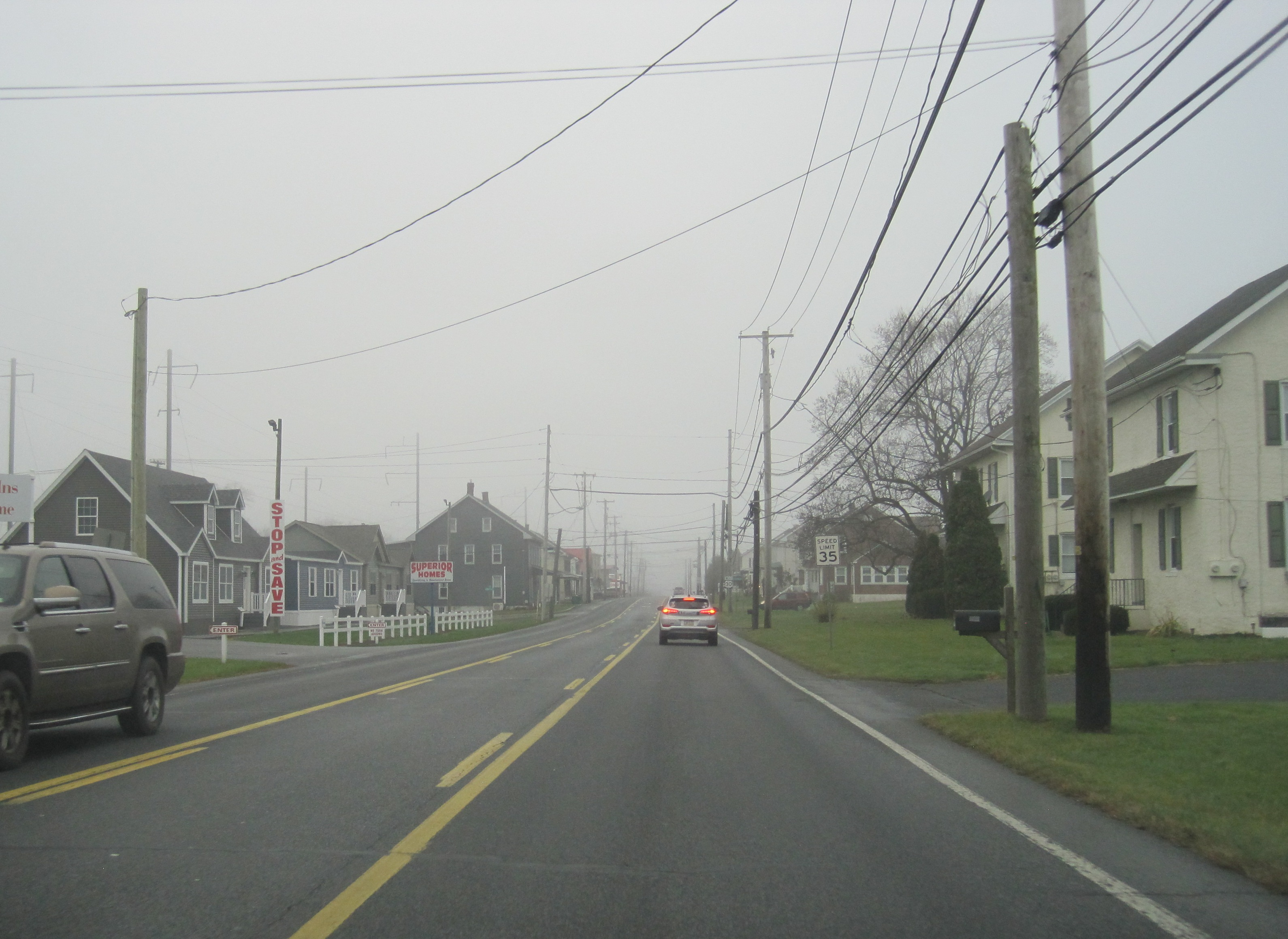
- Westbound US 30 through Kinzers
- Nickname: Kinzer
- Location within Pennsylvania Location within the United States
- Coordinates: 39°59′54″N 76°03′42″W
- Country: United States
- State: Pennsylvania
- County: Lancaster
- Townships: Paradise and Salisbury
- Named for: Harry Kinzer
- Time zone: UTC-5 (Eastern (EST))
  - Summer (DST): UTC-4 (EDT)
- ZIP code: 17535
- Area code: 717

Kinzers is an unincorporated community located in Paradise and Salisbury townships, Lancaster County, Pennsylvania, United States.

Kinzers was named after Harry Kinzer, a descendant of Palatine German settlers, and was founded in 1835. The town was originally called "Kinzer's" until July 1962, when the use of ZIP Codes became mandated, and "Kinzer's" lost its apostrophe. The compact settlement of Kinzers is primarily in Paradise Township, extending east into Salisbury Township.

Kinzers is located on U.S. Route 30 (Lincoln Highway), part of the original Philadelphia and Lancaster Turnpike.

In the Salisbury Township portion of Kinzers is the Rough and Tumble Engineers Historical Association, which is noted for its steam engine display and thresherman's reunion backtracking from the third Saturday in August to the previous Wednesday. In the Paradise Township portion of Kinzers is the Vintage Sales Stables, named for the neighboring unincorporated village of Vintage.

The Cambrian Kinzers Formation (predominantly marble and shale) is named after the town, and the type section is located at a nearby railroad cut.
