= Reinholds, Pennsylvania =

Unincorporated community in Pennsylvania, US

- Census-designated place
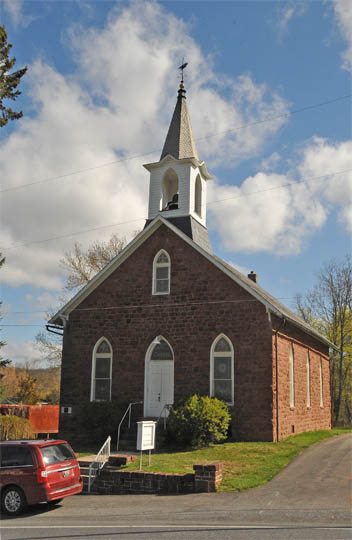
- Reinholds Station Trinity Chapel

- Location in Pennsylvania Location in the United States
- Coordinates: 40°16′00″N 76°06′56″W
- Country: United States
- State: Pennsylvania
- County: Lancaster
- Township: West Cocalico

Area
  - Total: 0.93 sq mi (2.40 km^{2})
  - Land: 0.92 sq mi (2.38 km^{2})
  - Water: 0.0039 sq mi (0.01 km^{2})
- Elevation: 460 ft (140 m)

Population (2020)
  - Total: 1,786
  - Density: 1,940.1/sq mi (749.06/km^{2})
- Time zone: UTC-5 (Eastern (EST))
  - Summer (DST): UTC-4 (EDT)
- ZIP code: 17569
- FIPS code: 42-64112
- GNIS feature ID: 1204484

Reinholds is an unincorporated community and census-designated place (CDP) in West Cocalico Township, Pennsylvania, United States. As of the 2010 census the population was 1,803.

The Reinholds Station Trinity Chapel was listed on the National Register of Historic Places in 1990.

== Geography ==
Reinholds is the northernmost census-designated place in Lancaster County. It is in eastern West Cocalico Township, with its eastern edge following the border with East Cocalico Township. Pennsylvania Route 897 is Reinholds' Main Street, leading northwest 17 miles (27 km) to Lebanon and southeast 13 miles (21 km) to East Earl.

According to the U.S. Census Bureau, the Reinholds CDP has a total area of 0.93 square miles (2.4 km^{2}), of which 0.004 square miles (0.01 km^{2}), or 0.45%, are water. Little Cocalico Creek passes through the community, flowing south to join Cocalico Creek in Denver. It is part of the Conestoga River watershed, flowing to the Susquehanna River.

== Demographics ==
Historical population
Census	Pop.	Note	%±
2020	1,786		—
U.S. Decennial Census

U.S. Census data is available for both the Reinholds census-designated place (CDP) and the larger area covered by the Reinholds ZIP code, 17569.

The Reinholds CDP has a 2017 estimated population of 1,849 with a median age of 37.7 and a median household income of $77,107 for 629 housing units. Individuals below the poverty level include 15.3% of the population; 91.1% of the population had attained a high school diploma or a higher level of education. The population includes 1,743 "white" individuals (94.3%) and 106 "American Indian and Alaska Native" individuals (5.7%).

The 17569 ZIP code covers 16.36 sq mi (42.4 km^{2}) including Reinholds plus the areas of Blainsport, Swartzville, and Vera Cruz in Lancaster County, as well as Vinemont in Berks County. The ZIP code had a 2017 estimated population of 5,837 with a median age of 36.2 and a median household income of $79,375 for 1,981 housing units. Individuals below the poverty level include 5.2% of the population; 83.5% of the population had attained a high school diploma or a higher level of education. The population includes 5,559 "white" individuals (95.2%), 136 "Asian" (2.3%), 106 "American Indian and Alaska Native"(1.8%), 36 of two or more races (0.6%), and 124 Hispanic or Latino (of any race) (2.1%).

== Notable people ==
- Mark D. McCormack, US Army major general
