= Stevens, Pennsylvania =

Unincorporated community in Pennsylvania, US

- Census-designated place
- Location in Pennsylvania Location in the United States
- Coordinates: 40°12′58″N 76°9′20″W
- Country: United States
- State: Pennsylvania
- County: Lancaster
- Townships: West Cocalico, East Cocalico

Area
  - Total: 1.56 sq mi (4.03 km^{2})
  - Land: 1.56 sq mi (4.03 km^{2})
  - Water: 0 sq mi (0.0 km^{2})
- Elevation: 382 ft (116 m)

Population (2010)
  - Total: 612
  - Density: 393/sq mi (151.8/km^{2})
- Time zone: UTC-5 (Eastern (EST))
  - Summer (DST): UTC-4 (EDT)
- ZIP code: 17578
- Area code: 717
- FIPS code: 42-74040
- GNIS feature ID: 1188622

Stevens is an unincorporated community and census-designated place (CDP) in Lancaster County, Pennsylvania, United States. As of the 2010 census, it had a population of 612. The Stevens post office has ZIP code 17578.

The community was named in honor of Thaddeus Stevens. It was originally also called "Reamstown Station", due to its being the closest railroad station to the much larger community of Reamstown. By 1899, the community was just referred to as Stevens P.O.

The Schoeneck and Reamstown Elementary Schools, in the Cocalico School District, have Stevens addresses, as do several churches and the Mount Airy Kennels.

== Geography ==
Stevens is in northern Lancaster County, on the border between East and West Cocalico townships. The township boundary follows North Line Road and South Line Road, which crosses Main Street at the center of town. Stevens is bordered to the north by the borough of Denver and to the south by Ephrata Township. The borough of Ephrata is 3 miles (5 km) to the southwest, and Lancaster, the county seat, is 16 miles (26 km) southwest of Stevens.

According to the U.S. Census Bureau, the Stevens CDP has a total area of 1.5 square miles (4.0 km^{2}), of which 0.1 acres (246 m^{2}), or 0.01%, are water. The community drains south to Cocalico Creek, a south-flowing tributary of the Conestoga River, which leads to the Susquehanna.
