= Cocalico Senior High School =

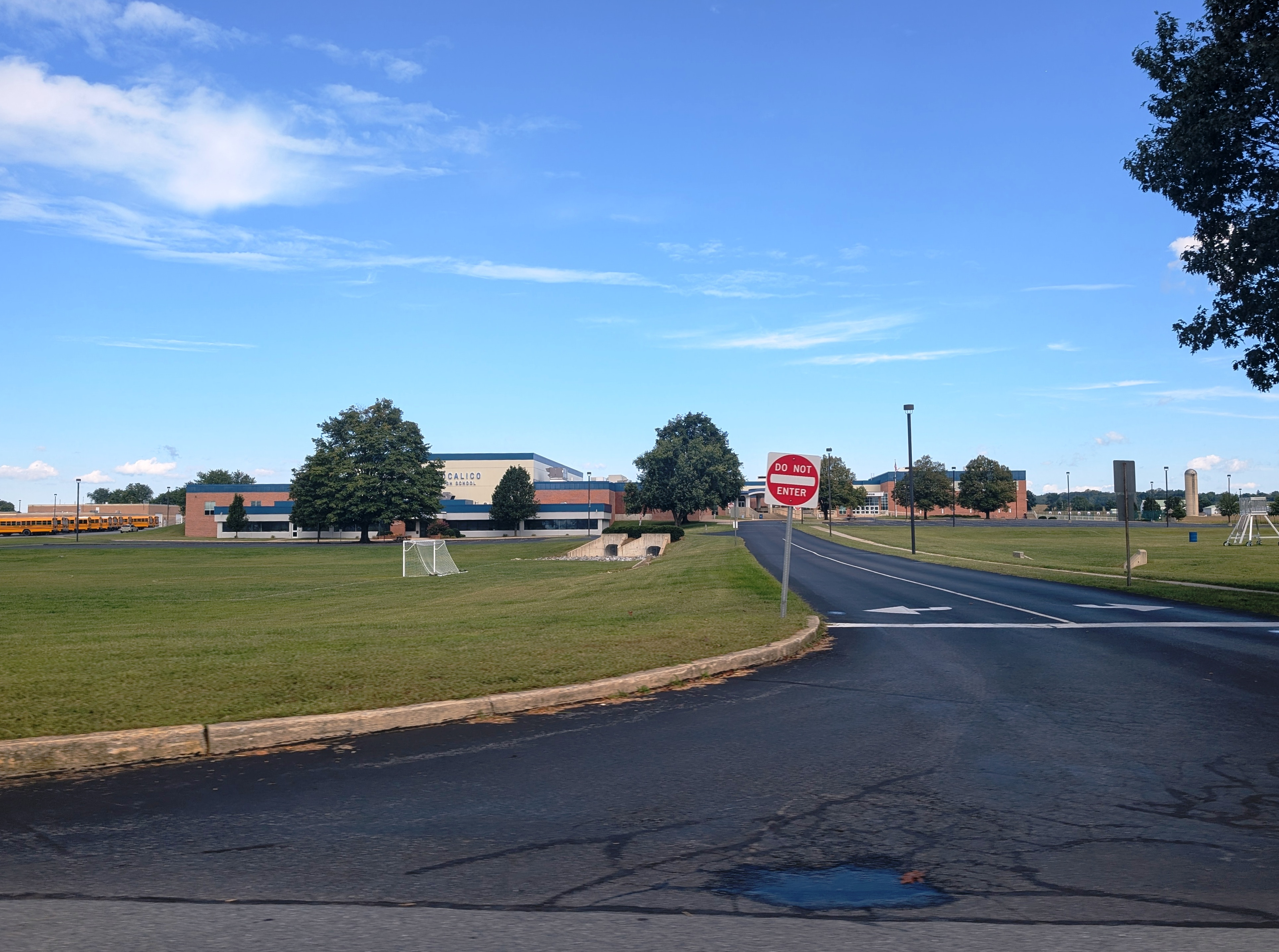

Location
- South 4th Street; Denver, Lancaster County, Pennsylvania 17517; United States; 40.2261°N 76.1548°W

Information
- School type: Secondary
- School district: Cocalico School District
- Superintendent: Ella Musser
- Principal: Scott Bennetch
- Grades: 9–12
- Enrollment: 999 (2023-2024)
- Campus type: Rural
- Colors: Royal blue and white
- Mascot: Eagle
- Newspaper: The Cocalico Chronicle
- Yearbook: The Talon
- Feeder schools: Cocalico Middle School
- Website: Website

Cocalico Senior High School is a public secondary school in Denver, Pennsylvania, United States, whose enrollment consists of students in grades 9-12. The school is part of the Cocalico School District, serving East Cocalico Township, West Cocalico Township, Denver, and Adamstown in northern Lancaster County.

== Athletics ==
- Baseball
- Basketball
- Bowling
- Cheerleading
- Cross country
- Field hockey
- Football
- Golf
- Lacrosse
- Soccer
- Softball
- Swimming
- Tennis
- Track and field
- Volleyball
- Wrestling
