= Schoeneck, Pennsylvania =

Unincorporated community in Pennsylvania, US

- Census-designated place
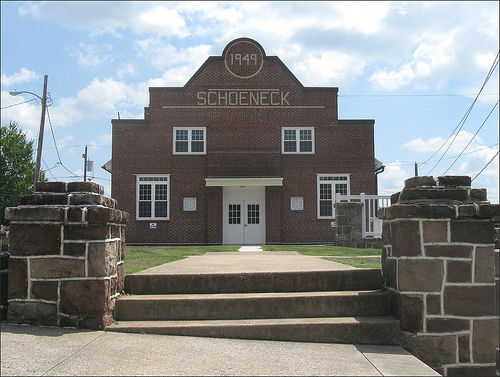
- Downtown Schoeneck

- Location in Pennsylvania Location in the United States
- Coordinates: 40°14′29″N 76°10′27″W
- Country: United States
- State: Pennsylvania
- County: Lancaster
- Township: West Cocalico

Area
  - Total: 3.12 sq mi (8.09 km^{2})
  - Land: 3.09 sq mi (8.01 km^{2})
  - Water: 0.031 sq mi (0.08 km^{2})
- Elevation: 565 ft (172 m)

Population (2010)
  - Total: 1,056
  - Density: 341/sq mi (131.8/km^{2})
- Time zone: UTC-5 (Eastern (EST))
  - Summer (DST): UTC-4 (EDT)
- ZIP code: 17578 (Stevens); 17517 (Denver)
- FIPS code: 42-68200
- GNIS feature ID: 1187093

Schoeneck (German: Schöneck) is an unincorporated community and census-designated place (CDP) that is located in West Cocalico Township, Pennsylvania, United States. The name Schoeneck is a corruption of the Pennsylvania Dutch phrase, "Schoenes Eck," which translates to "pretty corner."

As of the 2010 census, the population was 1,056.

== Geography ==
Schoeneck is located in northeastern Lancaster County, in the southern part of West Cocalico Township. It is also 5 miles (8 km) north of Ephrata and 18 miles (29 km) northeast of Lancaster, the county seat.

Interstate 76, the Pennsylvania Turnpike, passes through the northern part of the community, with the closest access 6 miles (10 km) to the east near Reamstown.

According to the U.S. Census Bureau, the Schoeneck CDP has a total area of 3.1 square miles (8.1 km^{2}), of which 0.03 square miles (0.08 km^{2}), or 0.96%, are water.

The community is drained by tributaries of Indian Run, which flows south to Cocalico Creek in Ephrata and is part of the Conestoga River watershed running eventually to the Susquehanna.

== Education ==
Schoeneck is part of the Cocalico School District. A long-time presence in Schoeneck, the Schoeneck Elementary School closed in June 2011. Schoeneck students are now transported to the Denver Elementary School.

== Community services ==
Schoeneck is home to the Schoeneck Volunteer Fire Company.

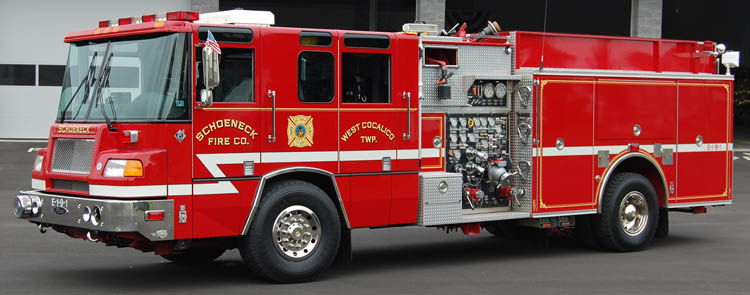
Schoeneck Fire Company Engine 1-9-1
