= Schöneck Castle =

Schöneck Castle may refer to:

- Schöneck Castle (Alsace), near Dambach in the Alsace, France
- Schöneck Castle (South Tyrol) also called Schloss Schöneck, near Kiens in the Pustertal valley, South Tyrol, Italy
- Schöneck Castle (Münstermaifeld), borough of Münstermaifeld, Rhineland-Palatinate, Germany
- Schöneck Castle (Vogtland), in the borough of Schöneck/Vogtl., Vogtlandkreis, Saxony, Germany
- Schloss Schöneck, municipality of Herschwiesen, Rhein-Hunsrück-Kreis, Germany

== See also ==
- Schöneck (disambiguation)
