= 1790 United States census =

First US census

- August 2, 1790
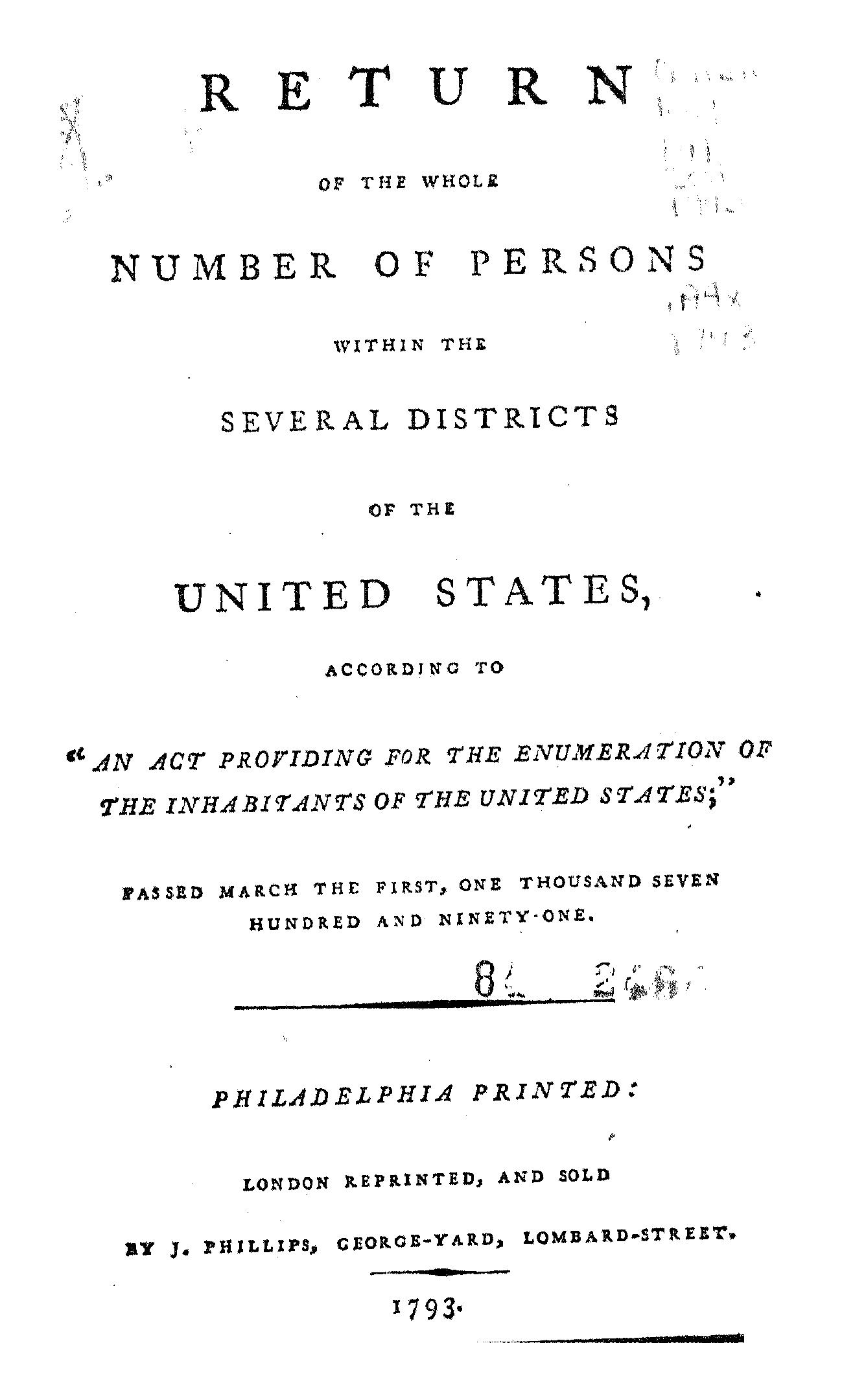
- Title page of 1790 United States census

General information
- Country: United States
- Authority: Office of the United States Marshal

Results
- Total population: 3,929,214
- Most populous state: Virginia (747,610)
- Least populous state: Delaware (59,094)

The 1790 United States census was the first United States census. It recorded the population of the whole United States as of Census Day, August 2, 1790, as mandated by Article 1, Section 2, of the Constitution and applicable laws. In the first census, the population of the United States was enumerated to be 3,929,214 inhabitants.

Congress assigned responsibility for the 1790 census to the marshals of United States judicial districts under an act, which with minor modifications and extensions, governed census taking through the 1840 census. "The law required that every household be visited, that completed census schedules be posted in 'two of the most public places within [each jurisdiction], there to remain for the inspection of all concerned...' and that 'the aggregate amount of each description of persons' for every district be transmitted to the president."

The census was published in 1791. It was 56 pages and cost $44,377.28.

== Contemporary perception ==
Both Secretary of State Thomas Jefferson and President George Washington expressed skepticism over the results, believing that the true population had been undercounted. If indeed an undercount was the result, possible explanations for it include dispersed population, poor transportation links, limitations of contemporary technology, and individual refusal to participate.

== Questions ==
1. Name of the head of family
2. Number of free white males age 16 and over
3. Number of free white males under age 16
4. Number of free white females
5. Number of all other free persons (excluding slaves)
6. Number of slaves

== Loss and availability of data ==
Although the census was proved statistically factual, based on data collected, the records for several states (including Delaware, Georgia, New Jersey, and Virginia) were lost sometime between 1790 and 1830. Almost one-third of the original census data have been lost or destroyed since their original documentation. These include some 1790 data from Connecticut, Maine, Maryland, Massachusetts, New Hampshire, New York, North Carolina, Pennsylvania, Rhode Island, South Carolina, and Vermont; the validity and existence of most of these data, though, can be confirmed in many secondary sources pertaining to the first census.

No microdata from the 1790 population census are available, but aggregate data for small areas, together with compatible cartographic boundary files, can be downloaded from the National Historical Geographic Information System.

== Data ==
Under the direction of the Secretary of State Thomas Jefferson, marshals collected data from all thirteen states (Connecticut, Delaware, Georgia, Maryland, Massachusetts including the District of Maine, New Hampshire, New Jersey, New York, North Carolina, Pennsylvania, Rhode Island, South Carolina, and Virginia), and from the Southwest Territory (the northeastern portion of present-day Tennessee). The census was not conducted in Vermont until 1791, after that state's admission to the Union as the 14th state on March 4 of that year. (From 1777 until early 1791, and hence during all of 1790, Vermont was a de facto independent country whose government took the position that Vermont was not then a part of the United States.) No enumeration at all was taken of the Northwest Territory, apparently because of logistical difficulties covering the territory (which was vast but sparsely populated by enumerated American Whites), as well as the continued presence of British Army garrisons in the forts along the Great Lakes.

At 17.8 percent, the 1790 census's proportion of slaves to the free population was the highest ever recorded by any census of the United States.

State or territory	Free white males of 16 years and upward (Note: Heads of families were included.)	Free white males under 16 years	Free white females	All other free persons	Slaves	Slaves % of state population	Total	% of U.S. population
Vermont	22,435	22,328	40,505	255	16 (Note: 0 is the correct figure, and the 16 here should be added to the "All other free persons" column. When the census of 1790 was published in 1791, it reported 16 slaves, which were illegal in Vermont. An examination of the original manuscript by the Census Bureau superintendent found that 16 “free colored” person were classified as "slave" in Bennington County. See the history of slavery in Vermont.)	0.0%	85,539 (Note: Corrected figures are 85,425, or 114 less than figures published in 1790, due to an error of addition of several towns.)	2.2%
New Hampshire	36,086	34,851	70,160	630	158	0.1%	141,885	3.6%
Maine	24,384	24,748	46,870	538	0	0.0%	96,540	2.4%
Massachusetts	95,453	87,289	190,582	5,463	0	0.0%	378,787	9.8%
Rhode Island	16,019	15,799	32,652	3,407	948	1.4%	68,825	1.7%
Connecticut	60,523	54,403	117,448	2,808	2,764	1.2%	237,946	6.0%
New York	83,700	78,122	152,320	4,654	21,324	6.3%	340,120	8.6%
New Jersey	45,251	41,416	83,287	2,762	11,423	6.2%	184,139	4.6%
Pennsylvania	110,788	106,948	206,363	6,537	3,737	0.9%	434,373	11.0%
Delaware	11,783	12,143	22,384	3,899	8,887	15.0%	59,094 (Note: Corrected figures are 59,096, or 2 more than figures published in 1790, due to error in addition.)	1.5%
Maryland	55,915	51,339	101,395	8,043	103,036	32.2%	319,728	8.1%
Virginia	110,936	116,135	215,046	12,866	292,627	39.1%	747,610 (Note: The figures for Virginia do not include the population of Kentucky. Though Kentucky was then a part of Virginia, the Kentucky figures were compiled separately, and are shown on the line for Kentucky. The Virginia figures do include the portion of Virginia that later became the state of West Virginia.)	18.9%
Kentucky	15,154	17,057	28,922	114	12,430	16.9%	73,677	1.9%
North Carolina	69,988	77,506	140,710	4,975	100,572	25.5%	393,751	9.9%
South Carolina	35,576	37,722	66,880	1,801	107,094	43.0%	249,073	6.3%
Georgia	13,103	14,044	25,739	398	29,264	35.5%	82,548	2.1%
Southwest Territory	6,271	10,277	15,365	361	3,417	9.6%	35,691	0.9%
Total	813,365	802,127	1,556,628	59,511	697,697	17.8%	3,929,326	100%

== Urban centers ==
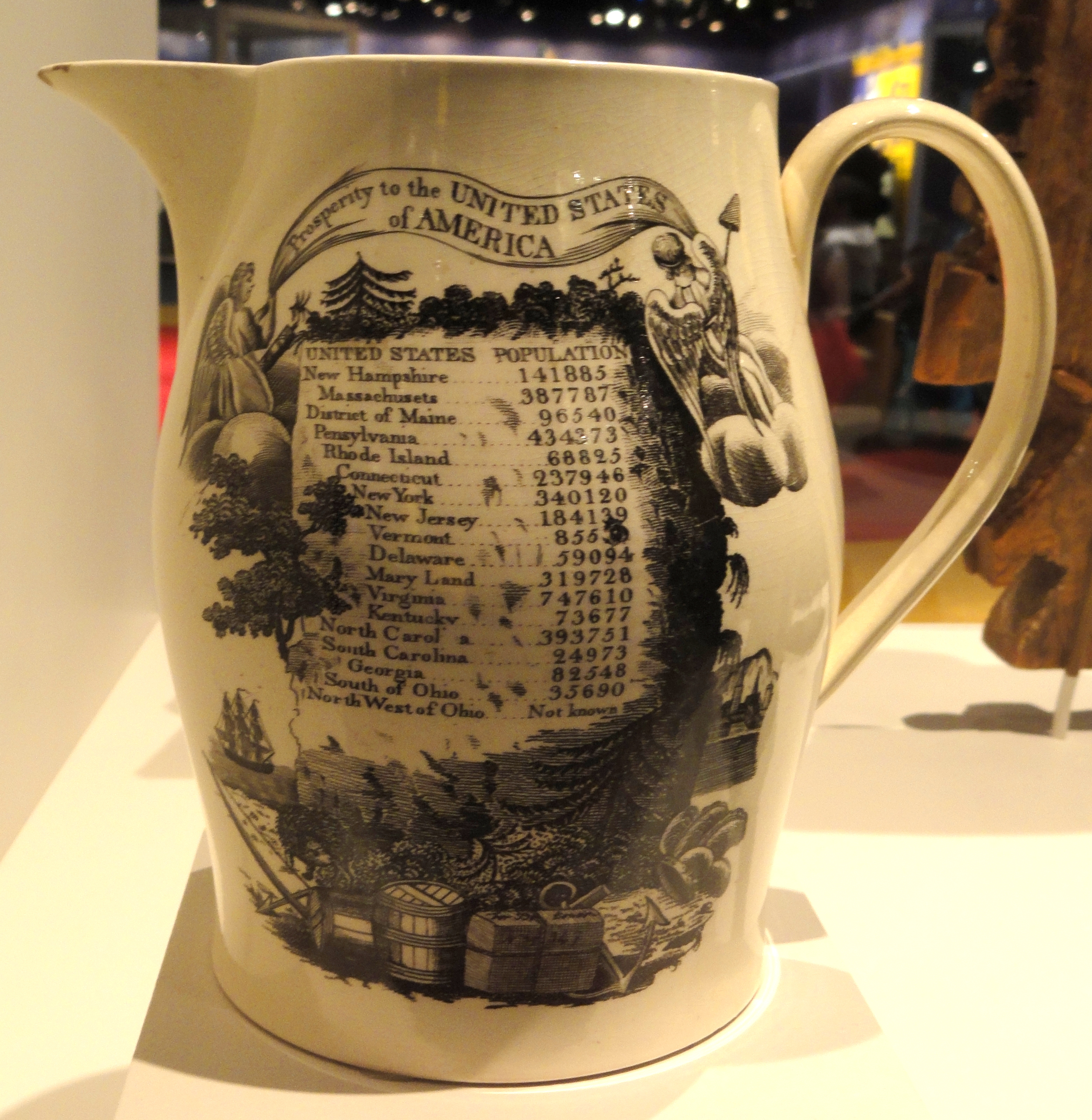
Commemorative pitcher with census results

Cities and towns by population
City	State	Population	Region (2016)	Population (2020)
New York	New York	33,131	Northeast	1,694,251 [Manhattan only]
Philadelphia	Pennsylvania	28,522	Northeast	69,433 [Center City only]
Boston	Massachusetts	18,320	Northeast	675,647
Charleston	South Carolina	16,359	South	150,227
Baltimore	Maryland	13,503	South	585,708
Norwalk	Connecticut	11,942	Northeast	91,184
Northern Liberties	Pennsylvania	9,913	Northeast	—N/a
Rensselaerswyck	New York	8,318	Northeast	—N/a
Salem	Massachusetts	7,921	Northeast	44,480
Watervliet	New York	7,419	Northeast	10,375
Ballston	New York	7,333	Northeast	11,831
Stephentown	New York	6,795	Northeast	2,791
Newport	Rhode Island	6,716	Northeast	25,163
Canaan	New York	6,692	Northeast	1,570
Providence	Rhode Island	6,380	Northeast	190,934
Canajoharie	New York	6,156	Northeast	3,660
Fishkill	New York	5,941	Northeast	24,226
Frederickstown	New York	5,932	Northeast	11,541
Marblehead	Massachusetts	5,661	Northeast	20,441
Southwark	Pennsylvania	5,661	Northeast	—N/a
Middletown	Connecticut	5,375	Northeast	47,717
Gloucester	Massachusetts	5,317	Northeast	29,729
Amwell	New Jersey	5,201	Northeast	—N/a
Washington	New York	5,189	Northeast	4,522
Cambridge	New York	4,996	Northeast	1,952
Bridgewater	Massachusetts	4,975	Northeast	28,633
Newburyport	Massachusetts	4,837	Northeast	18,289
Haverstraw	New York	4,826	Northeast	39,087
Portsmouth	New Hampshire	4,720	Northeast	21,956
Rehoboth	Massachusetts	4,710	Northeast	12,502
Shrewsbury	New Jersey	4,673	Northeast	1,076
Kinderhook	New York	4,661	Northeast	8,330
Clinton	New York	4,607	Northeast	4,037
Livingston	New York	4,594	Northeast	3,628
Ipswich	Massachusetts	4,562	Northeast	13,785
Hillsdale	New York	4,556	Northeast	1,831
Sherburne	Massachusetts	4,555	Northeast	14,255
Middleborough	Massachusetts	4,526	Northeast	24,245
New Haven	Connecticut	4,484	Northeast	135,081
Mohawk	New York	4,440	Northeast	3,572
Pawling	New York	4,330	Northeast	8,012
Caughnawaga	New York	4,261	Northeast	—N/a
New Cornwall	New York	4,225	Northeast	12,884
Lebanon	Connecticut	4,166	Northeast	7,142
South Kingstown	Rhode Island	4,131	Northeast	31,913
Oyster Bay	New York	4,097	Northeast	301,332
Hartford	Connecticut	4,090	Northeast	121,054
Glocester	Rhode Island	4,025	Northeast	9,974
Fairfield	Connecticut	4,009	Northeast	61,512
Newbury	Massachusetts	3,972	Northeast	6,716
Kingston	New York	3,929	Northeast	24,069
Berwick	Massachusetts	3,894	Northeast	7,950
South Hempstead	New York	3,828	Northeast	793,409
Wethersfield	Connecticut	3,806	Northeast	27,298
Taunton	Massachusetts	3,804	Northeast	59,408
Lower Freehold	New Jersey	3,785	Northeast	35,369
Lancaster	Pennsylvania	3,773	Northeast	58,039
Richmond	Virginia	3,761	South	226,610
Rhinebeck	New York	3,662	Northeast	7,548
Warwick	New York	3,603	Northeast	32,027
Halfmoon	New York	3,602	Northeast	25,662
Beekman	New York	3,597	Northeast	14,172
Montgomery	New York	3,563	Northeast	23,322
Woodbridge	New Jersey	3,520	Northeast	103,639
Albany	New York	3,498	Northeast	99,224
Schenectady	New York	3,472	Northeast	67,047
Guilford	Connecticut	3,460	Northeast	22,073
Upper Freehold	New Jersey	3,442	Northeast	7,273
Southampton	New York	3,408	Northeast	69,036
Coxsackie	New York	3,406	Northeast	8,382
Palatine	New York	3,404	Northeast	3,240
North East	New York	3,401	Northeast	2,971
Wallingford	Connecticut	3,375	Northeast	44,396
New Bedford	Massachusetts	3,313	Northeast	102,882
Beverly	Massachusetts	3,290	Northeast	42,670
Claverack	New York	3,262	Northeast	6,058
Huntington	New York	3,260	Northeast	204,127
Kittery	Massachusetts	3,259	Northeast	10,070
Stratford	Connecticut	3,241	Northeast	52,355
Saybrook	Connecticut	3,233	Northeast	4,415
Chatham	Connecticut	3,230	Northeast	12,717
Middletown	New Jersey	3,225	Northeast	67,106
Brookhaven	New York	3,224	Northeast	485,773
Southold	New York	3,219	Northeast	23,732
Smithfield	Rhode Island	3,171	Northeast	22,118
Watertown	Connecticut	3,170	Northeast	22,105
New Milford	Connecticut	3,167	Northeast	28,115
Greenwich	Connecticut	3,132	Northeast	63,518
Brookfield	Massachusetts	3,100	Northeast	3,439
Amenia	New York	3,078	Northeast	3,769
Saratoga	New York	3,071	Northeast	5,808
Stillwater	New York	3,071	Northeast	9,022
Wells	Massachusetts	3,070	Northeast	11,314
Earl	Pennsylvania	3,051	Northeast	7,149
Hoosick	New York	3,035	Northeast	6,711
Danbury	Connecticut	3,030	Northeast	86,518
Cocalico	Pennsylvania	3,027	Northeast	—N/a
East Hartford	Connecticut	3,016	Northeast	51,045
Plymouth	Massachusetts	2,995	Northeast	61,217
Derby	Connecticut	2,994	Northeast	12,325
Falmouth	Massachusetts	2,994	Northeast	12,444

== Images ==
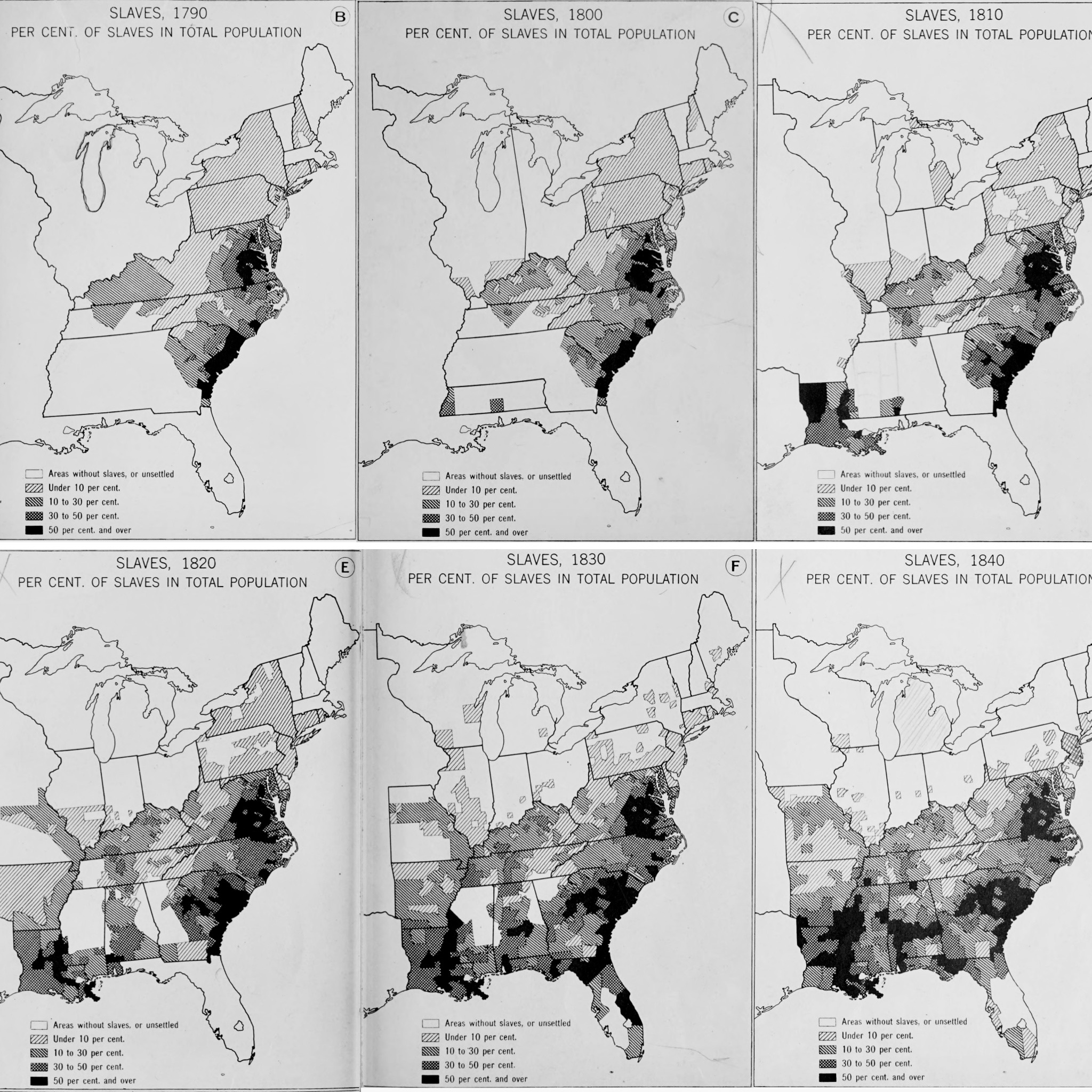
Slaves as a percentage of the total population from 1790 to 1840.
