= Schoeneck =

Schoeneck is a toponym of German origin, meaning "beautiful corner". It may refer to:

== People ==
- Charles A. Schoeneck Jr. (1912–1989), New York politician
- Charles C. Schoeneck, New York assemblyman in 1898 and 1899, see 121st New York State Legislature
- Edward Schoeneck (1875–1951), Lieutenant Governor of New York
- Jumbo Schoeneck (1862–1930), American baseball player

== Places ==
- Schoeneck, Pennsylvania
- Schœneck, town in France

== See also ==
- Schöneck (disambiguation)
