= Samuel Bentz =

American painter

Samuel Bentz (1792–1850) was an American fraktur artist.

A native of Cocalico, Lancaster County, Pennsylvania, Bentz was the son of Reverend Peter Bentz and Anna Maria Caffroth Bentz; his father, an itinerant farmer, joiner, and unordained Lutheran preacher, committed suicide in 1818, and his mother was forced to raise him on her own. He became a schoolmaster in the vicinity of Ephrata. Shortly before his death, Peter had established a school on the family land, and Samuel taught there for much of his life, living in the school building. Much of his fraktur was birth records, which he produced to augment his income. Some pieces refer to Mount Pleasant, and Bentz was designated the "Mount Pleasant Artist" until a bookplate with his signature was discovered. At his death, he left behind a box with eighteen frakturs. Much of Bentz's work is distinguished by its bold lines and the use of architectural elements as decoration, almost Greek Revival in style. Sometimes a human face is included; more often, a clock face, with its implications of memento mori, will appear. Sometimes he wrote the tetragrammaton into his paintings, an unusual inclusion for a fraktur artist, especially given his background as a member of the Reformed Church. Also unusually, he rarely included Bible verses in his work.

Six works by Bentz are in the collection of the Winterthur Museum, including a cutout piece. His work has also been forged.
