= Henry Walter House =

Historic house in Pennsylvania, United States

- U.S. National Register of Historic Places
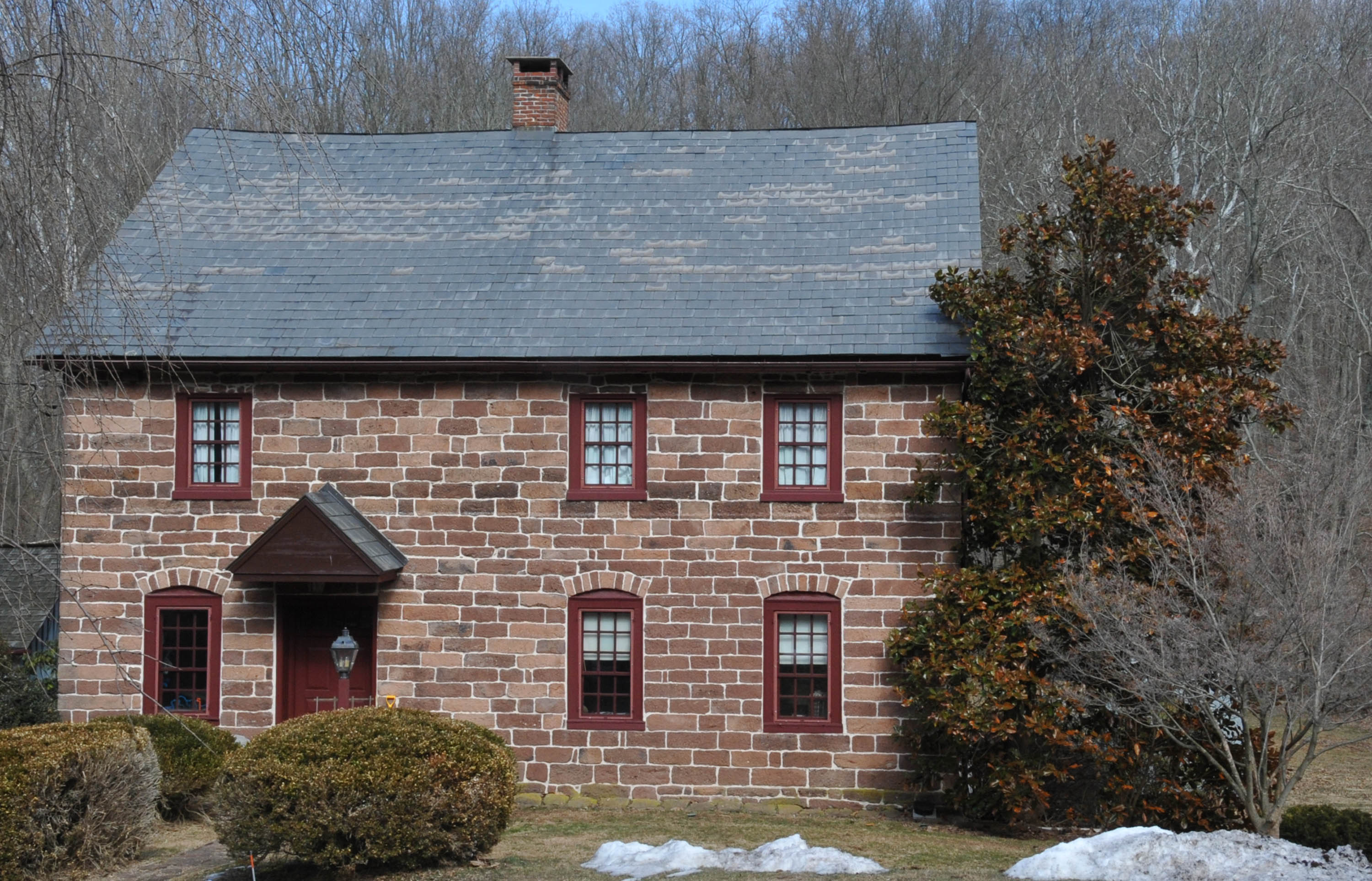

- Location within Pennsylvania Location within the United States
- Location: Greenville Road, West Cocalico Township, Pennsylvania
- Coordinates: 40°16′14″N 76°9′17″W
- Area: 8 acres (3.2 ha)
- Built: c. 1750–1768
- Built by: Walter, Henry
- NRHP reference No.: 84003449
- Added to NRHP: July 26, 1984

The Henry Walter House is an American historic home which located in West Cocalico Township, Lancaster County, Pennsylvania.

It was listed on the National Register of Historic Places in 1984.

== History and architectural features ==
Roughly built between 1750 and 1768, this historic structure is a two-story, rectangular, banked, sandstone dwelling, which was designed in a Germanic style. It has a gable roof and features precise cut stone masonry, with a polychromatic effect from differing shades of brown and red sandstone. Also located on the property is a contributing stone and frame bank barn, with portions that may pre-date 1815.
