= Furnace Hills Tenant House =

Historic house in Pennsylvania, United States

- U.S. National Register of Historic Places
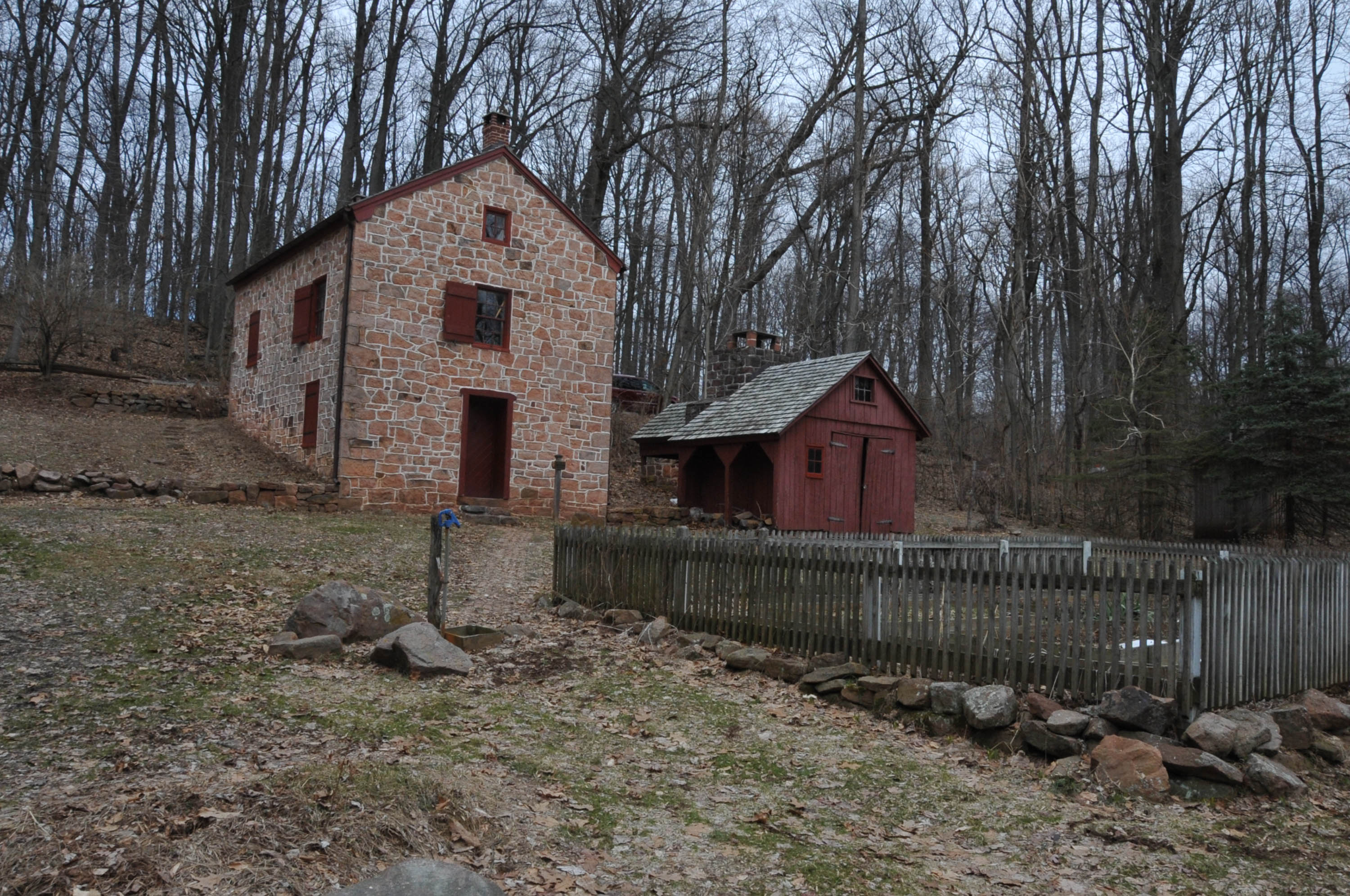

- Location within Pennsylvania Location within the United States
- Location: Unpaved Rd approx. 500 ft. E of Project Dr., West Cocalico Township, Pennsylvania
- Coordinates: 40°15′55″N 76°12′21″W
- Area: 6 acres (2.4 ha)
- Architectural style: Penn. German Bankhouse
- NRHP reference No.: 05000451
- Added to NRHP: May 20, 2005

Furnace Hills Tenant House, also known as Kurtz House and Foxfire House, is a historic home located at West Cocalico Township, Lancaster County, Pennsylvania. It is a 1 1/2 to 2 1/2-story, banked sandstone dwelling, built c. 1830–1850. It is considered to be in a vernacular Pennsylvania German perpendicular bankhouse style. It measures 19 feet wide and 26 feet deep and has a gable roof. Also on the property is a contributing stone stable, also built c. 1830–1850. The stable has a frame barn addition built in the 1930s.

It is owned by the Girl Scouts in the Heart of Pennsylvania as a part of Camp Furnace Hills.

It was listed on the National Register of Historic Places in 2005.
