= Cocalico School District =

School district in Pennsylvania

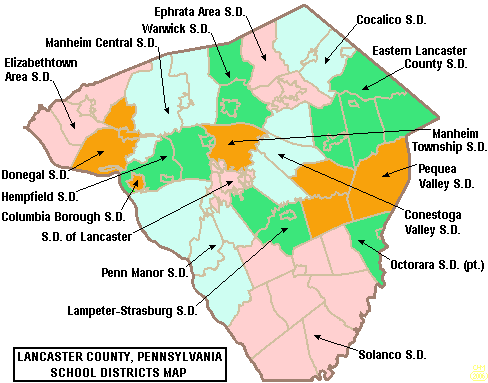
- Map of Lancaster County, Pennsylvania public school districts. Cocalico School District is in light blue at the very top (north-most) corner of the map.

Address
- South Fourth Street, P.O. Box 800 Denver, Lancaster County, Pennsylvania, 17517; United States

District information
- Type: Public

Students and staff
- District mascot: Eagles
- Colors: Royal blue, white

Other information
- Website: www.cocalico.org

The Cocalico School District is a small, suburban public school district located in Lancaster County, Pennsylvania in the United States. The school district covers the boroughs of Denver and Adamstown and East Cocalico Township and West Cocalico Township. Cocalico School District encompasses approximately 51 square miles (130 km^{2}) square miles. According to 2008 local census data, it served a resident population of 21,095 people. Per 2011, US Census Bureau data, it serves a resident population of 21,115 people. The educational attainment levels for the Cocalico School District population (25 years old and over) were 80.9% high school graduates and 16% college graduates. In 2009, the district residents’ per capita income was $20,736, while the median family income was $54,850. In the Commonwealth, the median family income was $49,501 and the United States median family income was $49,445, in 2010. In Lancaster County, the median household income was $54,765. By 2013, the median household income in the United States rose to $52,100.

Cocalico School District operates Cocalico Senior High School and Cocalico Middle School. It also operates three Elementary Schools: Adamstown Elementary School, Denver Elementary School and Reamstown Elementary School. Schoeneck Elementary was closed in June 2011, a controversial move that garnered local media attention. Cocalico Senior High School students may attend Lancaster County Career and Technology Center for training in the construction and mechanical trades. The Lancaster-Lebanon Intermediate Unit IU13 provides the district with a wide variety of services like specialized education for disabled students and hearing, speech and visual disability services, and professional development for staff and faculty.
