= Swartzville, Pennsylvania =

Unincorporated community in Pennsylvania, US

- Census-designated place
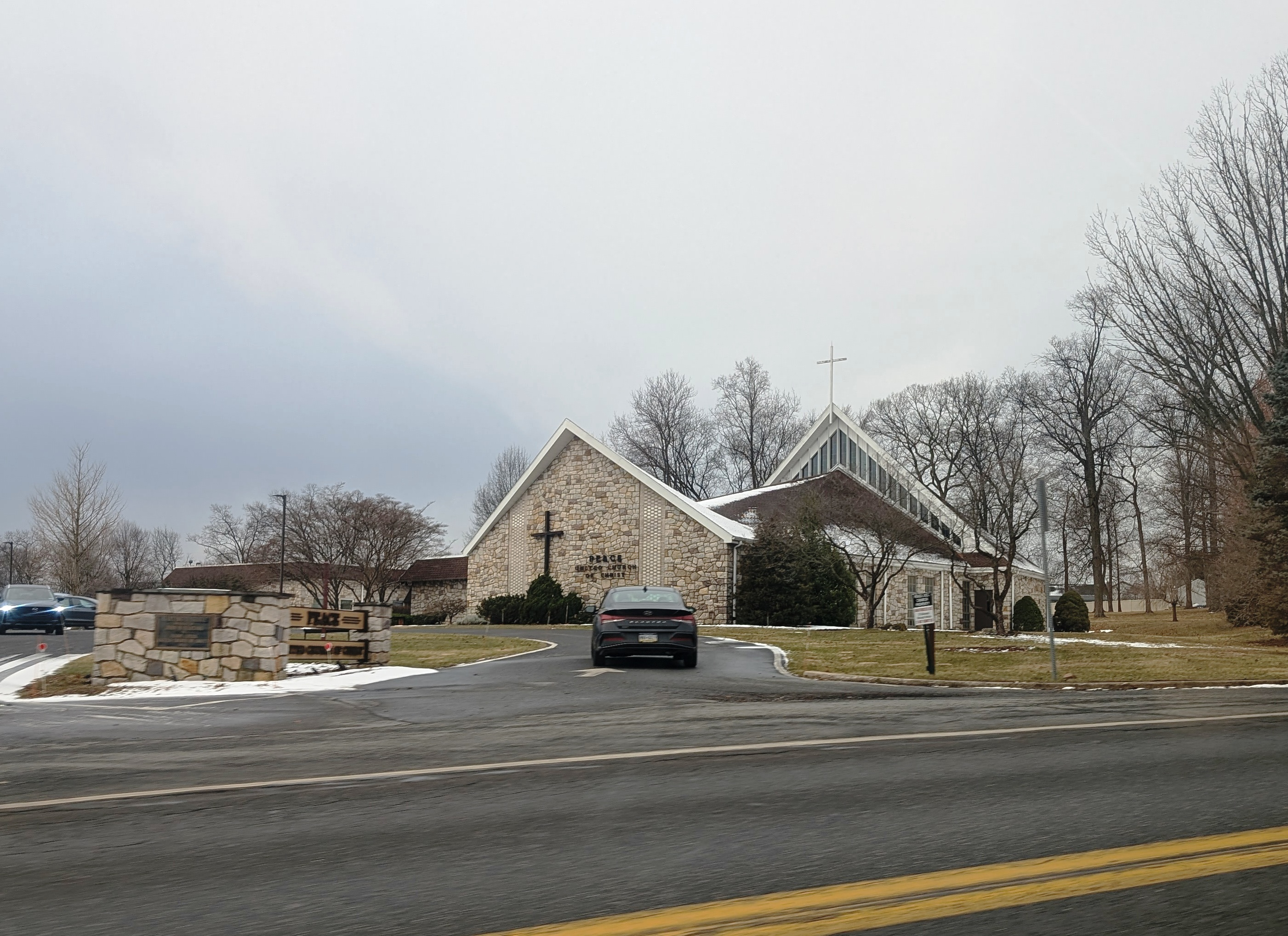
- Peace United Church of Christ in Swartzville

- Location within Pennsylvania Location within the United States
- Country: United States
- State: Pennsylvania
- County: Lancaster
- Township: East Cocalico

Area
  - Total: 1.46 sq mi (3.79 km^{2})
  - Land: 1.46 sq mi (3.78 km^{2})
  - Water: 0.0077 sq mi (0.02 km^{2})
- Elevation: 562 ft (171 m)

Population (2010)
  - Total: 2,283
  - Density: 1,566/sq mi (604.8/km^{2})
- Time zone: UTC-5 (Eastern (EST))
  - Summer (DST): UTC-4 (EDT)
- ZIP code: 17569
- FIPS code: 42-75664
- GNIS feature ID: 1204782

Swartzville is an unincorporated community and census-designated place (CDP) in East Cocalico Township, Pennsylvania, United States. As of the 2010 census, the population was 2,283.

== Geography ==
Swartzville is in northeastern Lancaster County, in the northeast part of East Cocalico Township. It is bordered to the northeast by the borough of Adamstown, to the southeast by the U.S. Route 222 freeway, and to the southwest by Interstate 76, the Pennsylvania Turnpike. Pennsylvania Route 272 (North Reading Road) passes through the community, leading northeast through Adamstown 2.5 miles (4.0 km) to US-222 and southwest 6 miles (10 km) to Ephrata. Pennsylvania Route 897 (Swartzville Road) crosses PA 272 in the center of Swartzville, leading northwest 3.5 miles (5.6 km) to Reinholds and south 6 miles (10 km) to Terre Hill. Via US 222, Lancaster, the county seat, is 21 miles (34 km) to the southwest and Reading is 12 miles (19 km) to the northeast. Exit 266 on the Pennsylvania Turnpike is 2 miles (3 km) south of Swartzville.

According to the U.S. Census Bureau, the Swartzville CDP has a total area of 1.5 square miles (3.8 km^{2}), of which 0.01 square miles (0.02 km^{2}), or 0.48%, are water. The west side of Swartzville drains via Stony Run to Cocalico Creek, and the east side drains to Little Muddy Creek, a tributary of Muddy Creek. Cocalico and Muddy creeks both flow southwest to the Conestoga River, part of the Susquehanna River watershed.
