= Reinholds Station Trinity Chapel =

- U.S. National Register of Historic Places
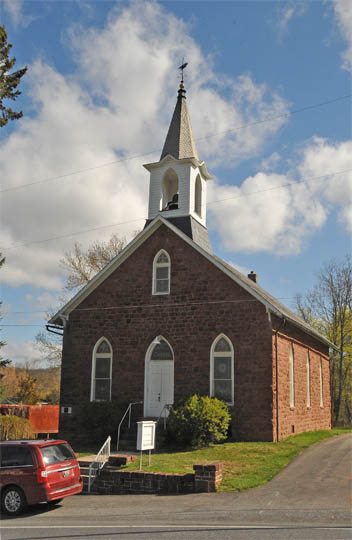

- Location within Pennsylvania Location within the United States
- Location: 114 E. Main St., Reinholds, West Cocalico Township, Pennsylvania
- Coordinates: 40°15′57″N 76°6′45″W
- Area: 1 acre (0.40 ha)
- Built: 1898
- Architectural style: Gothic
- NRHP reference No.: 90001412
- Added to NRHP: September 5, 1990

Reinholds Station Trinity Chapel is an historic Sunday School chapel that is located at 114 East Main Street in Reinholds, Pennsylvania, West Cocalico Township, Lancaster County, Pennsylvania, United States.

It was listed on the National Register of Historic Places in 1990.

== History and architectural features ==
Built in 1898, this historic structure is a 1 1/2-story, red sandstone building that was designed in the Late Gothic Revival style. It is rectangular and measures thirty-two feet wide by fifty-two feet deep, and has a steeply pitched gable roof that is topped by a Gothic steeple with belfry and weather vane. It was built as a Union Sunday School chapel for Lutheran and Reformed congregations.
