= Blainsport, Pennsylvania =

Unincorporated community in Pennsylvania, US

Coordinates: 40°16′50″N 76°08′23″W

Blainsport is an unincorporated community located within West Cocalico Township in Lancaster County, Pennsylvania, United States.

== History ==
Blainsport was originally known as Reinholdsville and appeared on the 1851 map of Lancaster County and the 1858 James D. Scott map of Lancaster County. In the Bridgen's 1864 Lancaster County Atlas and in the 1875 Everts and Stewart Combination Atlas Map of Lancaster County, it appeared as Reinholdsville PO.

In 1884, residents of Reinholdsville petitioned the US Post Office Department to rename the town Blainsport after US Republican presidential candidate James G. Blaine, according to The Lancaster Examiner (Lancaster, Pennsylvania, Wednesday, July 2, 1884, Page 6). The US Post Office Department approved the name, but changed it to Blainsport, dropping the "e." Subsequent newspaper articles continued to spell the name as Blainesport well into the 20th century.
