= Cocalico, Pennsylvania =

Unincorporated community in Pennsylvania, US

Cocalico, Pennsylvania Cocaelico (Pennsylvania German)
- Unincorporated community
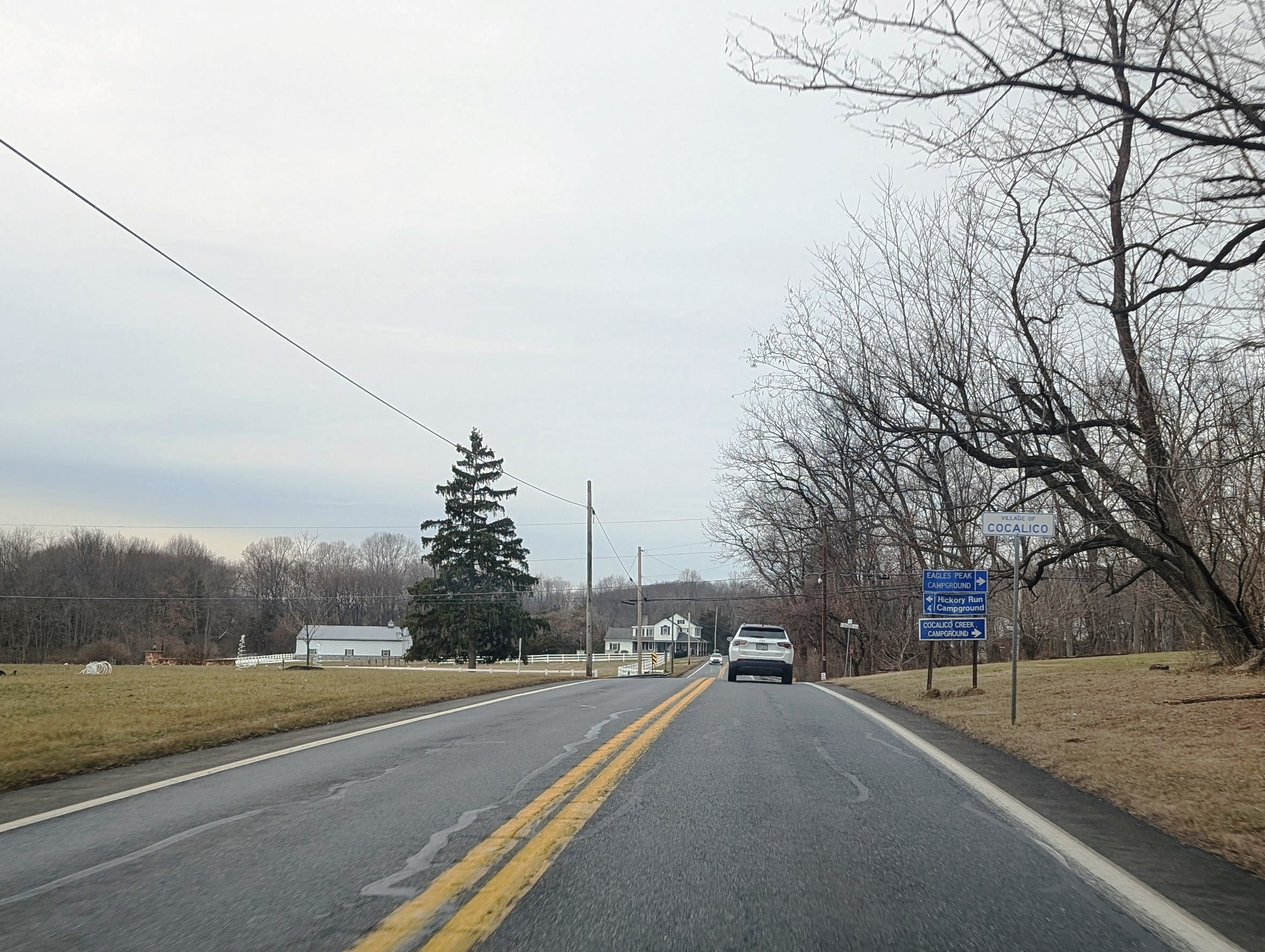
- Northbound PA 897 entering Cocalico

- Location within Pennsylvania Location within the United States
- Coordinates: 40°17′19″N 76°12′12″W
- Country: United States
- State: Pennsylvania
- County: Lancaster
- Township: West Cocalico
- Elevation: 558 ft (170 m)
- Time zone: UTC-5 (Eastern (EST))
  - Summer (DST): UTC-4 (EDT)
- GNIS feature ID: 1203294

Cocalico (Pennsylvania German: Cocaelico) is an unincorporated community located within West Cocalico Township in Lancaster County, Pennsylvania, United States. Cocalico is located at the junction of Pennsylvania Route 897 and Cocalico Road.

== Etymology ==
The name is said to be derived from an Indian word, "Koch-Hale-Kung", meaning den of snakes. Snakes were common along the Cocalico Creek. The name may also be an Anglicization of the French word "coquelicot", meaning poppy.

== Notable person ==
- Samuel Bentz, fraktur artist
