= Schöneck =

Schöneck may refer to:

- Schöneck, Hesse, town in Germany
- Schöneck, Saxony, town in Germany
- Schœneck, municipality in Lorraine, France
- Skarszewy (former German: Schöneck), Poland
- Schönig or Schöneck, German Renaissance printing family

== See also ==
- Schoeneck (disambiguation)
