= Denver, Pennsylvania =

Borough in Pennsylvania, US

Denver, Pennsylvania Bucherdaal (Pennsylvania German)
- Borough
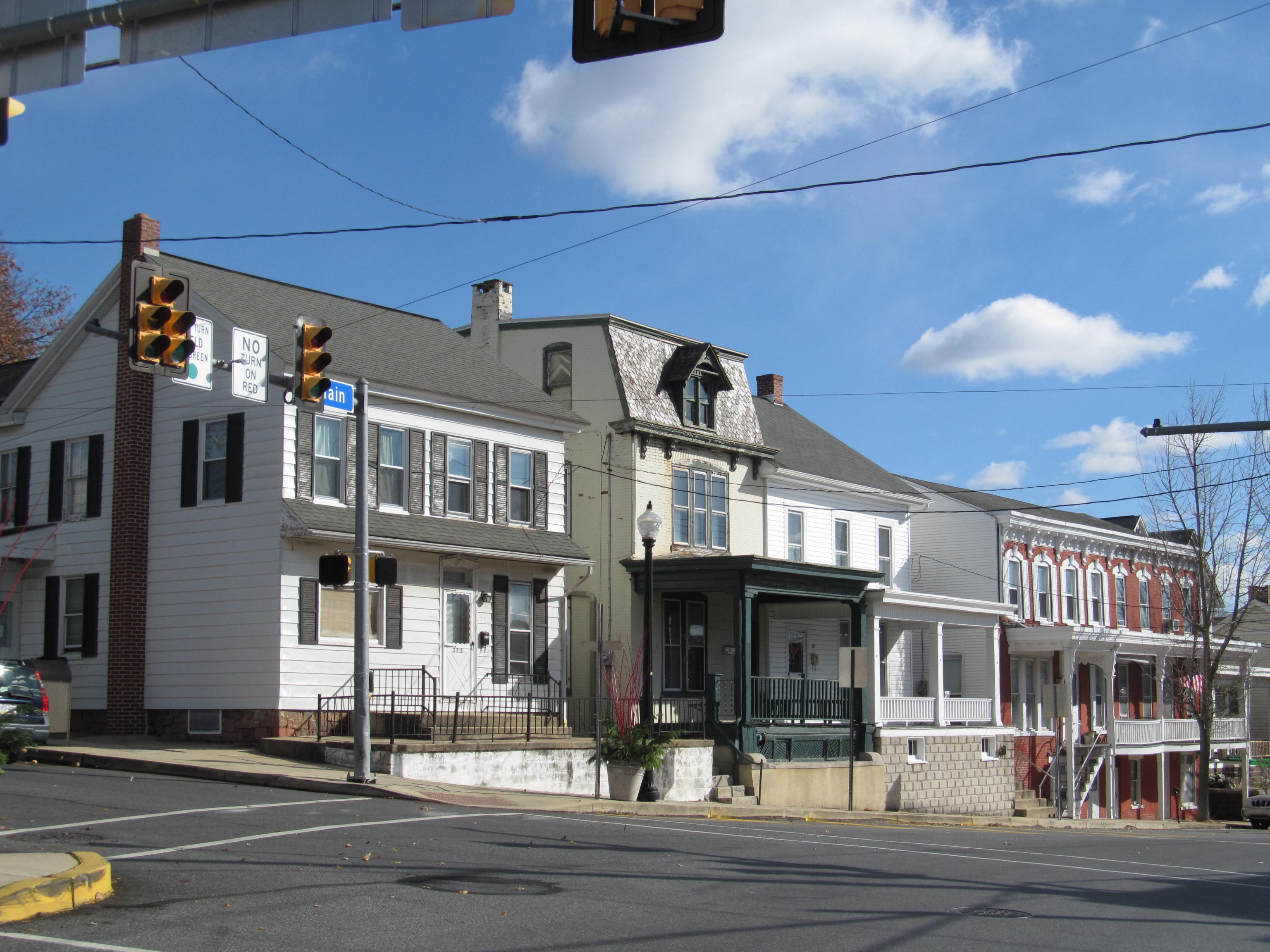
- Downtown Denver at the intersection of Main and 4th streets

- Location of Denver in Lancaster County, Pennsylvania

- Location in Pennsylvania Location in the United States
- Coordinates: 40°14′02″N 76°08′14″W
- Country: United States
- State: Pennsylvania
- County: Lancaster

Government
  - Mayor: Rodney L Redcay

Area
  - Total: 1.30 sq mi (3.36 km^{2})
  - Land: 1.28 sq mi (3.31 km^{2})
  - Water: 0.019 sq mi (0.05 km^{2})
- Elevation: 394 ft (120 m)

Population (2020)
  - Total: 3,792
  - Density: 2,964.2/sq mi (1,144.48/km^{2})
- Time zone: UTC-5 (EST)
  - Summer (DST): UTC-4 (EDT)
- ZIP Code: 17517
- Area codes: 717 and 223
- FIPS code: 42-18888
- Website: denverboro.net

Denver (Pennsylvania German: Bucherdaal, lit. 'Bucher Valley') is a borough in Lancaster County, Pennsylvania, United States. The population was 3,794 at the 2020 census, a decline from the figure of 3,861 tabulated in 2010.

== History ==
=== 18th century ===
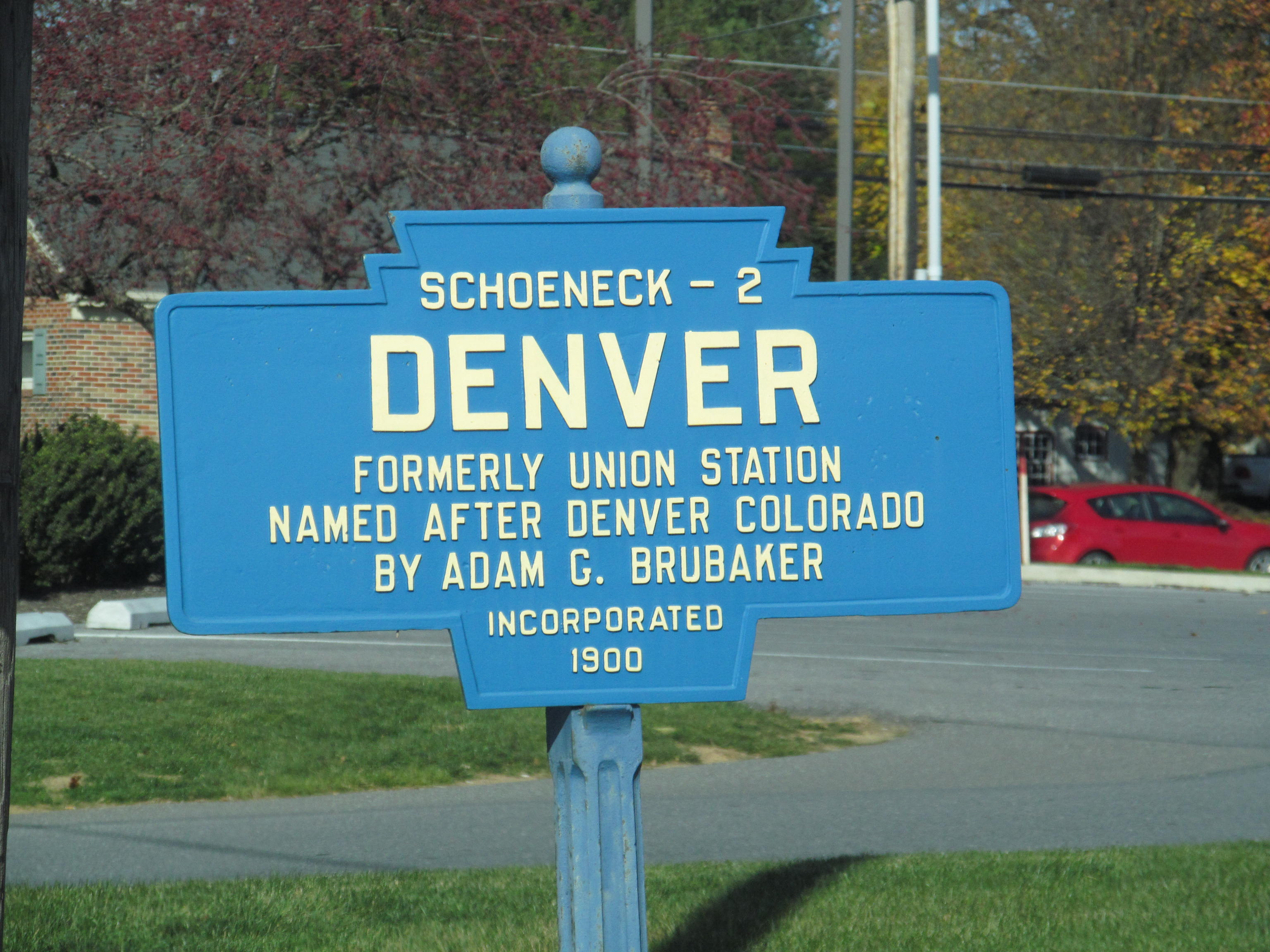
Denver's Keystone Marker

Denver was founded by in 1735, by Hans Bucher, a Swiss immigrant. It was originally known as Bucher's Thal, or "Bucher Valley", in reference to the adjacent Cocalico Creek. The original name is the source of the Pennsylvania German name, Bucherdaal.

In the mid-18th century, a gristmill was built along the creek, and by 1772 six dwellings had been built. A blacksmith shop and a sawmill were operating by 1820. Early advantages for the settlement were fertile soils and the limestone formations that were mined for the manufacture of mortar, plaster and whitewash.

=== 19th century ===
In the 1830s, settler John Bucher became an advocate for using the lime as a fertilizer. Several limestone quarries were in turn operating by the 1850s.

During the Civil War, the Reading and Columbia Railroad built a line through town, prompting a name change to "Union Station". With time, residents grew weary being referred to as a train station. After researching post offices in the country, Adam Brubaker found only one named Denver. On November 1, 1881, the town was officially renamed Denver.

By the late 19th century, continued growth had some residents considering incorporating as a borough. The tipping point was a major fire at the Denver House, a tavern built behind the train station in 1868. Water from a local well and the nearby Cocalico Creek was insufficient to fight the fire, prompting tobacco merchant Aaron Shirk, physician W.D. Fink and businessman Ephraim Renninger to press for incorporation, so a municipal water system could be created. The trio filed an application for incorporation in April 1900, and by that December, Denver Borough had come into being. It originally encompassed 183 acres (74 ha), about a quarter its current size.

=== 20th century ===
With the turn of the century, the new borough purchased a reservoir site and constructed a water plant, which went online in 1902. The one quarry still in operation today just outside Denver was opened in 1906 by Abram G. Kurtz. Around the time Denver was incorporated, cigar making was the dominant industry in the area, but mechanization eventually doomed the trade in hand-rolling cigars. New industries sprouted up, including the F&M Hat Company, founded in 1912 by brothers Samuel and Daniel Fichthorn along with their brother-in-law Ambrose Marburger. F&M Hat quickly grew into the town's largest employer, giving generations of residents jobs in its factory. By 1939 there were 835 employees working two shifts.

In 1977, the Cocalico Eagles boys' basketball team, under the direction of coach Ed McIlmoyle, defeated Mercer, 75–59, in the PIAA Class AA state championship game.

Bucher's Mill Covered Bridge, south of Denver near Reamstown, was listed on the National Register of Historic Places in 1980.

=== 21st century ===
In 2003, the body of Jon Luna, an assistant United States attorney, was found in Denver.

== Geography ==
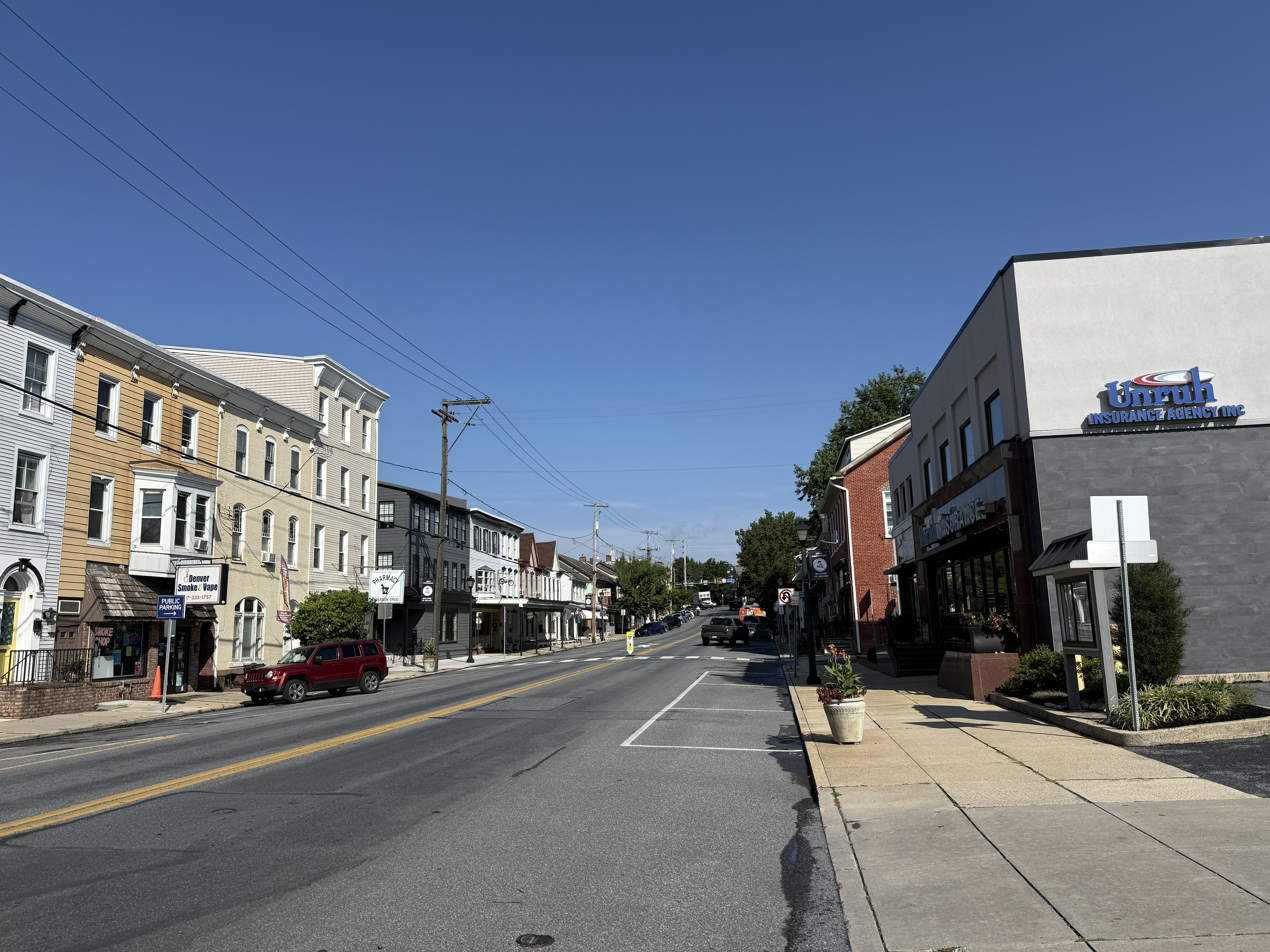
Main Street in Denver

Denver is located in northeastern Lancaster County at 40°14′2″N 76°8′14″W (40.233859, -76.137088). It is bordered to the southeast by Reamstown and to the southwest by Stevens. Interstate 76, the Pennsylvania Turnpike, passes through the northern side of the borough, with the closest access 3 miles (5 km) to the east at Exit 286 (U.S. Route 222). Denver is 17 miles (27 km) northeast of Lancaster and 15 miles (24 km) southwest of Reading.

According to the United States Census Bureau, the borough has a total area of 1.3 square miles (3.4 km^{2}), of which 0.02 square miles (0.05 km^{2}), or 1.45%, are water. Denver sits in a valley formed by Cocalico Creek to the west and Little Cocalico Creek to the east; the two creeks join at the southern border of the borough. Cocalico Creek is a tributary of the Conestoga River and part of the Susquehanna watershed.

== Demographics ==
Historical population
Census	Pop.	Note	%±
1910	933		—
1920	1,125		20.6%
1930	1,203		6.9%
1940	1,428		18.7%
1950	1,658		16.1%
1960	1,875		13.1%
1970	2,248		19.9%
1980	2,018		−10.2%
1990	2,861		41.8%
2000	3,332		16.5%
2010	3,861		15.9%
2020	3,792		−1.8%
2021 (est.)	3,770	▼	−0.6%

=== 2020 census ===
As of the 2020 census, Denver had a population of 3,792. The median age was 40.3 years. 23.3% of residents were under the age of 18 and 16.3% of residents were 65 years of age or older. For every 100 females there were 99.1 males, and for every 100 females age 18 and over there were 93.5 males age 18 and over.

100.0% of residents lived in urban areas, while 0.0% lived in rural areas.

There were 1,432 households in Denver, of which 34.2% had children under the age of 18 living in them. Of all households, 56.1% were married-couple households, 15.6% were households with a male householder and no spouse or partner present, and 21.4% were households with a female householder and no spouse or partner present. About 21.5% of all households were made up of individuals and 8.8% had someone living alone who was 65 years of age or older.

There were 1,486 housing units, of which 3.6% were vacant. The homeowner vacancy rate was 0.5% and the rental vacancy rate was 4.3%.

Racial composition as of the 2020 census
Race	Number	Percent
White	3,362	88.7%
Black or African American	48	1.3%
American Indian and Alaska Native	1	0.0%
Asian	88	2.3%
Native Hawaiian and Other Pacific Islander	1	0.0%
Some other race	70	1.8%
Two or more races	222	5.9%
Hispanic or Latino (of any race)	255	6.7%

=== 2010 census ===
As of the 2010 census, there were 15,391 people, 5,507 households, and 4,204 families living in the 17517 zip code. The population density was 11,839.2 people per square mile (4,571.1 people/km^{2}). There were 5,705 housing units at an average density of 4,388.5 per square mile (1,694.4/km^{2}). The racial makeup of the borough was 96.5% White, 1.2% Black or African American, 2.2% Asian, 0.03% Pacific Islander, 0.8% from other races, and 1.1% from two or more races. 2.28% of the population were Hispanic or Latino of any race.

There were 5,507 households, out of which 36.5% had children under the age of 18 living with them, 61.4% were married couples living together, 8.5% had a female householder with no husband present, and 25.4% were non-families. 21.1% of all households were made up of individuals, and 8.5% had someone living alone who was 65 years of age or older. The average household size was 2.63 and the average family size was 3.04.

In the borough the population was spread out, with 26.5% under the age of 18, 8.0% from 18 to 24, 24.1% from 25 to 44, 27.2% from 45 to 64, and 14.2% who were 65 years of age or older. The median age was 38.7 years. For every 100 females there were 98.2 males. For every 100 females age 18 and over, there were 98.1 males.

=== 2000 census ===
From the 2000 Census, the median income for a household in the borough was $49,085, and the median income for a family was $53,125. Males had a median income of $36,250 versus $23,715 for females. The per capita income for the borough was $19,706. About 4.5% of families and 5.2% of the population were below the poverty line, including 5.4% of those under age 18 and 3.3% of those age 65 or over.

== Education ==
Denver is served by the Cocalico School District.

== Notable people ==
- Jerry G. Beck Jr., US Army brigadier general
- Mark D. McCormack, US Army major general
