= Reamstown, Pennsylvania =

Unincorporated community in Pennsylvania, US

Reamstown, Pennsylvania Riemeschteddel (Pennsylvania German)
- Census-designated place
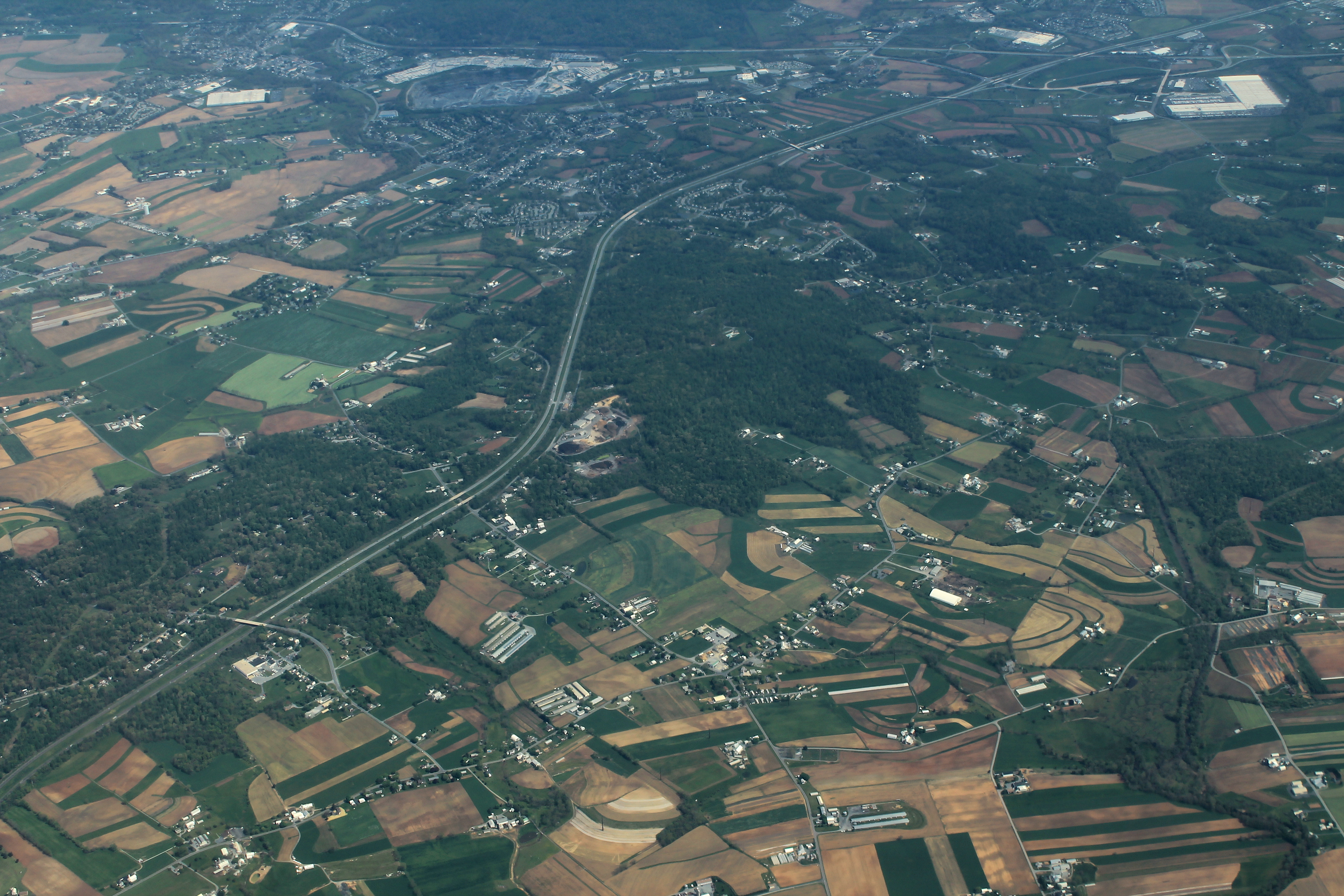
- Aerial view of Reamstown (top center)

- Lancaster County's location in Pennsylvania

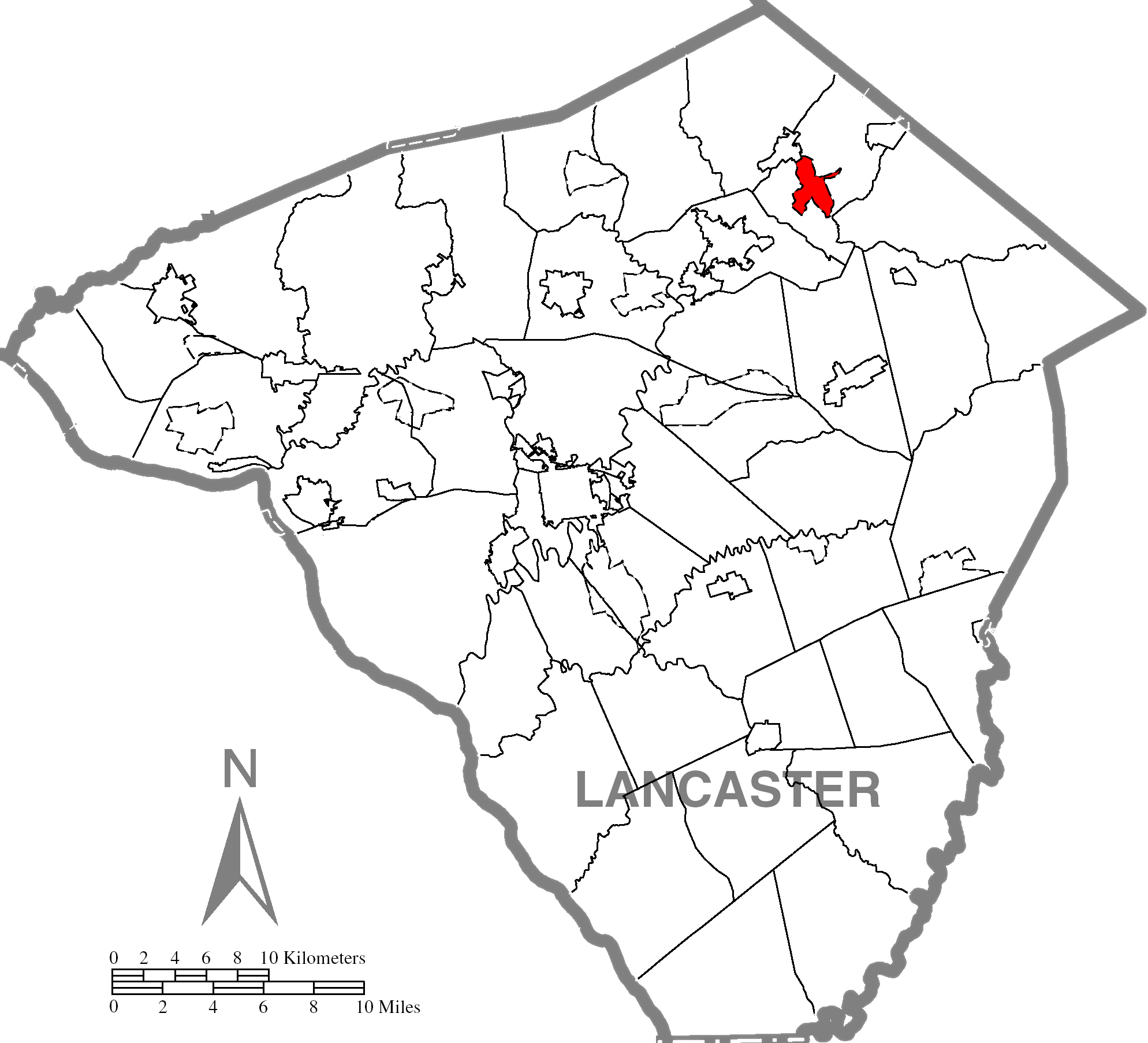
- Reamstown's location in Lancaster County
- Coordinates: 40°12′43″N 76°7′3″W
- Country: United States
- State: Pennsylvania
- County: Lancaster
- Township: East Cocalico

Area
  - Total: 2.27 sq mi (5.88 km^{2})
  - Land: 2.26 sq mi (5.85 km^{2})
  - Water: 0.015 sq mi (0.04 km^{2})
- Elevation: 392 ft (119 m)

Population (2020)
  - Total: 3,367
  - Density: 1,491.7/sq mi (575.96/km^{2})
- Time zone: UTC-5 (EST)
  - Summer (DST): UTC-4 (EDT)
- ZIP Code: 17567
- Area code: 717
- FIPS code: 42-63664
- GNIS feature ID: 1184739

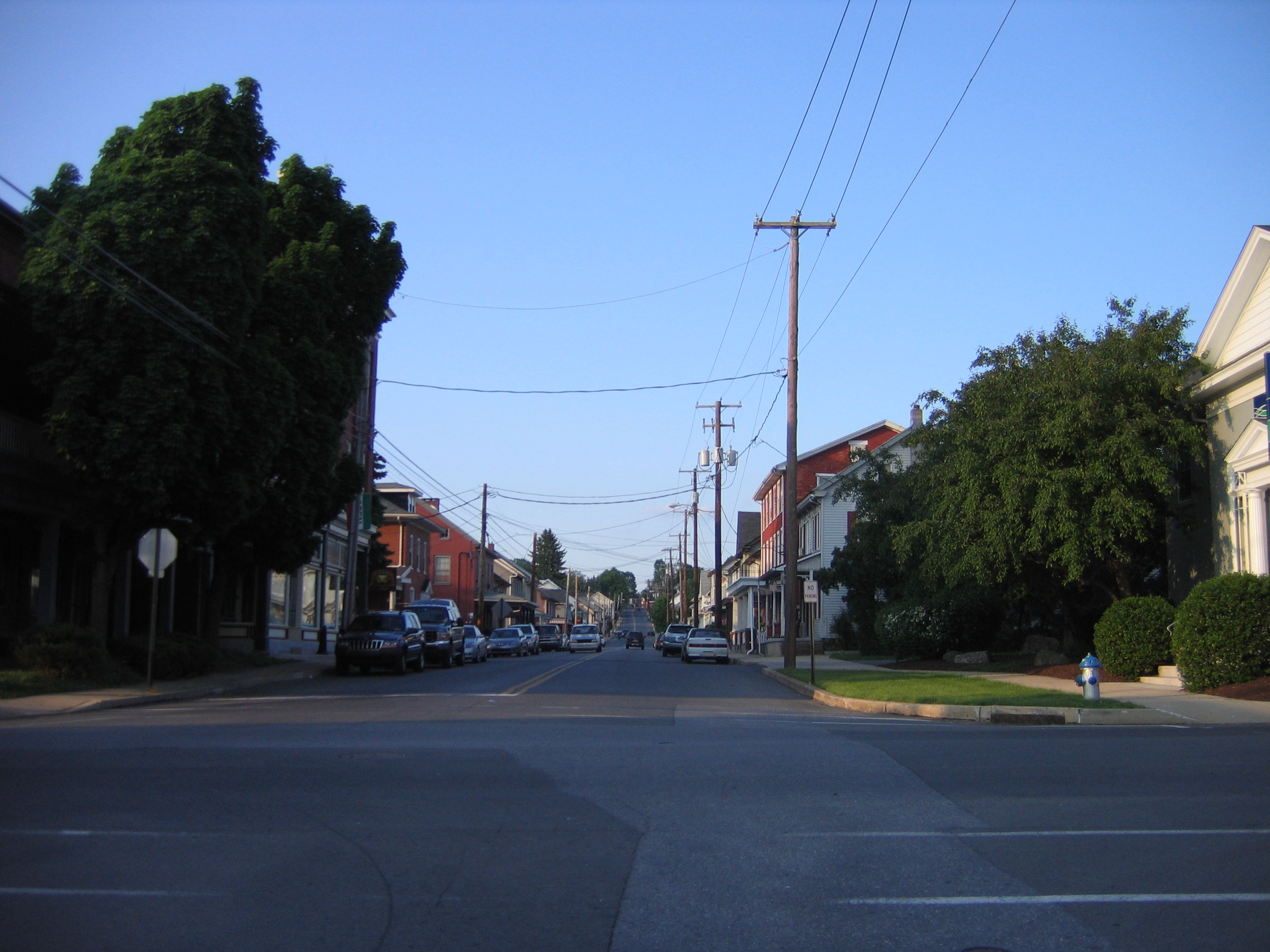
North Reamstown Road at Church Street

Reamstown (Pennsylvania German: Riemeschteddel) is an unincorporated community and census-designated place (CDP) in Lancaster County, Pennsylvania, United States. The population was 3,361 at the 2010 census.

== Geography ==
Reamstown is located in northeastern Lancaster County at 40°12′43″N 76°7′3″W (40.212046, -76.117587), in the southern part of East Cocalico Township. It is bordered to the northwest by the borough of Denver.

Pennsylvania Route 272 passes through the community north of the downtown section. PA 272 leads northeast 4 miles (6 km) to Adamstown and southwest the same distance to Ephrata. U.S. Route 222, a four-lane expressway, passes through the south side of the Reamstown CDP, but the closest access is 2 miles (3 km) to the northeast, from Colonel Howard Boulevard, which also provides access to the Pennsylvania Turnpike. Reading is 15 miles (24 km) northeast of Reamstown, Lancaster is 17 miles (27 km) to the southwest, and Philadelphia is 62 miles (100 km) to the southeast.

According to the United States Census Bureau, the CDP has a total area of 2.3 square miles (5.9 km^{2}), of 0.02 square miles (0.04 km^{2}), or 0.63%, are water. Cocalico Creek runs along the northwestern edge of the CDP, flowing southwest to the Conestoga River, which continues southwest to the Susquehanna.

== History ==
The town was named after Eberhard Ream (Johann Eberhardt Riehm 1687–1779), whose son, Tobias Ream, founded it in the 1740s. It was originally known as "Zohar."

During the American Revolution, Reamstown served as one of a number of field hospitals for the wounded following the Battle of Brandywine on September 11, 1777. A dozen or more of these troops died here and are buried in unmarked graves in the Salem Evangelical Cemetery. The cemetery is also home to a large boulder that once served as a mortar and pestle by the native people who lived on nearby Ephrata Mountain to the south. It was transported to Reamstown by Pierce Lesher, and today a plaque on the stone details both the Native American and military history.

== Demographics ==
Historical population
| Census | Pop. | Note | %± |
|---|---|---|---|
| 2020 | 3,367 | | — |
U.S. Decennial Census

=== 2020 census ===
As of the 2020 census, Reamstown had a population of 3,367. The median age was 42.0 years. 22.6% of residents were under the age of 18 and 18.1% of residents were 65 years of age or older. For every 100 females there were 103.4 males, and for every 100 females age 18 and over there were 101.5 males age 18 and over.

98.9% of residents lived in urban areas, while 1.1% lived in rural areas.

There were 1,306 households in Reamstown, of which 31.8% had children under the age of 18 living in them. Of all households, 62.2% were married-couple households, 15.2% were households with a male householder and no spouse or partner present, and 17.3% were households with a female householder and no spouse or partner present. About 24.0% of all households were made up of individuals and 13.1% had someone living alone who was 65 years of age or older.

There were 1,371 housing units, of which 4.7% were vacant. The homeowner vacancy rate was 1.7% and the rental vacancy rate was 6.6%.

Racial composition as of the 2020 census
| Race | Number | Percent |
|---|---|---|
| White | 3,158 | 93.8% |
| Black or African American | 21 | 0.6% |
| American Indian and Alaska Native | 1 | 0.0% |
| Asian | 48 | 1.4% |
| Native Hawaiian and Other Pacific Islander | 0 | 0.0% |
| Some other race | 37 | 1.1% |
| Two or more races | 102 | 3.0% |
| Hispanic or Latino (of any race) | 95 | 2.8% |

=== 2000 census ===
As of the census of 2000, there were 3,498 people, 1,161 households, and 897 families living in the CDP. The population density was 1,542.0 inhabitants per square mile (595.4/km^{2}). There were 1,194 housing units at an average density of 526.3 per square mile (203.2/km^{2}). The racial makeup of the CDP was 95.23% White, 0.31% African American, 0.26% Native American, 2.23% Asian, 0.03% Pacific Islander, 0.80% from other races, and 1.14% from two or more races. Hispanic or Latino of any race were 1.92% of the population.

There were 1,161 households, out of which 41.6% had children under the age of 18 living with them, 67.9% were married couples living together, 6.1% had a female householder with no husband present, and 22.7% were non-families. 18.1% of all households were made up of individuals, and 6.5% had someone living alone who was 65 years of age or older. The average household size was 2.85 and the average family size was 3.25.

In the CDP, the population was spread out, with 28.6% under the age of 18, 6.0% from 18 to 24, 33.3% from 25 to 44, 19.8% from 45 to 64, and 12.3% who were 65 years of age or older. The median age was 36 years. For every 100 females, there were 99.7 males. For every 100 females age 18 and over, there were 97.6 males.

The median income for a household in the CDP was $53,423, and the median income for a family was $58,625. Males had a median income of $40,516 versus $25,625 for females. The per capita income for the CDP was $21,143. About 3.3% of families and 5.5% of the population were below the poverty line, including 9.1% of those under age 18 and 4.8% of those age 65 or over.

== Notable person ==
- George S. Howard, founding commander and conductor of the United States Air Force band in 1947
