= West Cocalico Township, Pennsylvania =

Township in Pennsylvania, US

Coordinates: 40°17′00″N 76°06′59″W

- Township
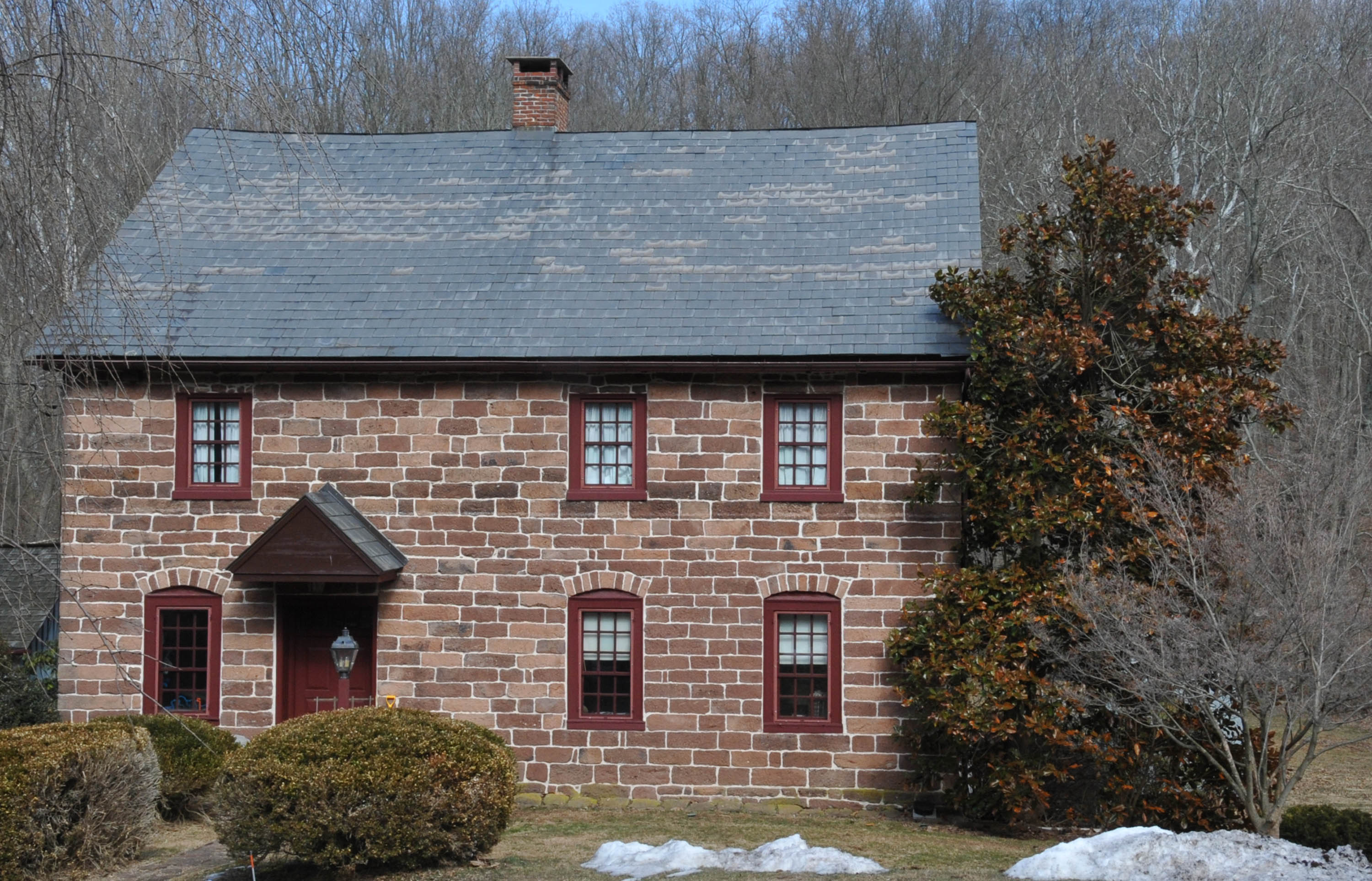
- Henry Walter House in West Cocalico Township

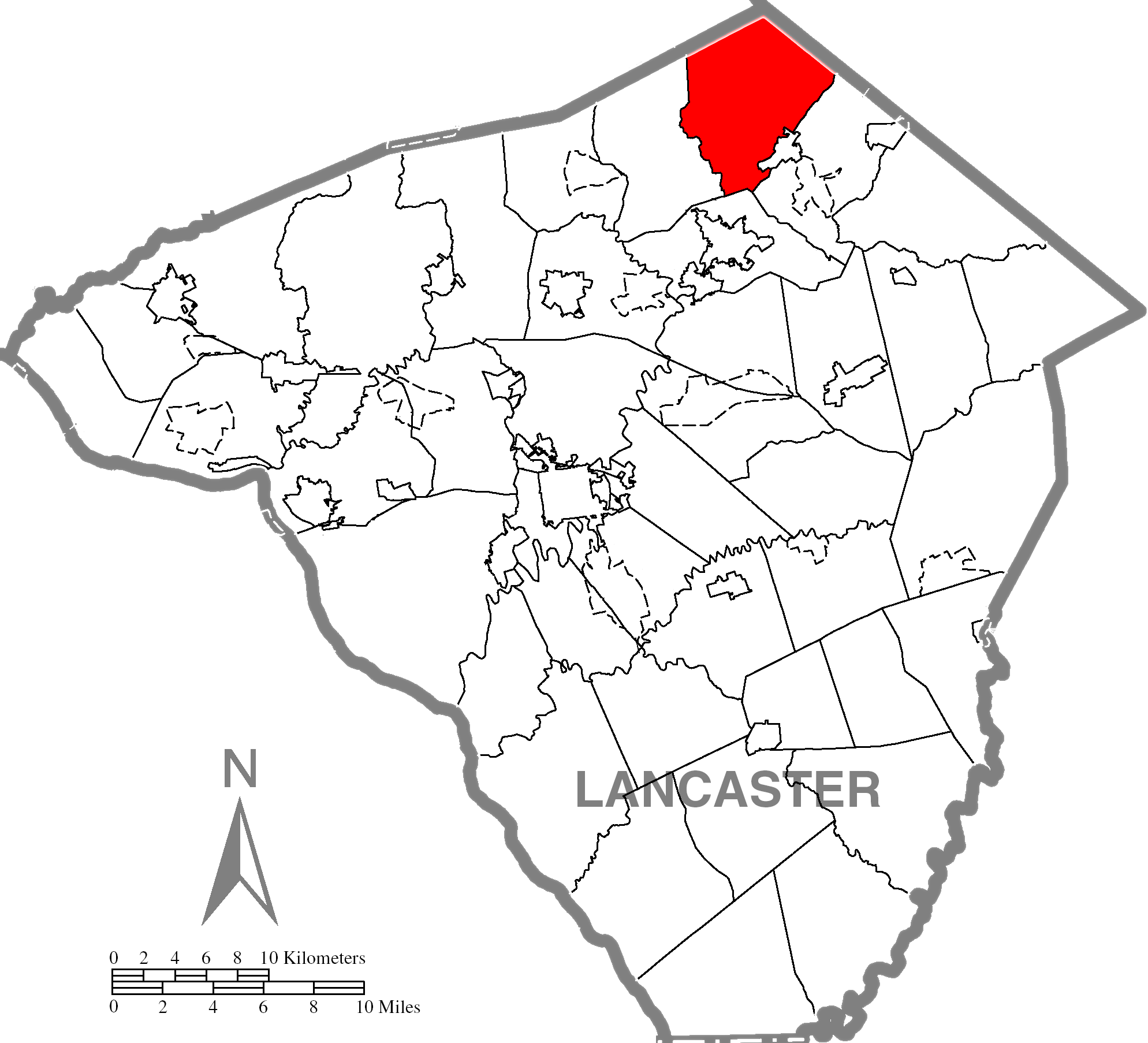
- Location of West Cocalico Township in Lancaster County, Pennsylvania

- Map of Lancaster County, Pennsylvania
- Country: United States
- State: Pennsylvania
- County: Lancaster
- Settled: 1732
- Incorporated: 1838

Government
  - Type: Board of Supervisors

Area
  - Total: 27.61 sq mi (71.50 km^{2})
  - Land: 27.32 sq mi (70.75 km^{2})
  - Water: 0.29 sq mi (0.76 km^{2})

Population (2020)
  - Total: 7,491 ▲
  - Estimate (2021): 7,630
  - Density: 271.3/sq mi (104.74/km^{2})
- Time zone: UTC-5 (Eastern (EST))
  - Summer (DST): UTC-4 (EDT)
- FIPS code: 42-071-82728
- Website: westcocalicotownship.com

West Cocalico Township is a township that is located in northeastern Lancaster County, Pennsylvania, United States. The population was 7,491 at the time of the 2020 census.

== History ==
Cocalico Township was divided into East Cocalico and West Cocalico Townships in 1838. Among the township's historical sites listed on the National Register of Historic Places are Reinholds Station Trinity Chapel, Furnace Hills Tenant House, and Henry Walter House.

== Geography ==
West Cocalico is the northernmost township in Lancaster County. According to the United States Census Bureau, the township has a total area of 27.6 square miles (71.6 km^{2}), of which 27.6 square miles (71.4 km^{2}) are land and 0.04 square miles (0.1 km^{2}), or 0.18%, are water.

Unincorporated communities in the township include Cocalico, Union House, Blainsport, Reinholds, Schoeneck, and part of Stevens.

== Demographics ==
Historical population
Census	Pop.	Note	%±
2000	6,967		—
2010	7,280		4.5%
2020	7,491		2.9%
2021 (est.)	7,630		1.9%
U.S. Decennial Census

As of the census of 2000, there were 6,967 people, 2,298 households, and 1,888 families living in the township.

The population density was 252.6 inhabitants per square mile (97.5/km^{2}). There were 2,383 housing units at an average density of 86.4 units per square mile (33.4 units/km^{2}).

The racial makeup of the township was 98.31% White, 0.32% African American, 0.09% Native American, 0.39% Asian, 0.42% from other races, and 0.49% from two or more races. Hispanic or Latino of any race were 1.08% of the population.

There were 2,298 households, out of which 42.1% had children who were under the age of eighteen living with them; 73.7% were married couples living together, 5.6% had a female householder with no husband present, and 17.8% were non-families. Out of all of the households that were documented, 14.8% were made up of individuals, and 5.7% had someone living alone who was ixty-five years of age or older.

The average household size was 2.99 and the average family size was 3.33.

Within the township, the population was spread out, with 31.3% of residents who were under the age of 18, 6.7% from 18 to 24, 31.0% from 25 to 44, 21.0% from 45 to 64, and 10.1% who were 65 years of age or older. The median age was 34 years.

For every one hundred females, there were 98.4 males. For every one hundred females who were aged eighteen or older, there were 97.9 males.

The median income for a household in the township was $53,045, and the median income for a family was $57,152. Males had a median income of $40,077 compared with that of $24,184 for females.

The per capita income for the township was $20,306.

Approximately 1.2% of families and 2.6% of the population were living below the poverty line, including 1.8% of those who were under the age of eighteen and 4.6% of those who were aged sixty-five or older.
