= East Cocalico Township, Pennsylvania =

Township in Pennsylvania, US

Coordinates: 40°12′36″N 76°07′59″W

- Township
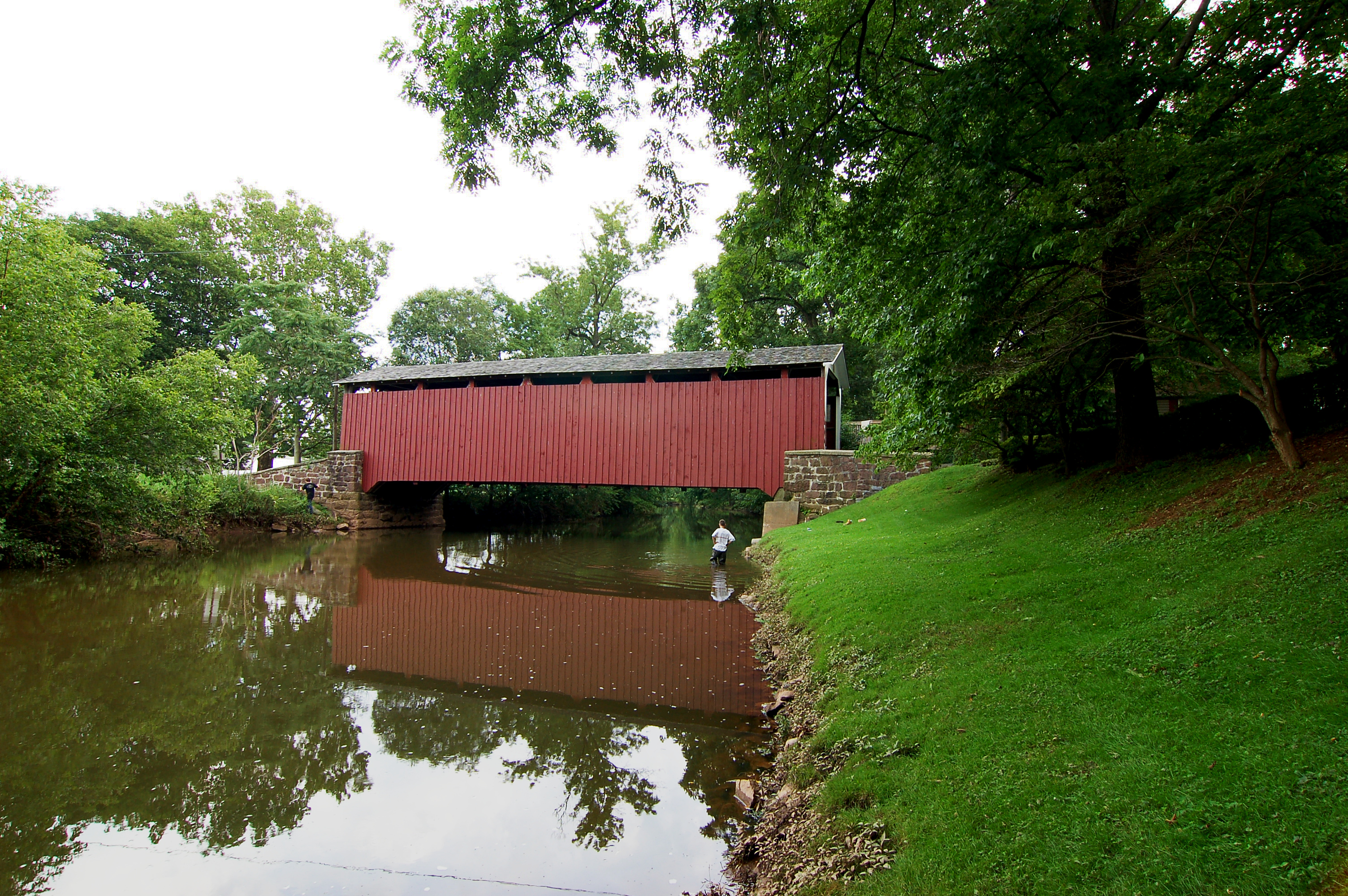
- Bucher's Mill Covered Bridge in East Cocalico Township

- Seal Logo

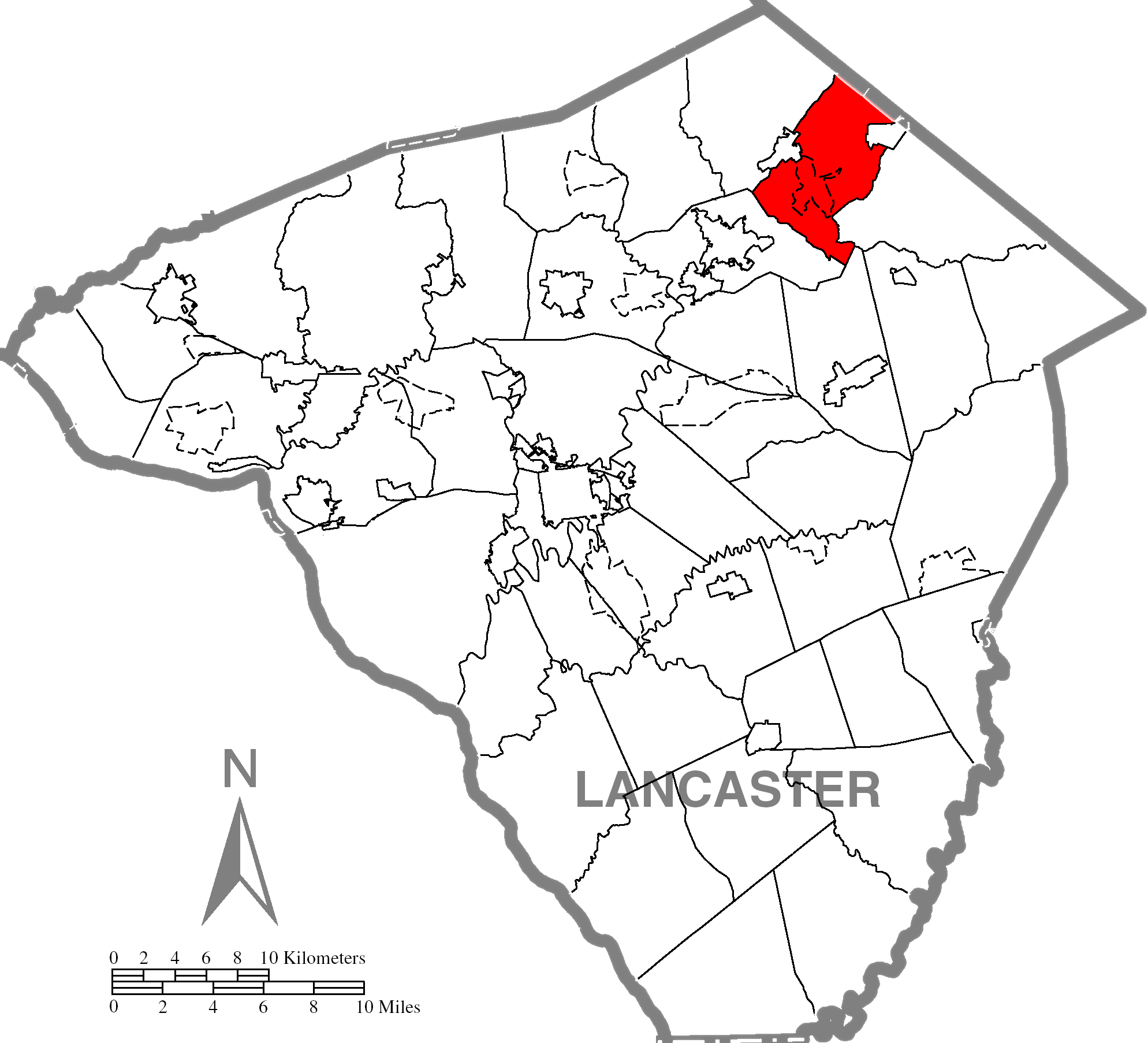
- Map of Lancaster County, Pennsylvania highlighting East Cocalico Township

- Map of Lancaster County, Pennsylvania
- Country: United States
- State: Pennsylvania
- County: Lancaster
- Settled: 1732
- Incorporated: 1838

Government
  - Type: Board of Supervisors
  - Chairman: Lorenzo Bonura
  - Vice Chairman: Jeffrey Mitchell

Area
  - Total: 20.59 sq mi (53.33 km^{2})
  - Land: 20.42 sq mi (52.90 km^{2})
  - Water: 0.16 sq mi (0.42 km^{2})

Population (2020)
  - Total: 10,808 ▲
  - Estimate (2021): 10,920
  - Density: 513.8/sq mi (198.38/km^{2})
- Time zone: UTC-5 (Eastern (EST))
  - Summer (DST): UTC-4 (EDT)
- Area code: 717
- FIPS code: 42-071-20984
- Website: www.ect.town

East Cocalico Township is a second class township in northeastern Lancaster County, Pennsylvania, United States. At the 2020 census, the population was 10,808.

== History ==
East Cocalico Township is located in the northeastern part of Lancaster County, Pennsylvania. It was established on May 8, 1838, when the original Cocalico Township was divided into East Cocalico, West Cocalico, and Ephrata Townships. Irregular in shape, East Cocalico extends approximately 5.5 miles in length and averages 3.5 miles in width.

The township is named after Cocalico Creek, a prominent waterway in the region, and a Native American village that existed in the area at the time of early European settlement. The name "Cocalico" is believed to derive from the Delaware (Lenape) phrase koch hale kung, meaning "den of serpents," likely referring to the abundance of snakes found near the creek.

The area was first settled by Europeans in the early 1720s, when Johann Eberhard Ream (or Riehm) moved his family from Leimen, Germany, to the area now known as Reamstown. Ream reportedly arrived in Pennsylvania in 1717 and settled near a spring behind what is now 31 South Reamstown Road. In 1736, he received a land patent for 389 acres from the heirs of William Penn.

By 1759, Eberhard and his wife Anna Schwab Ream divided the land among their sons. One son, Tobias Ream, received 54 acres, which he subdivided into building lots and sold using the ground rent system. Tobias originally named the community Zoar (sometimes spelled Zohar), but by 1772, the settlement was renamed Reamstown in the family’s honor.

During the mid-18th century, Reamstown became a hub of activity due to its strategic location on the road from Lancaster to Reading, then known as the King's Highway. A stagecoach route passed through the town, and several inns and hotels prospered from the travel and trade it brought. Another major early road—linking Churchtown and Schaefferstown—crossed the King's Highway in Reamstown, making the town a logical location for the seat of local governance for the then-larger Cocalico Township.

At that time, the original Cocalico Township encompassed not only the present-day East and West Cocalico Townships, but also the areas that now form the boroughs of Adamstown, Akron, Denver, and Ephrata, as well as part of Clay Township.

The township's physical geography—featuring fertile limestone soil, abundant water, and nearby foothills—supported early agricultural development. Farming became the dominant economic activity, and many of these farms have remained in operation to the present day, with preservation efforts coordinated in partnership with Lancaster County.

Small villages grew at transportation crossroads throughout the township, and with them came the development of country stores, churches, and schools. This early settlement pattern has left a lasting imprint on the landscape of East Cocalico Township.

== Geography ==
According to the U.S. Census Bureau, the township has a total area of 20.6 square miles (53 km^{2}), all land. It contains the communities of Swartzville and Reamstown, and part of Stevens and Frysville.

== Demographics ==
Historical population
Census	Pop.	Note	%±
1900	2,921		—
1910	2,259		−22.7%
1920	2,293		1.5%
1930	2,411		5.1%
1940	2,635		9.3%
1950	3,011		14.3%
1960	2,824		−6.2%
1970	3,557		26.0%
1980	6,354		78.6%
1990	7,809		22.9%
2000	9,954		27.5%
2010	10,310		3.6%
2020	10,808		4.8%
2021 (est.)	10,920		1.0%
U.S. Decennial Census

As of the census of 2020, there were 10,808 people, 3,936 households, and approximately 3,000 families living in the township. The population density was about 524.9 inhabitants per square mile (202.7/km^{2}). There were 4,084 housing units at an average density of approximately 198.3 per square mile (76.5/km^{2}). The racial makeup of the township was 93.56% White, 1.48% Black or African American, 0.07% Native American, 1.20% Asian, 0.01% Pacific Islander, 0.69% from other races, and 3.07% from two or more races. Hispanic or Latino of any race were 1.90% of the population.

There were 3,936 households, of which approximately 35% had children under the age of 18 living with them, 65% were married couples living together, 6% had a female householder with no husband present, and around 25% were non-families. About 22% of all households were made up of individuals, and 8% had someone living alone who was 65 years of age or older. The average household size was 2.76 and the average family size was approximately 3.20.

In the township, the population was spread out, with 23.4% under the age of 18, 6.8% from 18 to 24, 23.0% from 25 to 44, 28.3% from 45 to 64, and 18.5% who were 65 years of age or older. The median age was 40.8 years. For every 100 females, there were approximately 105 males. For every 100 females age 18 and over, there were about 103 males.

The median income for a household in the township was $89,697, and the median income for a family was $99,669. Males had a median income of approximately $55,000 versus $40,000 for females. The per capita income for the township was about $41,097. About 3.5% of families and 5.2% of the population were below the poverty line, including 7.4% of those under age 18 and 4.1% of those age 65 or over.

== Recreation ==
A small portion of the Pennsylvania State Game Lands Number 274 is located along the eastern border of the township. East Cocalico Recreational Park is located on East Church Street off U.S. Route 222.
