= Pennsylvania Route 772 =

State highway in Lancaster County, Pennsylvania, US

Pennsylvania Route 772

Route information
- Maintained by PennDOT
- Length: 38.495 mi (61.952 km)

Major junctions
- West end: PA 441 near Marietta
- PA 230 in Mount Joy; PA 283 near Mount Joy; PA 72 in Manheim; PA 501 in Lititz; PA 272 in West Earl Township; US 222 in West Earl Township; PA 23 near New Holland; PA 340 in Intercourse
- East end: US 30 near Gap

Location
- Country: United States
- State: Pennsylvania
- Counties: Lancaster

Highway system
- Pennsylvania State Route System; Interstate; US; State; Scenic; Legislative
← PA 770	→ PA 780
← US 140	PA 141	→ PA 142

Pennsylvania Route 772 (PA 772) is an east–west 38.5-mile-long (62.0 km) state highway located in Lancaster County, Pennsylvania. The western terminus of PA 772 is at PA 441 in Marietta, and its eastern terminus is at U.S. Route 30 (US 30) just west of Gap. The route is mostly a two-lane road that passes through rural areas of the Pennsylvania Dutch Country to the north of the city of Lancaster. The highway goes through the boroughs of Mount Joy, Manheim, and Lititz, along with the villages of Rothsville, Leola, and Intercourse.

The eastern portion of PA 772 follows the Newport Road, a colonial road connecting Mount Hope, Pennsylvania and Newport, Delaware. PA 772 was first designated by 1930 to run from PA 672 (Fruitville Pike) southeast of Manheim east to US 222 and PA 722 in Brownstown. PA 141 was designated in 1928 to run from PA 441 in Marietta north to US 230 (now PA 230) in Mount Joy. PA 772 was extended south from Brownstown to PA 340 east of Lancaster in the 1930s, replacing a former section of US 222 that was realigned. The route followed its current alignment to Leacock where it headed southwest along Horseshoe Road. The route was extended west to PA 72 in Manheim in the 1940s, replacing the northernmost section of PA 672. Between the 1950 and 1960s, PA 772 followed a different alignment further to the north between Lititz and Rothsville. In the 1960s, PA 772 was rerouted to head to its current eastern terminus in Gap. The route was extended west from Manheim to Marietta in the 1980s, replacing the entire length of PA 141. In the 2000s, a study was undertaken to move PA 772 to a different alignment further to the north between Manheim and Lititz; no action has been taken.

== Route description ==
=== Marietta to Lititz ===
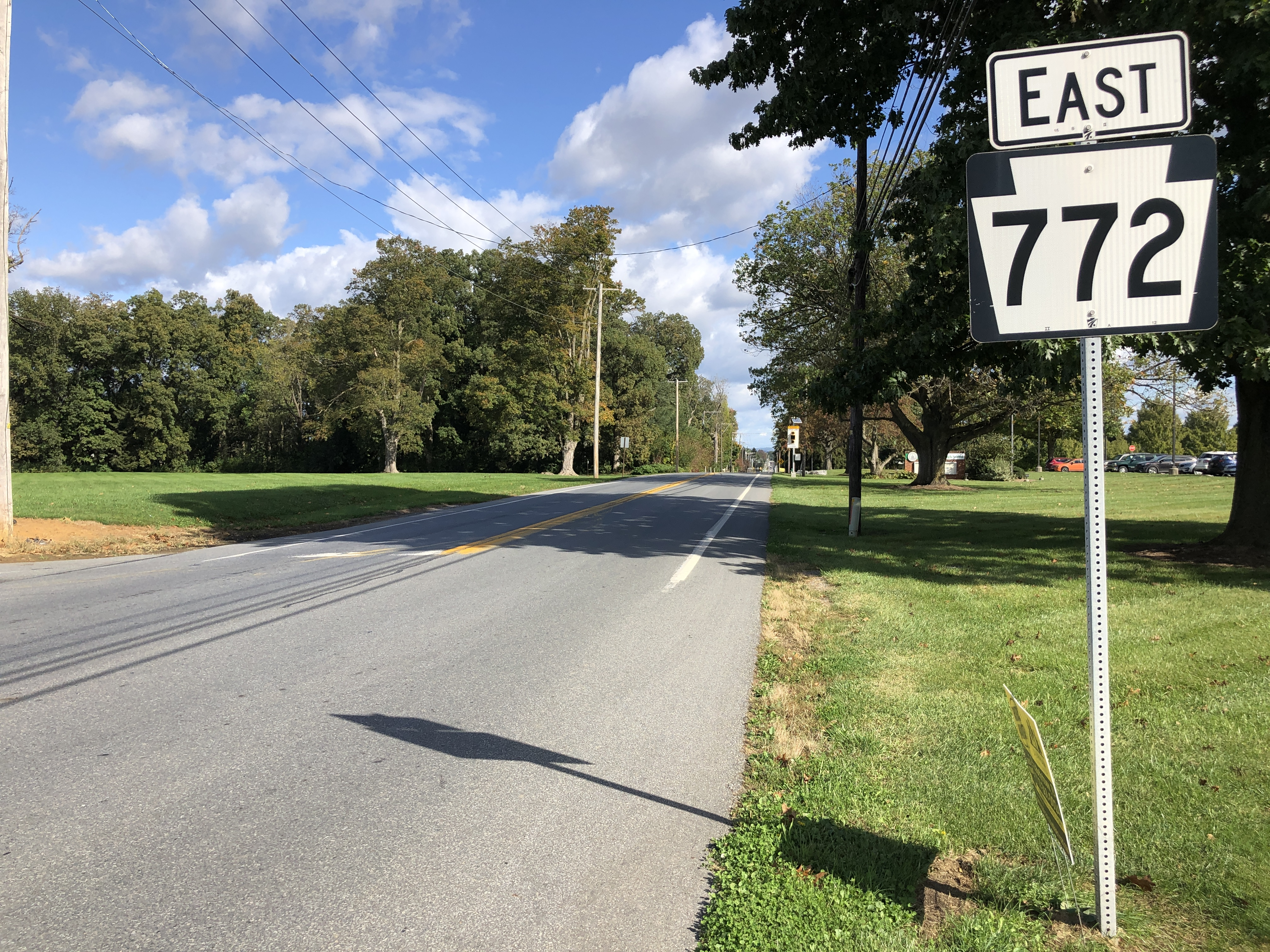
PA 772 eastbound in East Donegal Township

PA 772 begins at an intersection with PA 441 north of the borough of Marietta in East Donegal Township, Lancaster County, where Waterford Avenue continues south into Marietta. From here, the route heads northeast on two-lane undivided Anderson Ferry Road, passing through agricultural areas with some trees and homes. The road crosses Donegal Creek and continues through rural land before it heads into residential areas and passes to the east of Donegal Heights and to the west of Donegal High School. PA 772 heads into the borough of Mount Joy and becomes Marietta Avenue, running past multiple homes and turning to the east-northeast. The route passes over Amtrak's Keystone Corridor railroad line east of Mount Joy station before it comes to an intersection with PA 230. At this point, PA 772 turns west to form a concurrency with PA 230 on East Main Street, passing through the residential and commercial downtown. The road becomes West Main Street upon crossing Market Street. PA 772 splits from PA 230 by heading northeast on Manheim Street, passing homes before crossing a Norfolk Southern railroad spur at-grade in an industrial area. The road continues through residential areas and forms the border between Mount Joy Township to the northwest and Mount Joy to the southeast before it crosses Little Chiques Creek into Rapho Township. At this point, the route becomes Mt. Joy Road and passes through farmland with some residential and commercial development, briefly gaining a center left-turn lane between the Elmcrest Boulevard and Strickler Road intersections. PA 772 heads east and comes to a diamond interchange with the PA 283 freeway. The road continues northeast through agricultural areas with occasional development, coming to the residential community of Sporting Hill. The route continues into a mix of fields and woods with some homes, curving to the north.

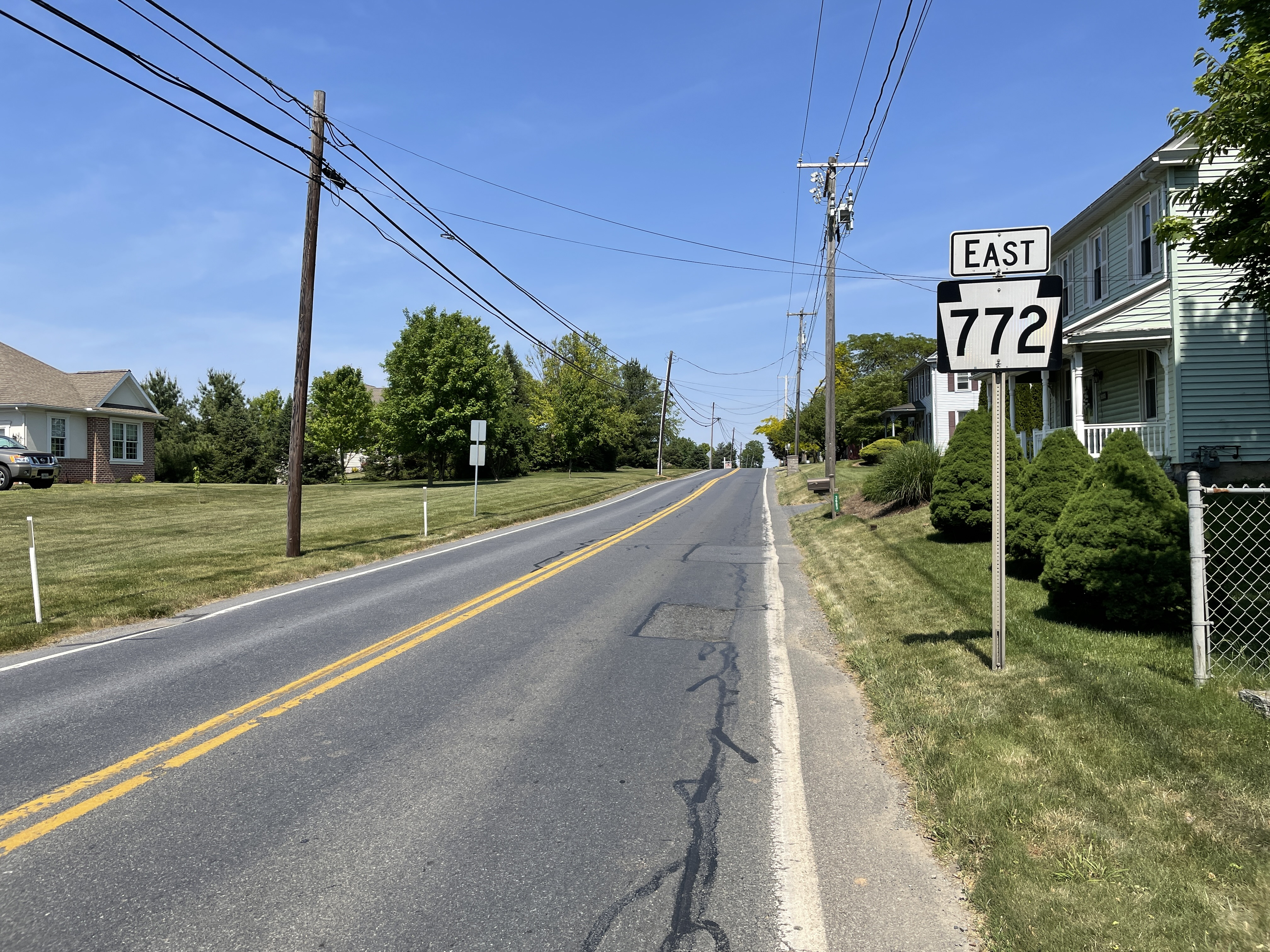
PA 772 eastbound in Rapho Township

PA 772 enters the borough of Manheim, where it becomes West High Street and runs through residential areas. The route heads into the commercial downtown and becomes Market Square, a divided highway with a town square and parking spaces in the median. In the center of Manheim, PA 772 intersects PA 72 and turns southeast for a concurrency with that route on two-lane undivided South Main Street, passing more downtown businesses before becoming lined with homes. The road crosses Norfolk Southern's Lititz Secondary railroad line at-grade and enters commercial areas, where PA 772 splits from PA 72 by heading east on Fruitville Pike. The route crosses Chiques Creek and heads into Penn Township, where it heads southeast through farmland with some trees and homes. PA 772 splits from Fruitville Pike by turning northeast onto Temperance Hill Road, heading through agricultural areas and bending southeast. The road continues through rural areas and curves east to enter Warwick Township. At this point, the route becomes West Orange Street and runs between farmland to the north and residential neighborhoods to the south. PA 772 continues into the borough of Lititz and passes south of Warwick High School, running past more homes. In the center of town, the route intersects PA 501 and turns north for a concurrency with that route on South Broad Street, passing downtown homes and businesses. PA 772 splits from PA 501 by heading east along East Main Street, where a small town square is located in the middle of the road. The route continues as a two-lane undivided road past more of the downtown before it heads into residential areas, passing north of the Linden Hall boarding school.

=== Lititz to Gap ===
PA 772 leaves Lititz for Warwick Township again and heads southeast past a mix of homes and businesses, becoming Rothsville Road. The route reaches a roundabout with Clay Road/East 6th Street. The road winds east through woods parallel to Lititz Run before it turns northeast and crosses the stream and passes through a mix of fields and woods. The route heads east and runs through the community of Rothsville, where it passes homes along with a couple businesses. In Rothsville, PA 772 continues onto Newport Road and heads through more developed areas. The road turns southeast and runs through a mix of farms, woods, and residences. The route turns south and crosses Cocalico Creek into West Earl Township, where it heads through farmland and passes to the west of a couple warehouses. PA 772 continues into business areas and gains a center left-turn lane before it comes to an intersection with PA 272. Past this intersection, the road becomes a four-lane divided highway and reaches a partial cloverleaf interchange with the US 222 freeway. At this point, the route enters the Pennsylvania Dutch Country of eastern Lancaster County, which is home to many Amish farms. The route heads south as a two-lane undivided road and runs through the community of Brownstown, where it passes homes and a few businesses along State Street. PA 772 crosses the Conestoga River and runs through the residential community of Talmage, where it curves southeast. The road heads into agricultural areas with occasional homes, with the name changing to Glenbrook Road. The route turns south and passes through the community of Center Square, at which point it enters Upper Leacock Township. The road continues through rural land before heading into the community of Leacock, where it passes homes and a few businesses before coming to PA 23.

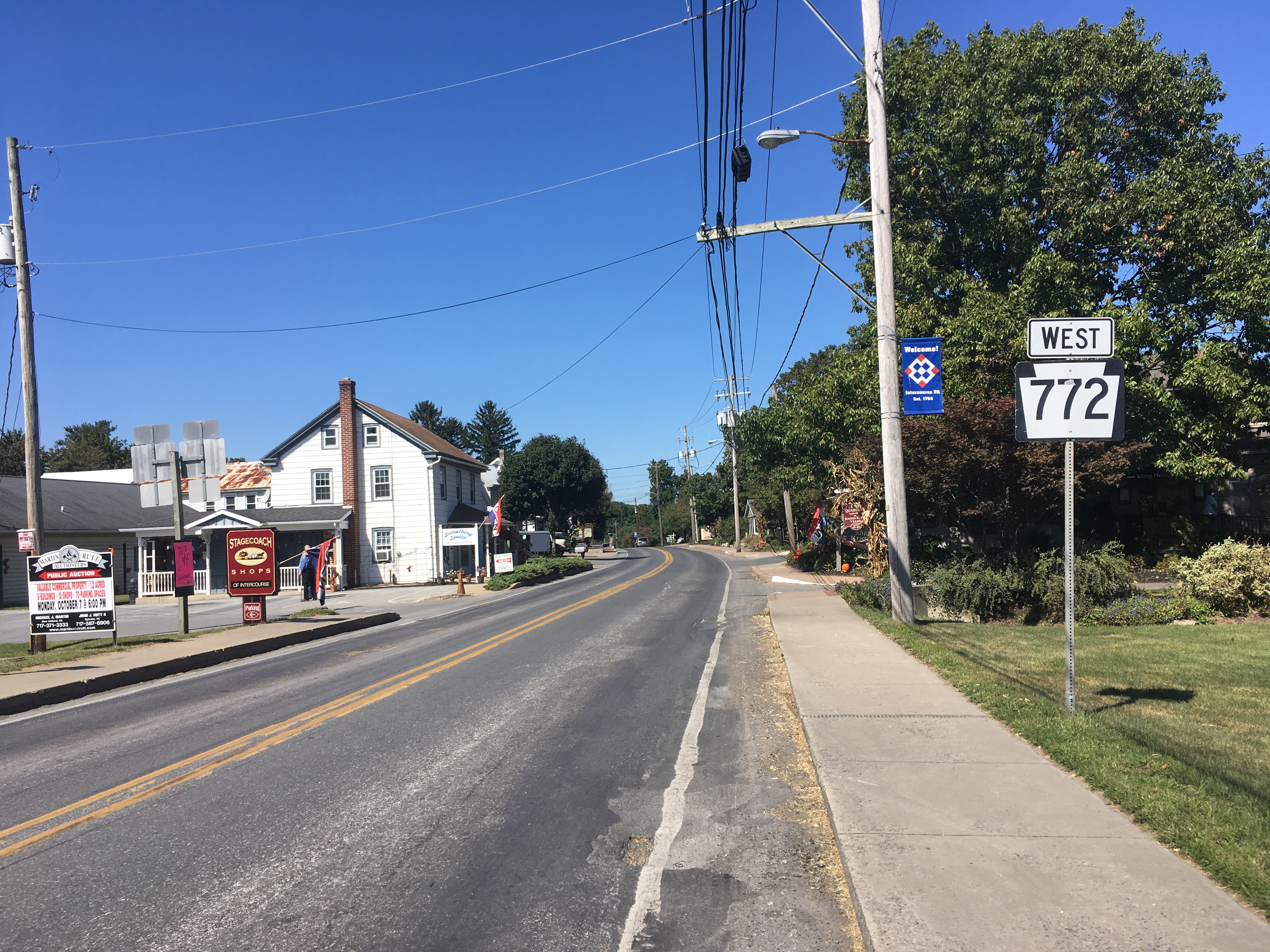
PA 772 westbound past PA 340 in Intercourse

At this point, PA 772 turns east for a concurrency with PA 23 on West Main Street, lined with homes. PA 772 splits from PA 23 in Leola by heading southeast along Newport Road, turning south and passing through a mix of industrial areas and homes. The road crosses Norfolk Southern's New Holland Secondary at-grade and continues through a mix of farmland and industrial and commercial development, bending southeast. The route widens to a four-lane divided highway and comes to an incomplete interchange with the unbuilt Goat Path Expressway, with a bridge over the right-of-way. PA 772 narrows back to a two-lane undivided road and passes through the residential community of Monterey and continues through agricultural areas, crossing Mill Creek into Leacock Township near the community of Mascot. The road runs through farmland and makes several turns to the east and south. The route heads southeast and enters the community of Intercourse, where it passes residences and turns south to an intersection with PA 340. Here, PA 772 turns east to join PA 340 on Main Street, a three-lane road with a center left-turn lane that passes homes and businesses. PA 772 splits from PA 340 at a Y-intersection by continuing southeast along Newport Road, passing through residential areas. The road leaves Intercourse and runs through agricultural land with scattered residences, heading southwest of Pequea Valley High School. The route crosses Pequea Creek into Salisbury Township and continues through rural areas, passing through the community of Buyerstown. PA 772 reaches its eastern terminus at an intersection with US 30 (Lincoln Highway) to the west of the community of Gap. At this junction, the route crosses the westbound lanes of US 30 before ending at the eastbound lanes of US 30.

== History ==
Pennsylvania Route 141
- Location: Marietta – Mount Joy
- Existed: 1928–1980s

The portion of PA 772 east of Rothsville follows the Newport Road, a colonial road that connected Mount Hope, Pennsylvania to Newport, Delaware and was used to send wheat from Lancaster County to Delaware. When routes were first legislated in Pennsylvania in 1911, current PA 772 was not given a route number. In 1926, the road between Leacock and Brownstown became a portion of US 222. PA 41 was designated concurrent with this section of US 222 in 1927 before being replaced with PA 240 a year later. In 1928, Fruitville Pike heading south from Manheim became PA 672.

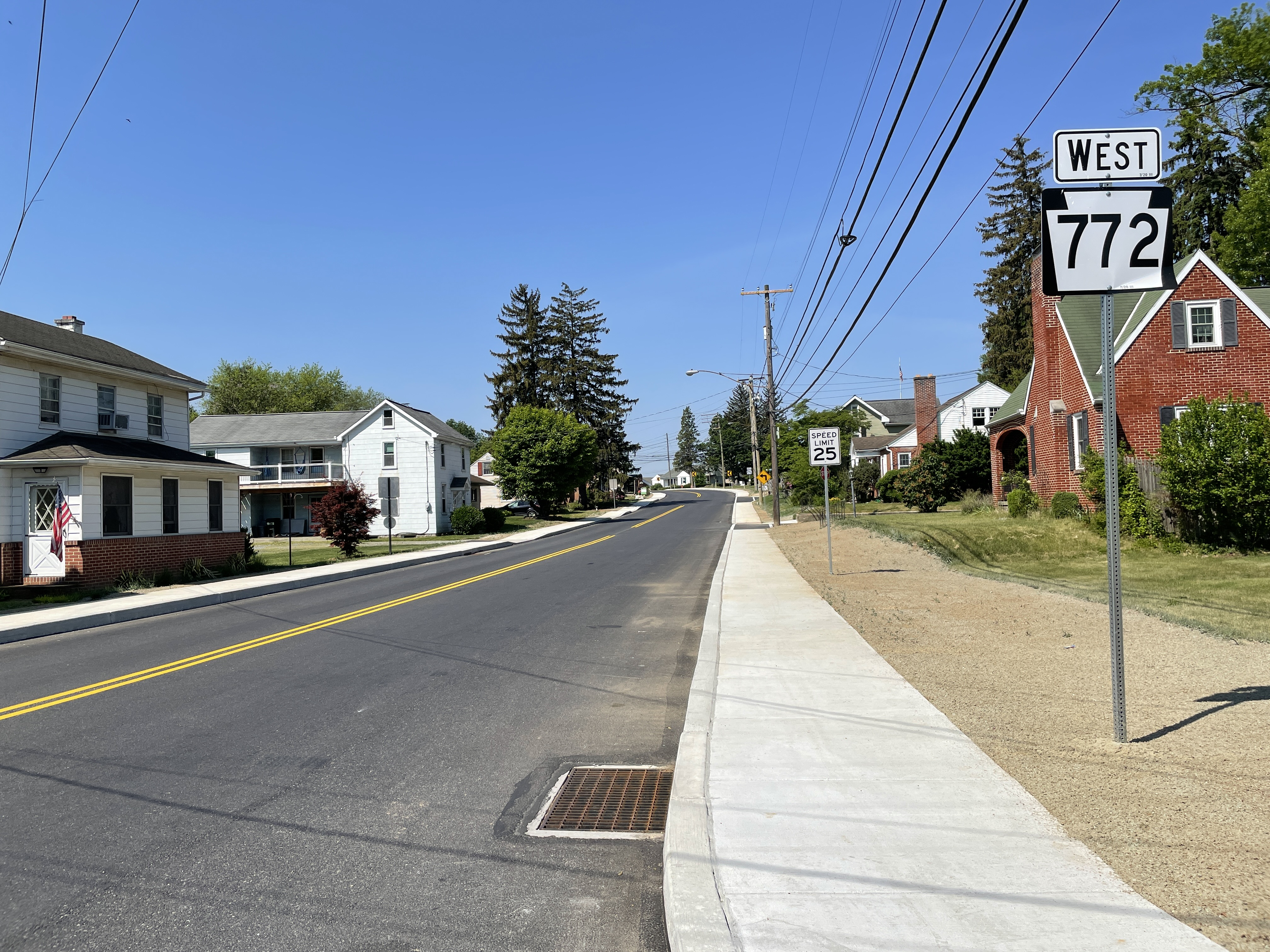
PA 772 westbound in Mount Joy

PA 772 was designated by 1930 to run from PA 672 southeast on Manheim east to US 222 and the eastern terminus of PA 722 at Oregon Pike in Brownstown, following its current alignment on a paved road. PA 141 was designated in 1928 to run from PA 441 in Marietta north to US 230 (now PA 230) in Mount Joy, at which time it was under construction. Also, the concurrent PA 240 designation was removed from US 222. By this time, the road between Mount Joy and Manheim was an unnumbered paved road while Newport Road between Leacock and Gap was unnumbered, with the section between Leacock and Mascot paved and the portion between Mascot and Gap unpaved. In the 1930s, PA 772 was extended south from Brownstown to PA 340 east of Lancaster, replacing a section of US 222 that was realigned. The route followed its current alignment to Leacock where it headed west along PA 23 and southwest along Horseshoe Road to PA 340. Also, PA 672 south of Manheim and the Newport Road between Mascot and Gap were paved. In the 1940s, PA 772 was extended west to PA 72 in Manheim, replacing the northernmost section of PA 672 along Fruitville Pike. In the 1950s, the route was shifted to follow Water Street, Brunnerville Road, and Newport Road between Lititz and Rothsville. By 1962, the southern terminus of PA 141 was cut back to PA 441 north of Marietta following the realignment of that route from Market Street to River Road. PA 772 was shifted back to its previous alignment between Lititz and Rothsville in the 1960s. Also, the route was realigned at Leacock to follow its current alignment along Newport Road southeast to US 30 in Gap. PA 772 was extended west from Manheim to its current terminus at PA 441 in Marietta in the 1980s, replacing the entire length of PA 141 between Marietta and Mount Joy.

Lancaster County commissioned a feasibility study in 2005 to determine the practicality of rerouting PA 772. The new proposed route would have PA 772 cross PA 72 in Manheim and continue along East High Street to Doe Run Road. Doe Run Road becomes West Lincoln Avenue in Warwick Township and Lititz. The proposal then took PA 772 north along PA 501 and east along Newport Road to rejoin its original alignment in Rothsville. Arguments for the rerouting include that there are a low percentage of through-traffic trucks in Lititz, that most truck traffic is either originated or terminated within the borough, that Doe Run Road presents a road in considerably better condition without need for significant improvement such as Temperance Hill Road, that local motorists already prefer the new route, and that the change will qualify the municipalities involved for extra funding from the state. However, PA 772 remains along its current alignment between Manheim and Rothsville.

== Major intersections ==
The entire route is in Lancaster County.

Location	mi	km	Destinations	Notes
East Donegal Township	0.000	0.000	PA 441 (River Road) – Columbia, Middletown, Harrisburg	Western terminus
Mount Joy	4.365	7.025	PA 230 east (East Main Street) – Lancaster	West end of PA 230 concurrency
Mount Joy	4.734	7.619	PA 230 west (West Main Street) – Elizabethtown	East end of PA 230 concurrency
Rapho Township	6.974	11.224	PA 283 – Harrisburg, Lancaster	Interchange
Manheim	12.057	19.404	PA 72 north (North Main Street) – Lebanon	West end of PA 72 concurrency
Manheim	12.525	20.157	PA 72 south (South Main Street) – Lancaster	East end of PA 72 concurrency
Lititz	17.286	27.819	PA 501 south (South Broad Street) – Lancaster	West end of PA 501 concurrency
Lititz	17.401	28.004	PA 501 north (North Broad Street) – Schaefferstown	East end of PA 501 concurrency
West Earl Township	23.240	37.401	PA 272 (Oregon Pike) – Akron, Ephrata, Lancaster	
West Earl Township	23.362– 23.382	37.597– 37.630	US 222 – Ephrata, Lancaster	Interchange
Upper Leacock Township	26.705	42.978	PA 23 west (Main Street)	West end of PA 23 concurrency
Upper Leacock Township	26.948	43.369	PA 23 east (Main Street)	East end of PA 23 concurrency
Leacock Township	32.903	52.952	PA 340 west (Old Philadelphia Pike)	West end of PA 340 concurrency
Leacock Township	33.086	53.247	PA 340 east (Old Philadelphia Pike)	East end of PA 340 concurrency
Salisbury Township	38.412	61.818	US 30 west (Lincoln Highway)	
Salisbury Township	38.495	61.952	US 30 east (Lincoln Highway)	Eastern terminus
1.000 mi = 1.609 km; 1.000 km = 0.621 mi: Concurrency terminus

== PA 772 Truck ==
Pennsylvania Route 772 Truck
- Location: Manheim, Pennsylvania
- Length: 14.8 mi (23.8 km)
- Existed: 2013–present

Pennsylvania Route 772 Truck is an unsigned truck route marked with a blue arrow that bypasses a weight-restricted bridge over the Rife Run in Manheim, Pennsylvania, on which trucks over 30 tons and combination loads over 40 tons are prohibited. The route follows PA 283 and PA 72. It was signed in 2013.
