= Zook's Mill Covered Bridge =

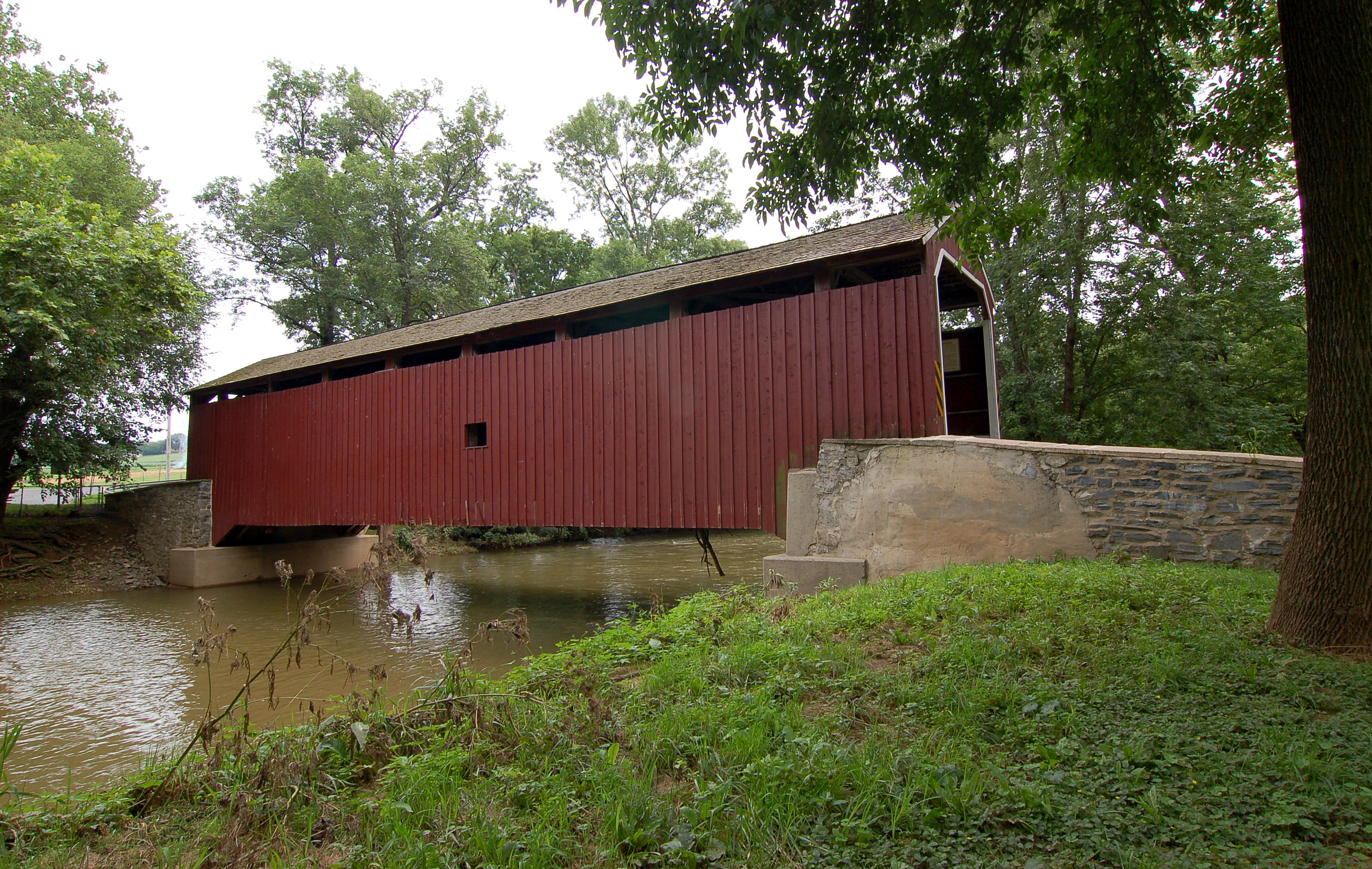
- Coordinates: 40.1302°N 76.2318°W
- Locale: Lancaster County, Pennsylvania, United States
- Official name: Cocalico #7 Bridge

Characteristics
- Design: single span, double Burr arch truss
- Total length: 74 feet (22.6 m)

History
- Constructed by: Henry Zook
- Construction start: 1849
- Zook's Mill Covered Bridge
- U.S. National Register of Historic Places
- MPS: Covered Bridges of Lancaster County TR
- NRHP reference No.: 80003508
- Added to NRHP: December 11, 1980

Location
- Interactive map of Zook's Mill Covered Bridge

The Zook's Mill Covered Bridge is a covered bridge that spans Cocalico Creek in Lancaster County, Pennsylvania, United States. A county-owned and maintained bridge, its official designation is the Cocalico #7 Bridge. The bridge is also known as Wenger Covered Bridge or Rose Hill Covered Bridge. It is located west of Brownstown on T 797, near the Warwick and West Earl Townships.

The bridge has a single span, wooden, double Burr arch trusses design with the addition of steel hanger rods. The deck is made from oak planks. It is painted red, the traditional color of Lancaster County covered bridges, on both the inside and outside. Both approaches to the bridge are painted red with white trim.

The bridge is 74 feet long and 13 feet three inches wide. It has a wooden burr type truss and was built in 1849 by Henry Zook at a cost of only $700US. Unlike many other bridges in the county the bridge withstood a flood caused by Hurricane Agnes in 1972, despite the creek rising more than six feet above the level of the bridge. It is also known as the Wenger Covered Bridge, the Rose Hill Covered Bridge, and the Cocalico #7 Bridge.

The bridge's WGCB Number is 38-36-14. Added in 1980, it is listed on the National Register of Historic Places as structure number 80003508. It is located at 40°7′48.6″N 76°13′54.6″W (40.13017, -76.23183).

The bridge was featured in the 1978 film The Boys from Brazil.

== Dimensions ==
- Length: 74 feet (22.6 m) span and 89 feet (27 m) total length
- Width: 13 feet 3 inches (4.04 m) clear deck and 15 feet (4.6 m) total width
- Overhead clearance: 11 feet 6 inches (3.51 m)
- Underclearance: 9 feet 6 inches (2.90 m)

== Gallery ==
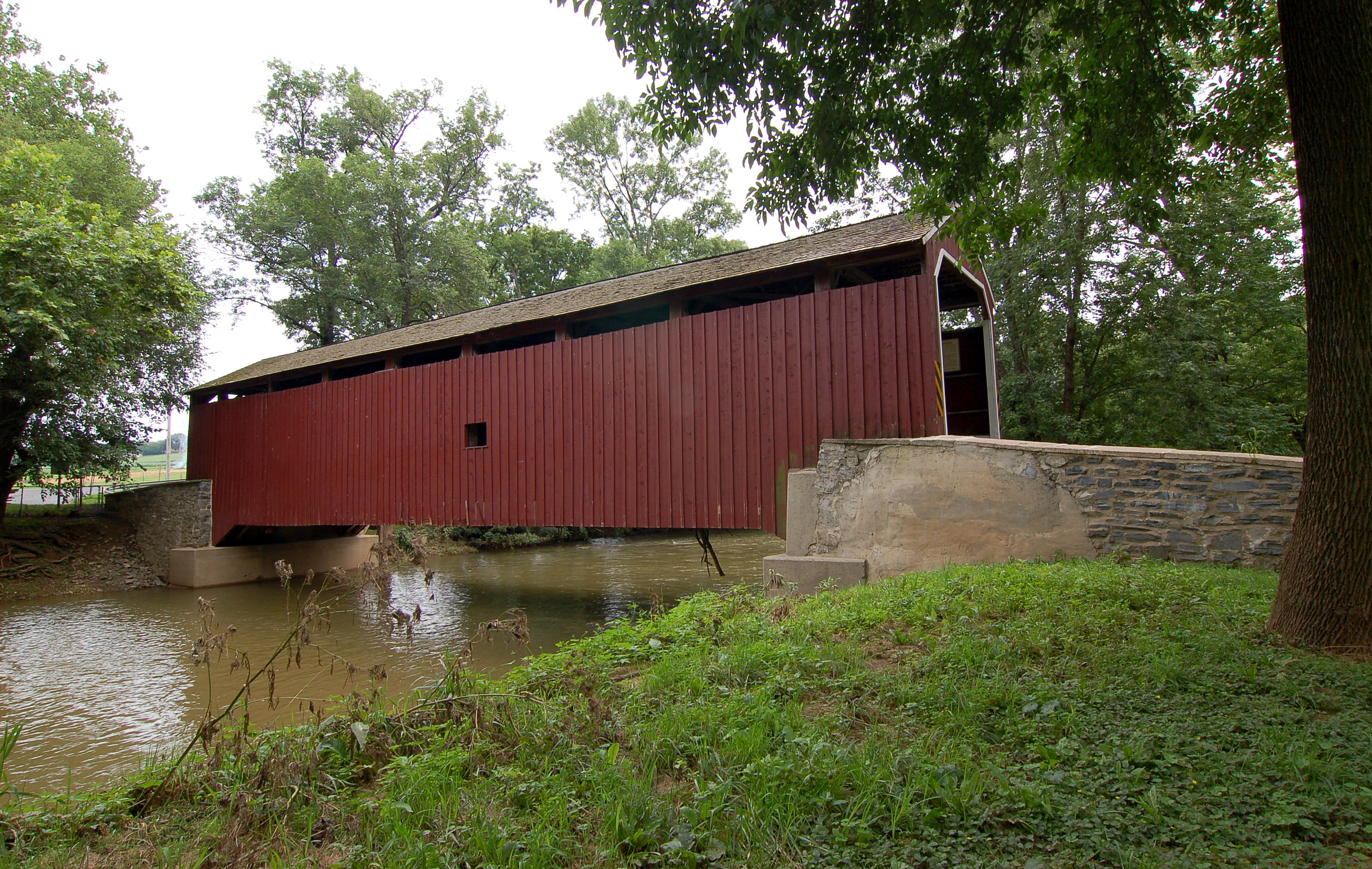

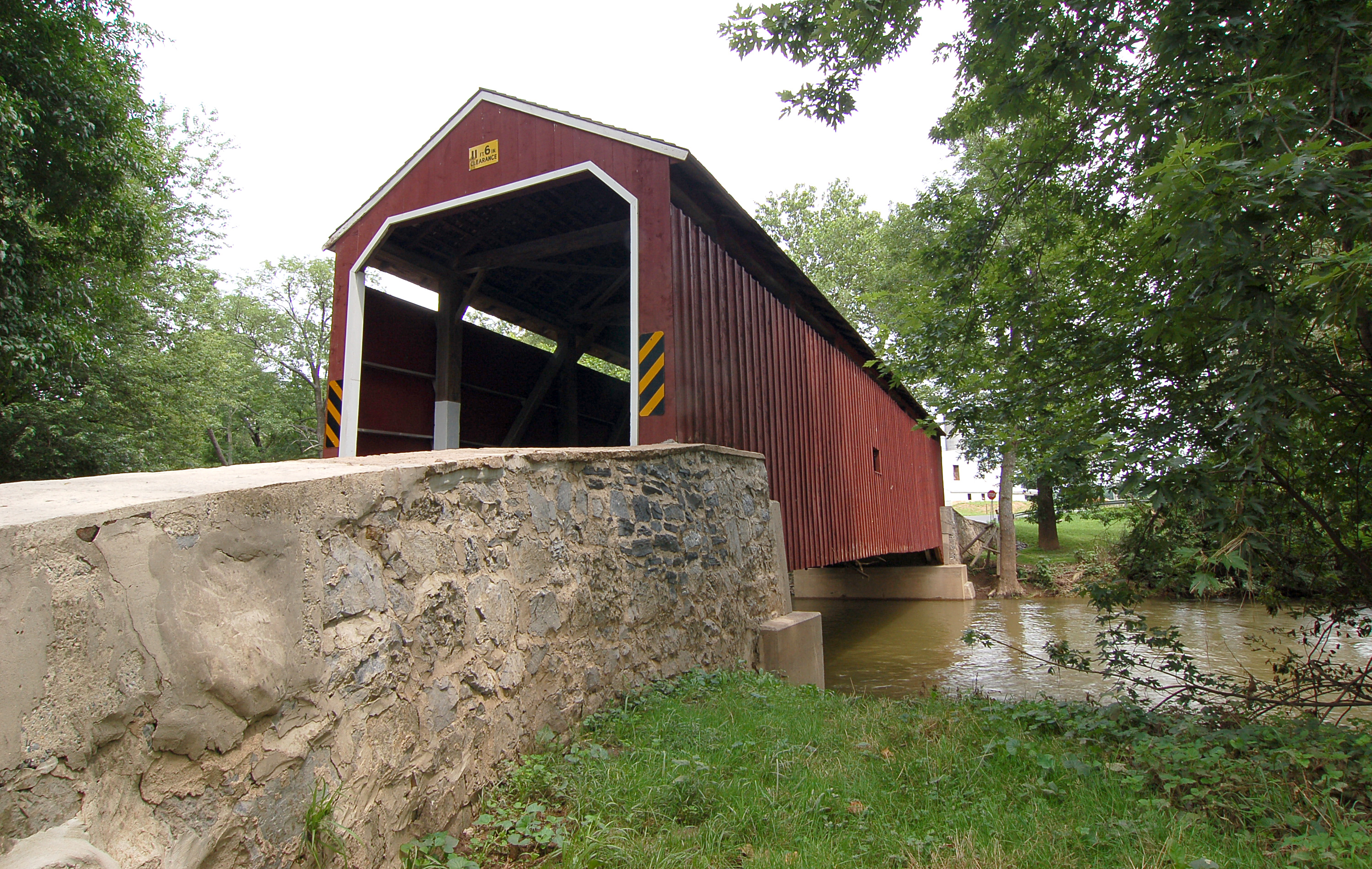

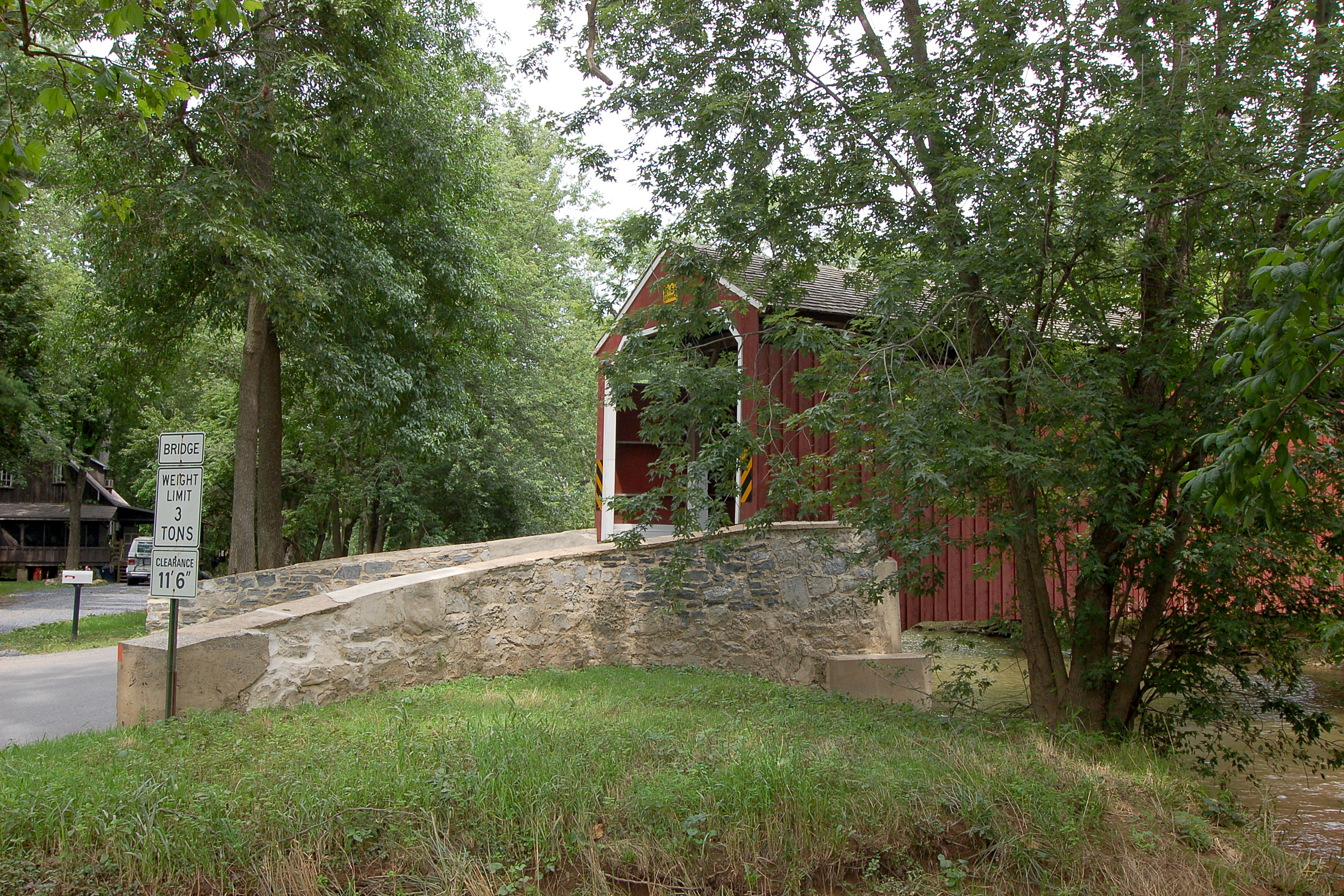

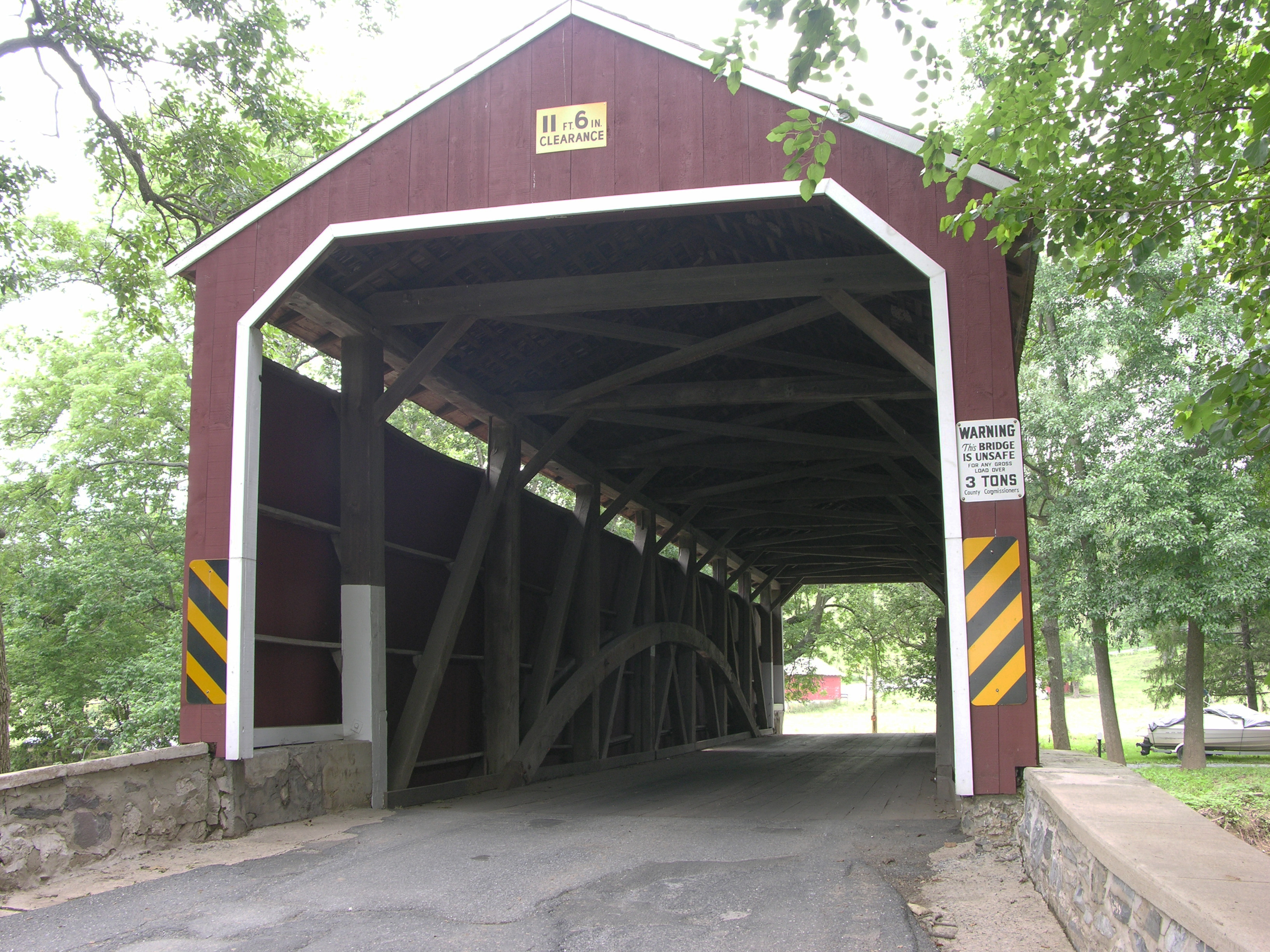

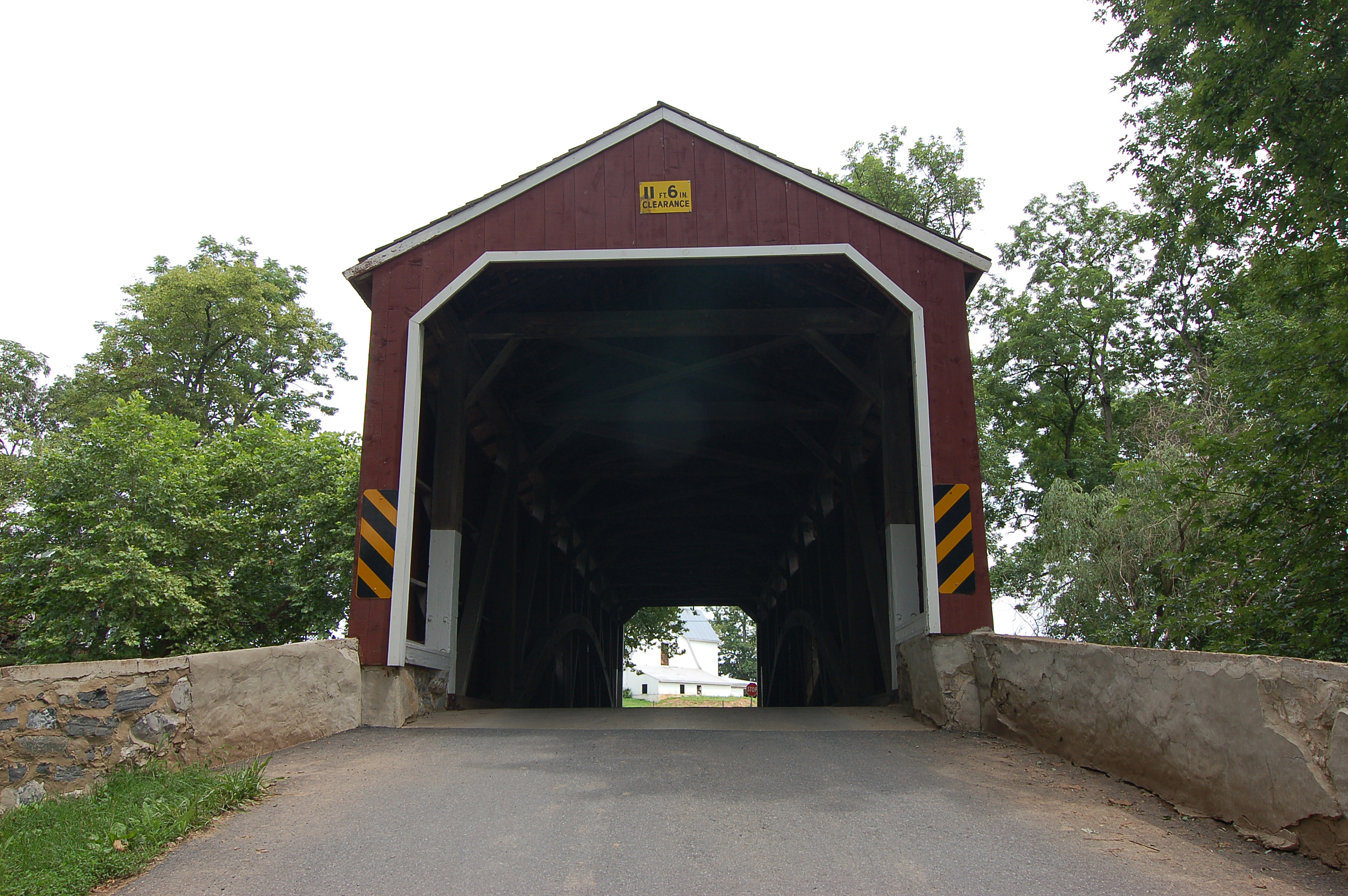

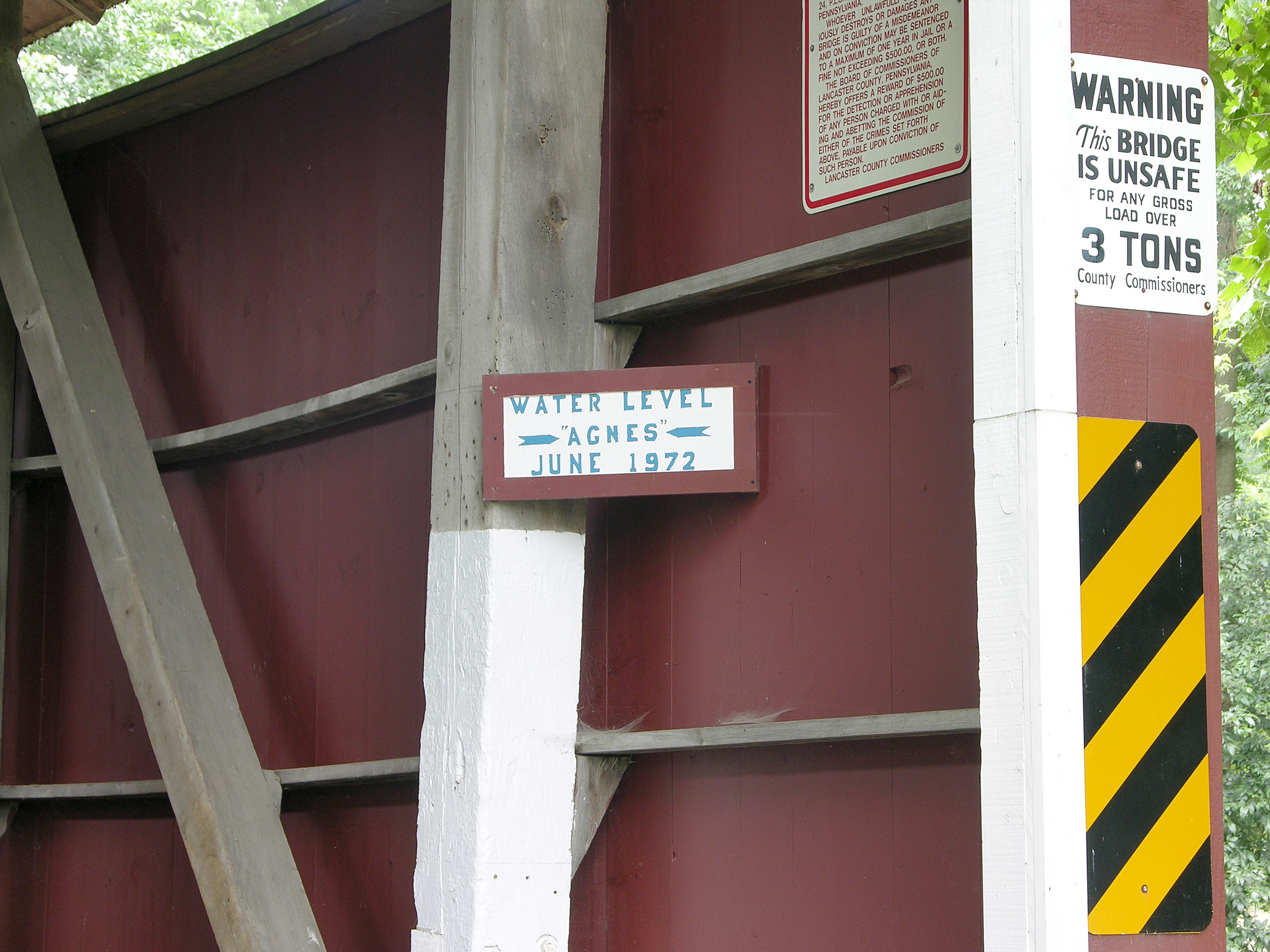

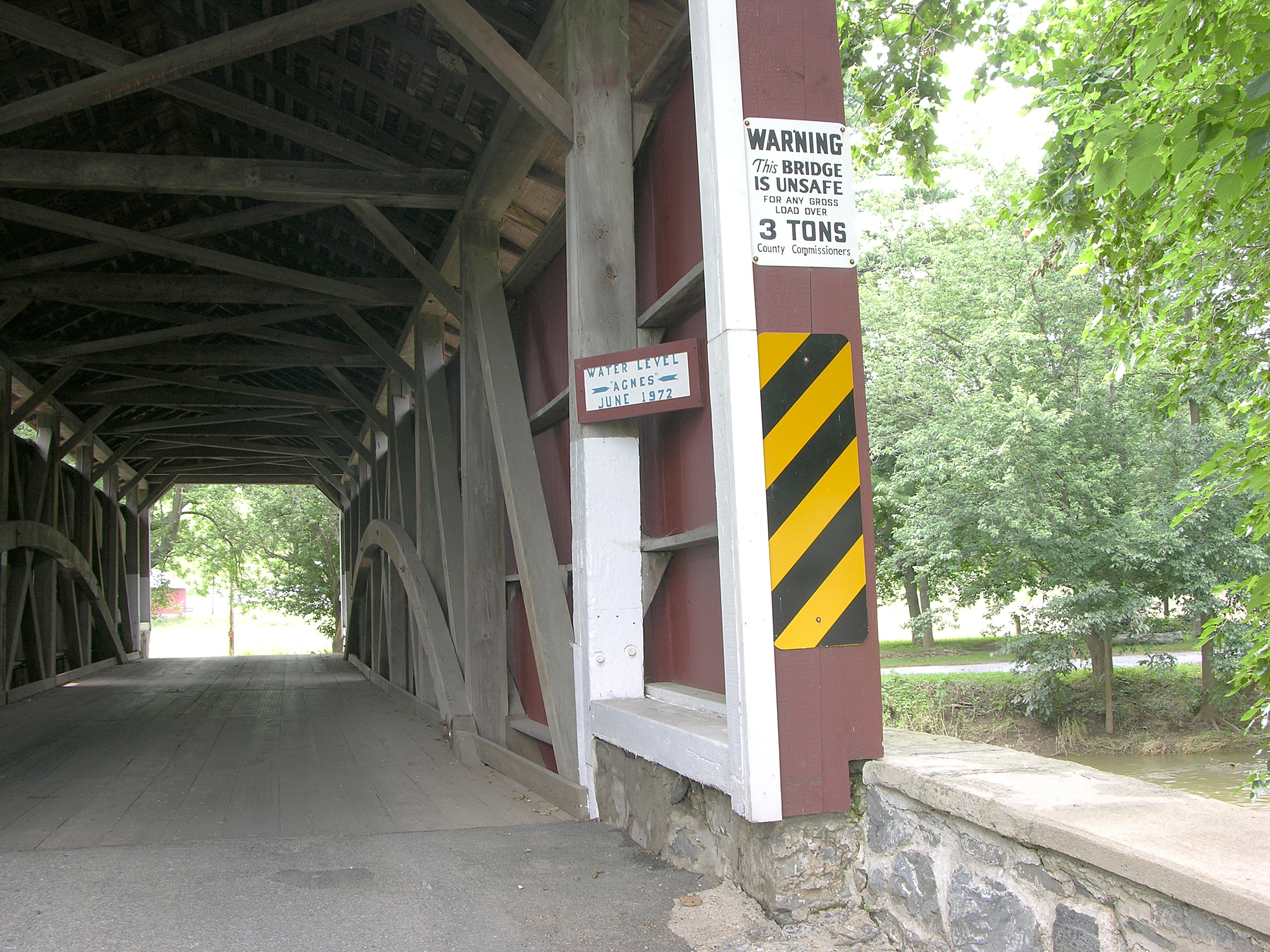

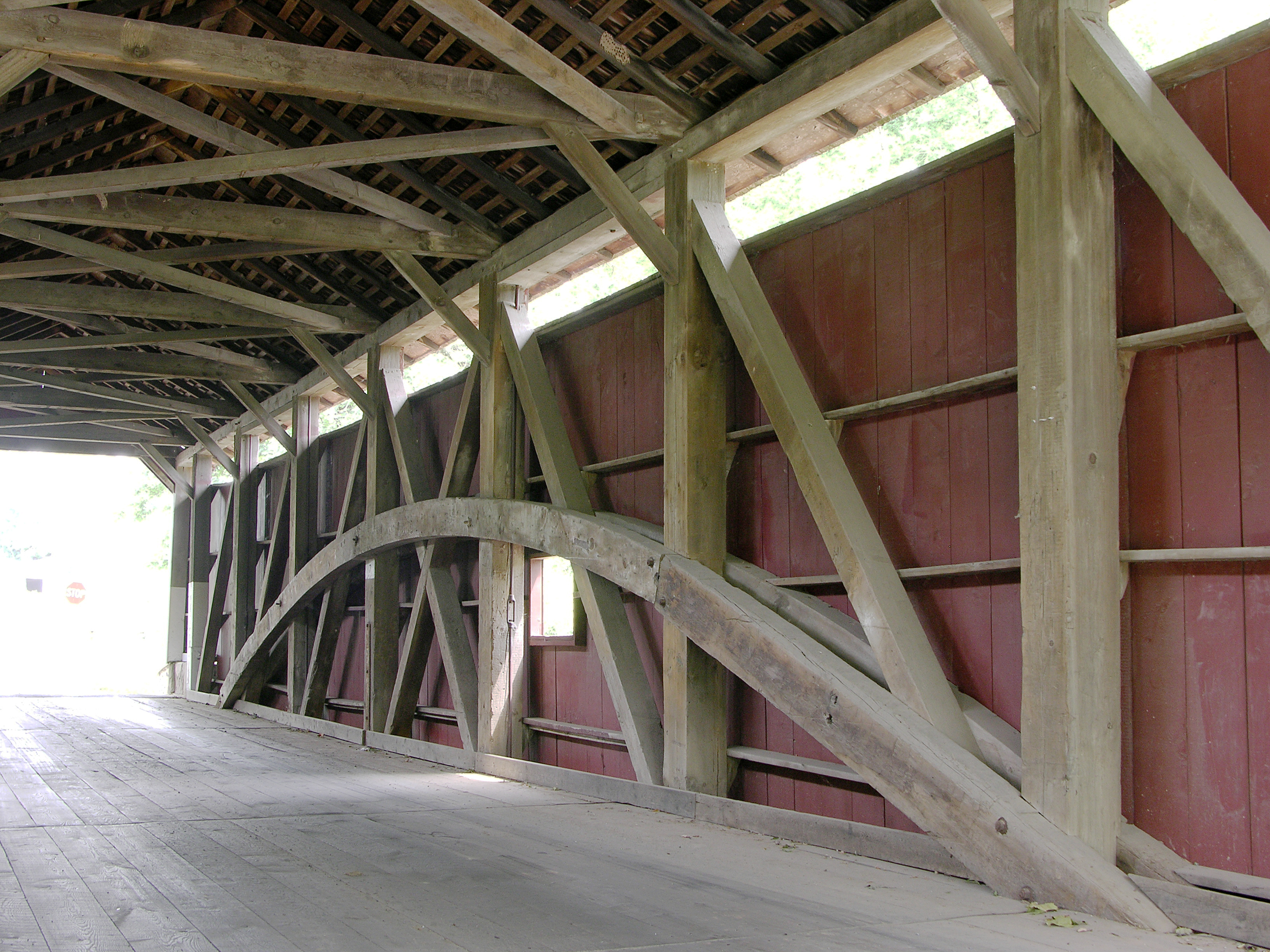

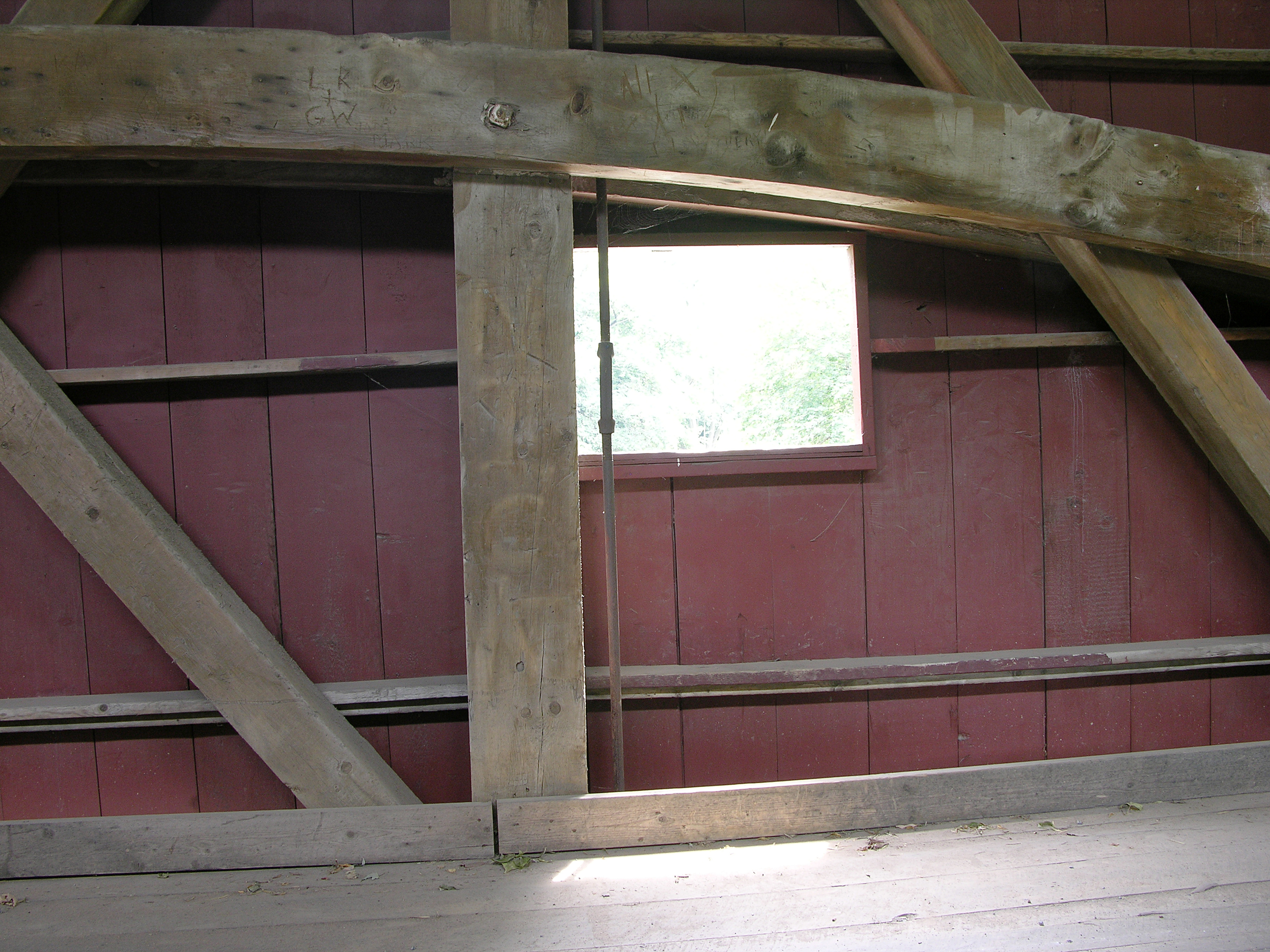

== See also ==
- Burr arch truss
- List of Lancaster County covered bridges
