= Big Conestoga Bridge =

Big Conestoga Bridge may refer to:

Bridges over the Conestoga River in Pennsylvania:
- Bitzer's Mill Covered Bridge (Big Conestoga No. 2 Bridge)
- Pinetown Bushong's Mill Covered Bridge (Big Conestoga No. 6 Bridge)
- Bridge in West Earl Township (Big Conestoga No. 12 Bridge)
