= New Holland Secondary =

Railway line in Pennsylvania, United States

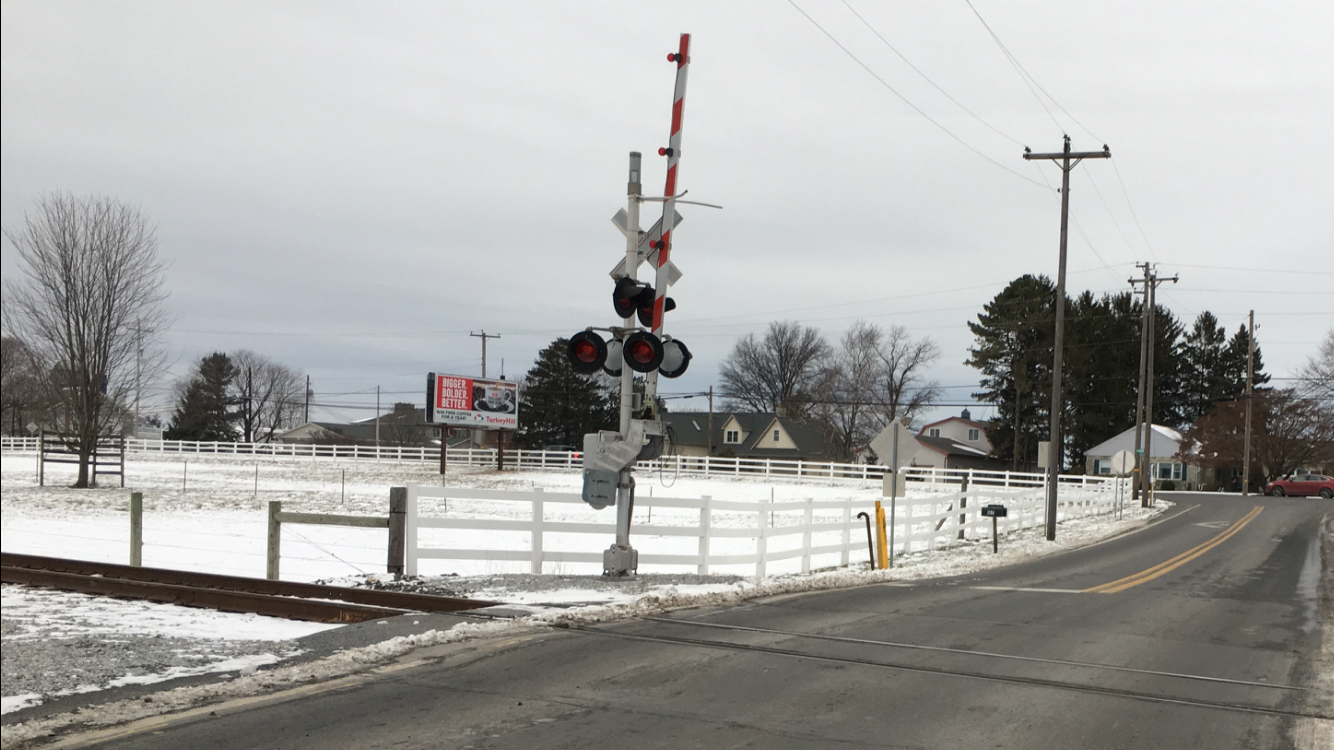
Shows the level crossing of Norfolk Southern's New Holland Secondary over Peters Road in New Holland, Pennsylvania.

The New Holland Secondary is a rail line that runs from Lancaster, Pennsylvania, to New Holland, Pennsylvania, and is owned and operated by Norfolk Southern Railway. It is 12 miles long, single tracked, and originally ran from Lancaster to Downingtown, Pennsylvania, but all track between New Holland and Downingtown has since been abandoned. The line branches off of track 4 of the Amtrak owned Philadelphia to Harrisburg Main Line (originally part of the Main Line of the Pennsylvania Railroad) at Cork Interlocking, milepost 67.0 in Lancaster.

The rail line was originally built by the East Brandywine and Waynesburg Railroad, but has changed hands quite a few times since its construction in 1854. It came into the possession of the Pennsylvania Railroad in 1903, Penn Central in 1968, Conrail in 1976, and in 1999 it was acquired by Norfolk Southern Railway, where it remains today. The line serves as a branch line for freight delivery, and services a number of businesses along its path, including RR Donnelley and Sons Printing, HM Stauffer, the Leola Dart Container plant, and L&S Sweeteners. The line is operated five days a week, mostly at night and early morning to avoid high traffic in New Holland.

== Infrastructure ==
The New Holland Secondary has no bridges, but does have 25 level crossings over named roads. (26 if the crossing over Norman Road, in Lancaster, Pennsylvania, which is not crossed by the main line, is included). The line also crosses over several privately owned or unnamed lanes. The crossings over named roads are as follows:

The path of the New Holland Secondary as a dark gray dotted line from its branching off of the Amtrak Philadelphia to Harrisburg Main Line in Lancaster, Pennsylvania (bottom left) to its end in New Holland, Pennsylvania (top right).

=== Lancaster ===
Greenfield Road
Jefferson Drive
Willow Road
Hartman Station Road
(Norman Road)
Industrial Circuit
Horseshoe Road

=== Leola ===
Creek Hill Road
Newport Road (PA 772)
Farmland Road
Graybill Road
Hess Road
Zimmerman Road
Trinity Drive
S Groffdale Road

=== New Holland ===
Peters Road
S Shirk Road
George C Delp Road
S Hoover Avenue
Brubaker Avenue
Diller Avenue
S Custer Avenue
S Railroad Avenue
Brimmer Avenue
S Kinzer Avenue
Ranck Road

== See also ==
- List of Norfolk Southern Railway lines
