= Mascot Roller Mills =

- U.S. National Register of Historic Places
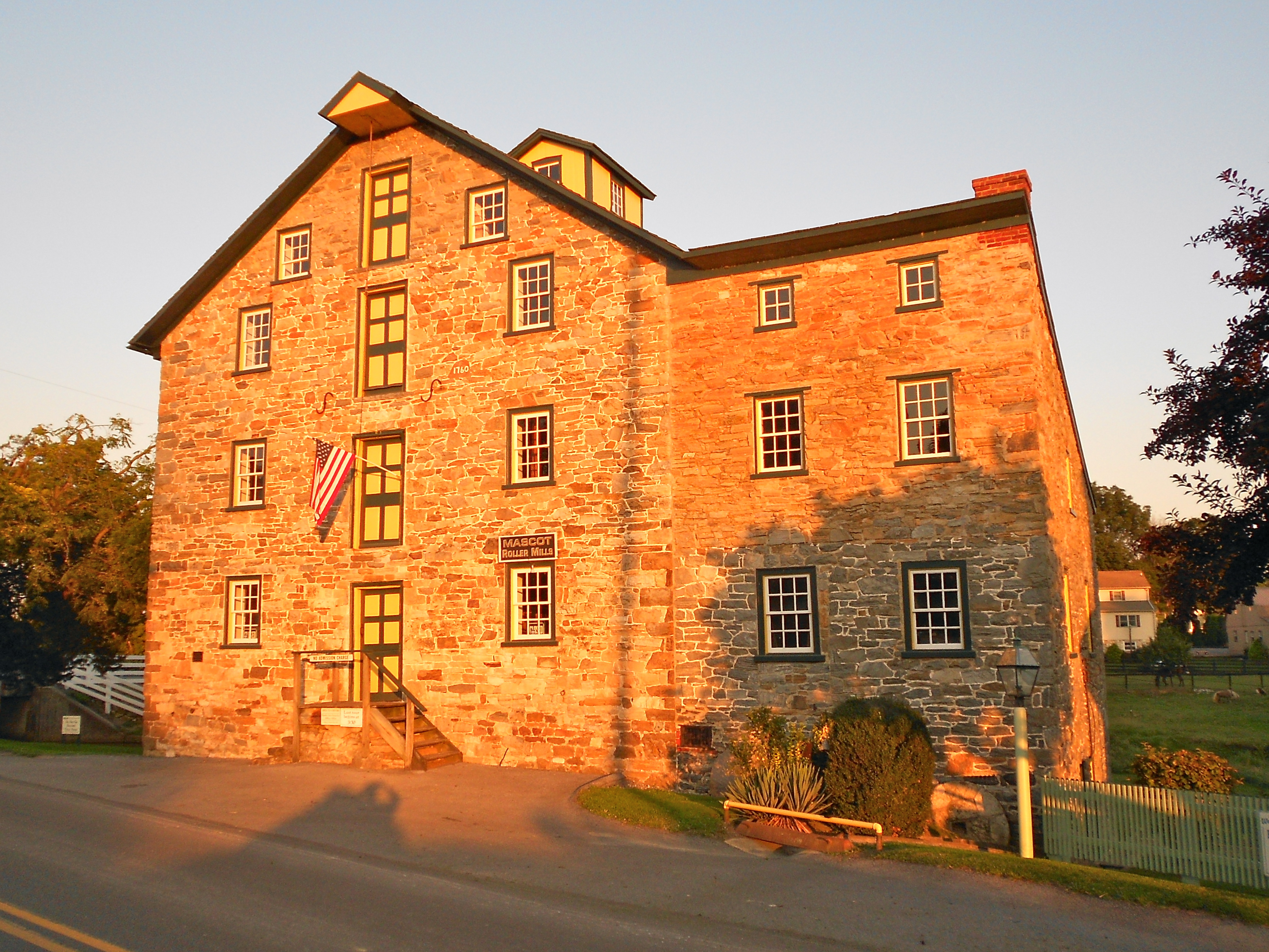
- The mill in 2012

- Location within Pennsylvania Location within the United States
- Location: Newport and Stumptown Rds., Mascot, Upper Leacock Township, Pennsylvania
- Coordinates: 40°3′46″N 76°9′26″W
- Area: less than one acre
- Built: 1737
- NRHP reference No.: 83002255
- Added to NRHP: September 29, 1983

Mascot Roller Mills, also known as Ressler's Mill, is an historic grist mill complex in Upper Leacock Township, Lancaster County, Pennsylvania, United States.

It was listed on the National Register of Historic Places in 1983.

== History and architectural features ==
This complex consists of the mill, a miller's house, a summer kitchen, and a frame barn. The original section of the mill was built in 1737. The machinery was installed in 1906. It is a three-story, L-shaped, stone building with a gable roof and cupola. The house was built in 1855, and is a two-story, gable-roofed, brick banked building. The summer kitchen that is adjacent to the house is a one-story, brick structure. The small frame barn dates to the late-nineteenth century. It is the oldest continuously operating grist mill in Lancaster County.

== Gallery ==
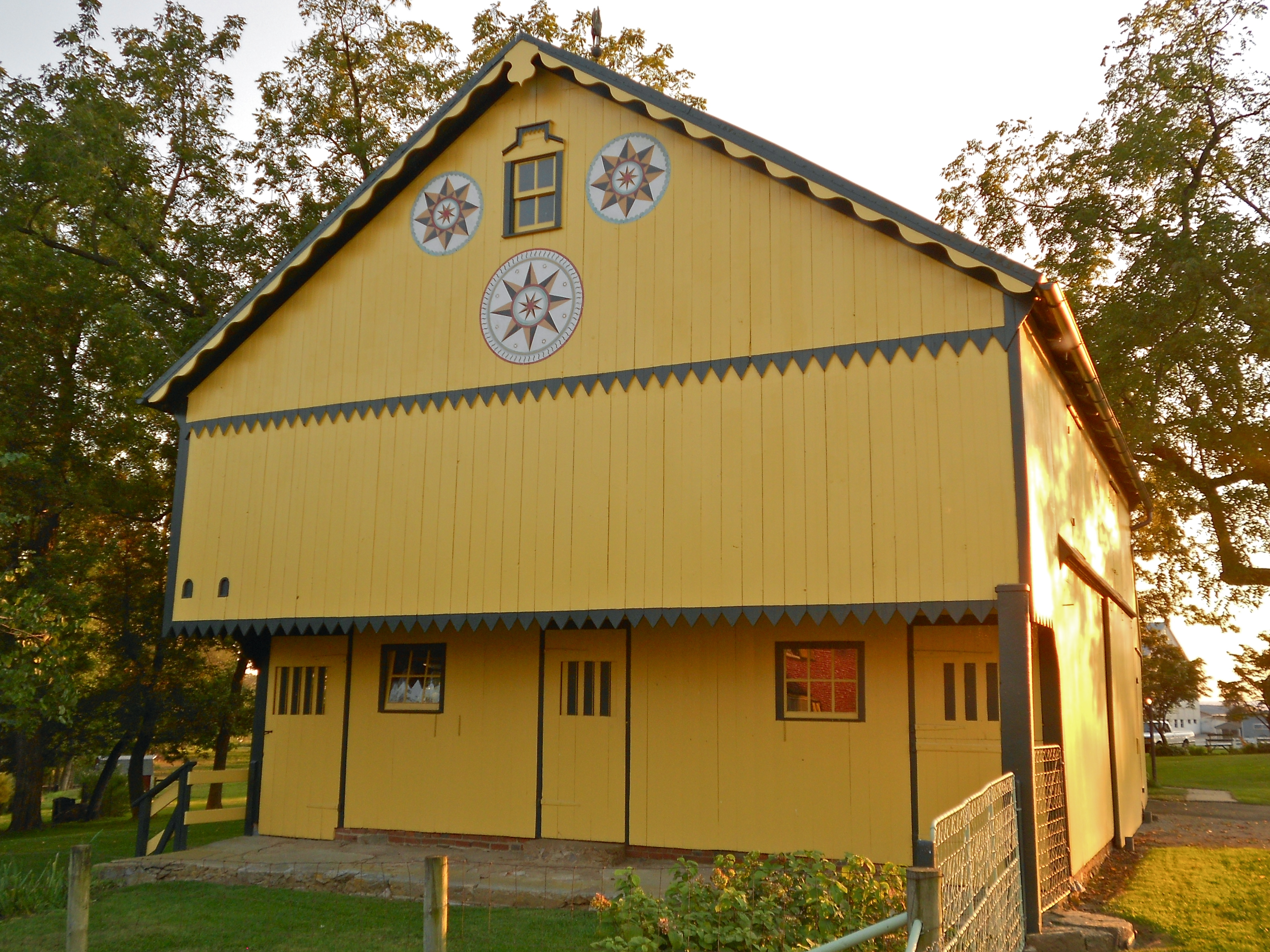
Barn with painted hex signs
