= Brownstown, Lancaster County, Pennsylvania =

Unincorporated community in Pennsylvania, US

Brownstown, Pennsylvania Brauneschteddel (Pennsylvania German)
- Census-designated place
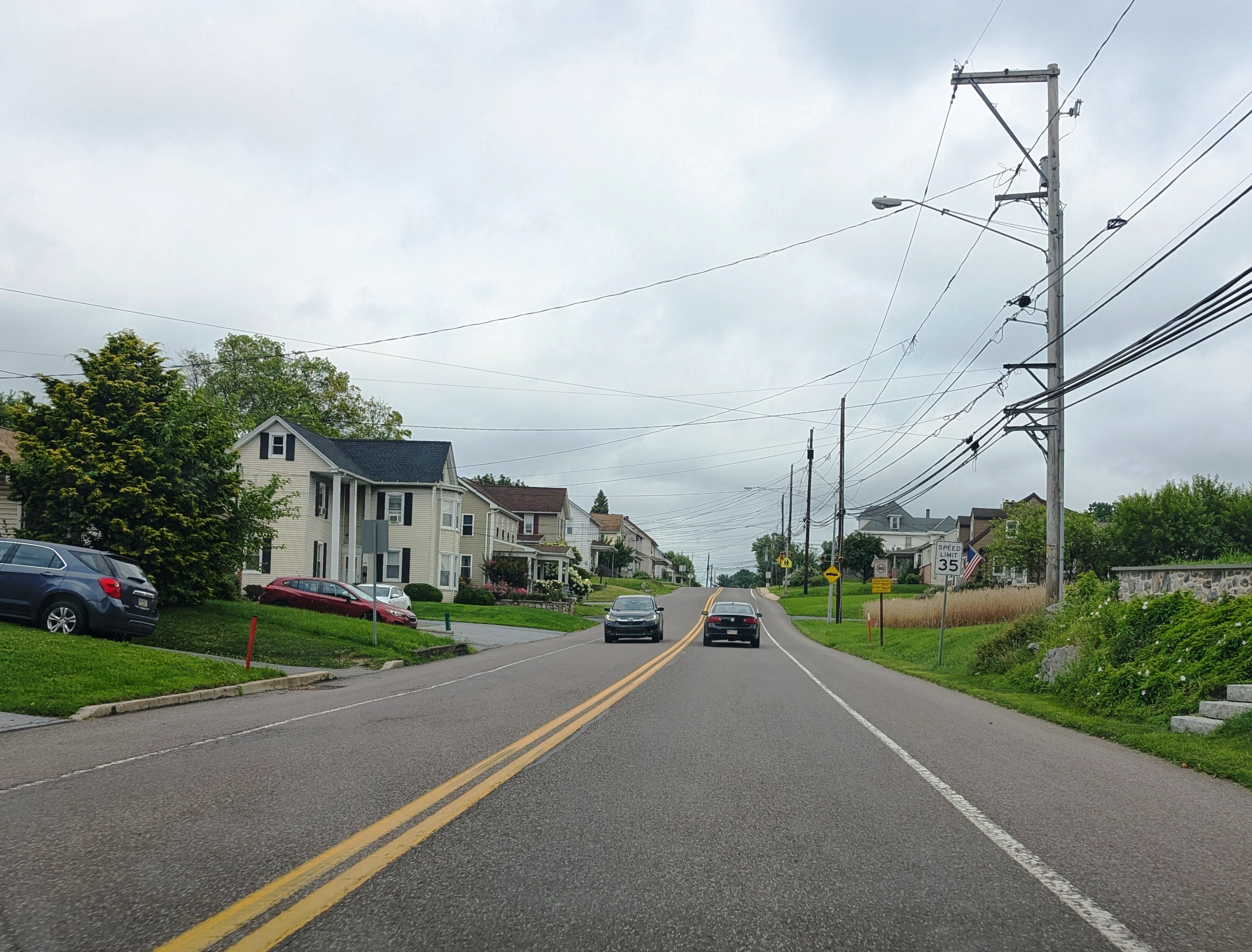
- PA 772 westbound through Brownstown

- Location in Pennsylvania Location in the United States
- Coordinates: 40°07′25″N 76°12′50″W
- Country: United States
- State: Pennsylvania
- County: Lancaster
- Township: West Earl

Area
  - Total: 2.54 sq mi (6.57 km^{2})
  - Land: 2.49 sq mi (6.44 km^{2})
  - Water: 0.050 sq mi (0.13 km^{2})
- Elevation: 340 ft (100 m)

Population (2020)
  - Total: 3,081
  - Density: 1,239/sq mi (478.5/km^{2})
- Time zone: UTC-5 (Eastern (EST))
  - Summer (DST): UTC-4 (EDT)
- ZIP code: 17508
- Area code: 717
- FIPS code: 42-09416
- GNIS feature ID: 1170414

Brownstown (Pennsylvania German: Brauneschteddel) is an unincorporated community and census-designated place (CDP) in West Earl Township, Pennsylvania, United States. As of the 2010 census, the population was 2,816.

== Geography ==
Brownstown is in central Lancaster County, in the western section of West Earl Township. It is 5 miles (8 km) southwest of Ephrata and 9 miles (14 km) northeast of Lancaster, the county seat.

The main route through Brownstown is Pennsylvania Route 772 (South State Street), which leads northwest 6 miles (10 km) to Lititz and southeast 3 miles (5 km) to Leola. U.S. Route 222, a four-lane expressway, runs just to the west of the center of town, with access via an interchange with PA 772. US 222 leads northeast 24 miles (39 km) to Reading and southwest to Lancaster. Route 272 runs parallel to and northwest of Route 222. The intersection of routes 772 and 272 is currently one of the most heavily traveled areas in Lancaster County.

According to the U.S. Census Bureau, the Brownstown CDP has a total area of 2.5 square miles (6.6 km^{2}), of which 0.04 square miles (0.1 km^{2}), or 1.92%, are water. The Conestoga River forms the southern boundary of the community, and Cocalico Creek forms the western boundary (and of West Earl Township), joining the Conestoga southwest of the center of town. It is part of the Susquehanna River watershed.

== Demographics ==
Historical population
Census	Pop.	Note	%±
2020	3,081		—
U.S. Decennial Census
