= Talmage, Pennsylvania =

Unincorporated community in Pennsylvania, US

- Unincorporated community
- Location in Pennsylvania Location in the United States
- Coordinates: 40°6′57″N 76°12′48″W
- Country: United States
- State: Pennsylvania
- County: Lancaster
- Township: West Earl
- Time zone: UTC-5 (Eastern (EST))
  - Summer (DST): UTC-4 (EDT)
- ZIP code: 17580
- Area code: 717
- GNIS feature ID: 1189239

Talmage is an unincorporated community in West Earl Township, Lancaster County, Pennsylvania, United States. Talmage is located between Brownstown and Leola.
