= Cocalico Creek =

Coordinates: 40.20713°N 76.13898°W

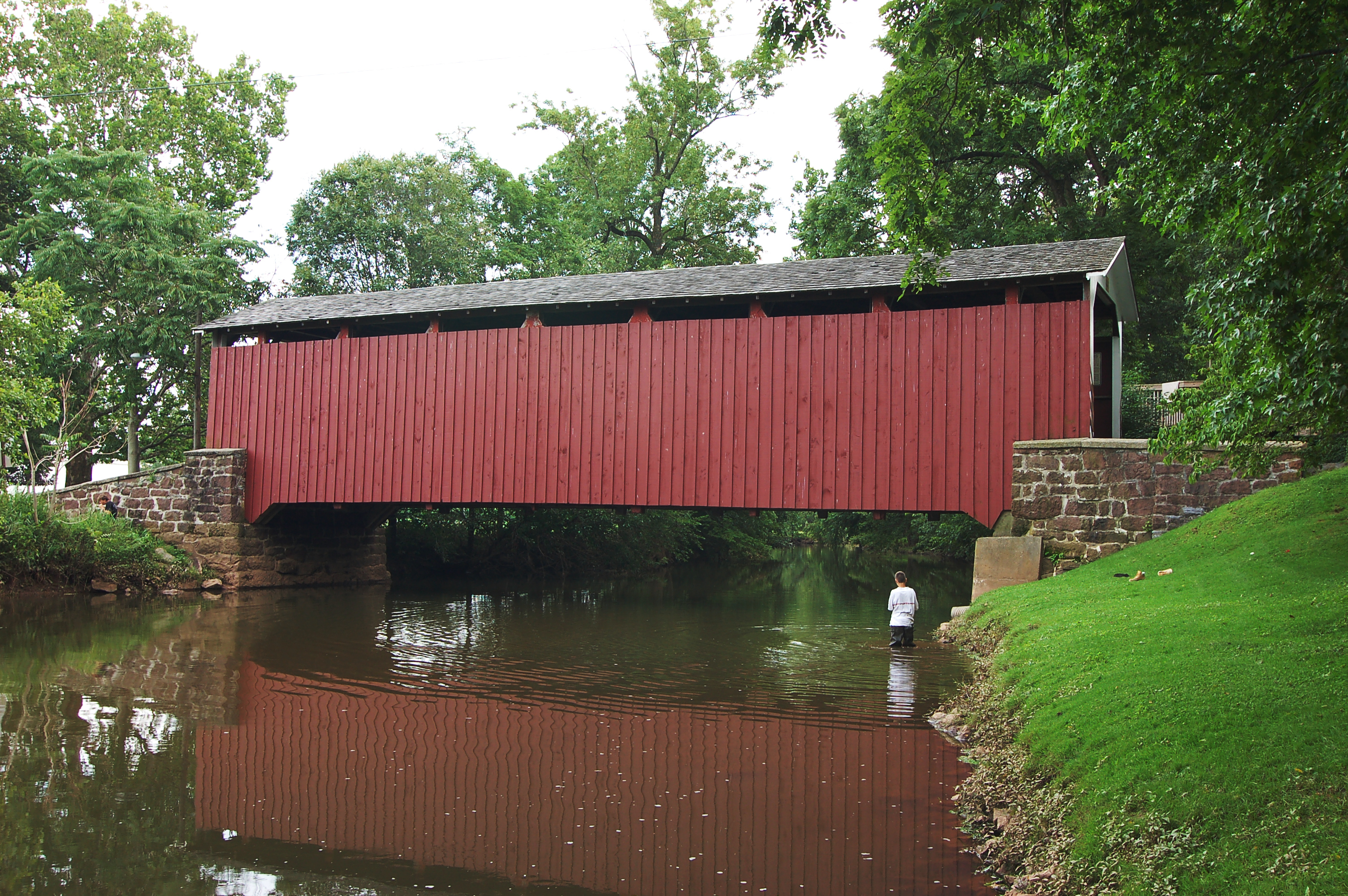
- Bucher's Mill Covered Bridge spans Cocalico Creek in Lancaster County, Pennsylvania

Location
- Country: Lebanon and Lancaster Counties, Pennsylvania, United States

Physical characteristics
- Source
  - location: Stricklerstown, Pennsylvania
  - elevation: 1,320 feet (400 m)
- Mouth
  - location: Conestoga River at Talmage, Pennsylvania
  - elevation: 278 feet (85 m)
- Length: 27.2 mi (43.8 km)
- Basin size: 140 mi^{2} (360 km^{2})

Cocalico Creek is a 27.2-mile-long (43.8 km) tributary of the Conestoga River in Lebanon and Lancaster counties in Pennsylvania in the United States. The source is at an elevation of 1,320 feet (400 m) near Stricklerstown in Millcreek Township, Lebanon County. The mouth is the confluence with the Conestoga River at an elevation of 278 feet (85 m) at Talmage in West Earl Township, Lancaster County.

The name of the creek comes from the Lenape, meaning "snake dens". It comes from the Lenape word Gookcalicunk (pronounced "Gook Cal-eek Unk), which means "Snake Sleep Place" in English. The Lenape considered modern East Cocalico, West Cocalico, Clay, Warwick, Elizabeth, and Penn townships in Lancaster County, Mill Creek Township in Lebanon County, and the Middle Creek Wildlife Management Area as part of Gookcalicunk.

Cocalico Creek flows south for 10 miles (16 km), then southwest 16 miles (26 km). The Cocalico Creek watershed has a total area of 140 square miles (360 km^{2}) and is part of the larger Chesapeake Bay drainage basin via the Susquehanna River.

== Tributaries ==
- Hammer Creek
- Middle Creek
- Meadow Run
- Indian Run
- Cooper Run
- Stony Run
- Little Cocalico Creek

== See also ==
- List of rivers of Pennsylvania
