= Bitzer's Mill Covered Bridge =

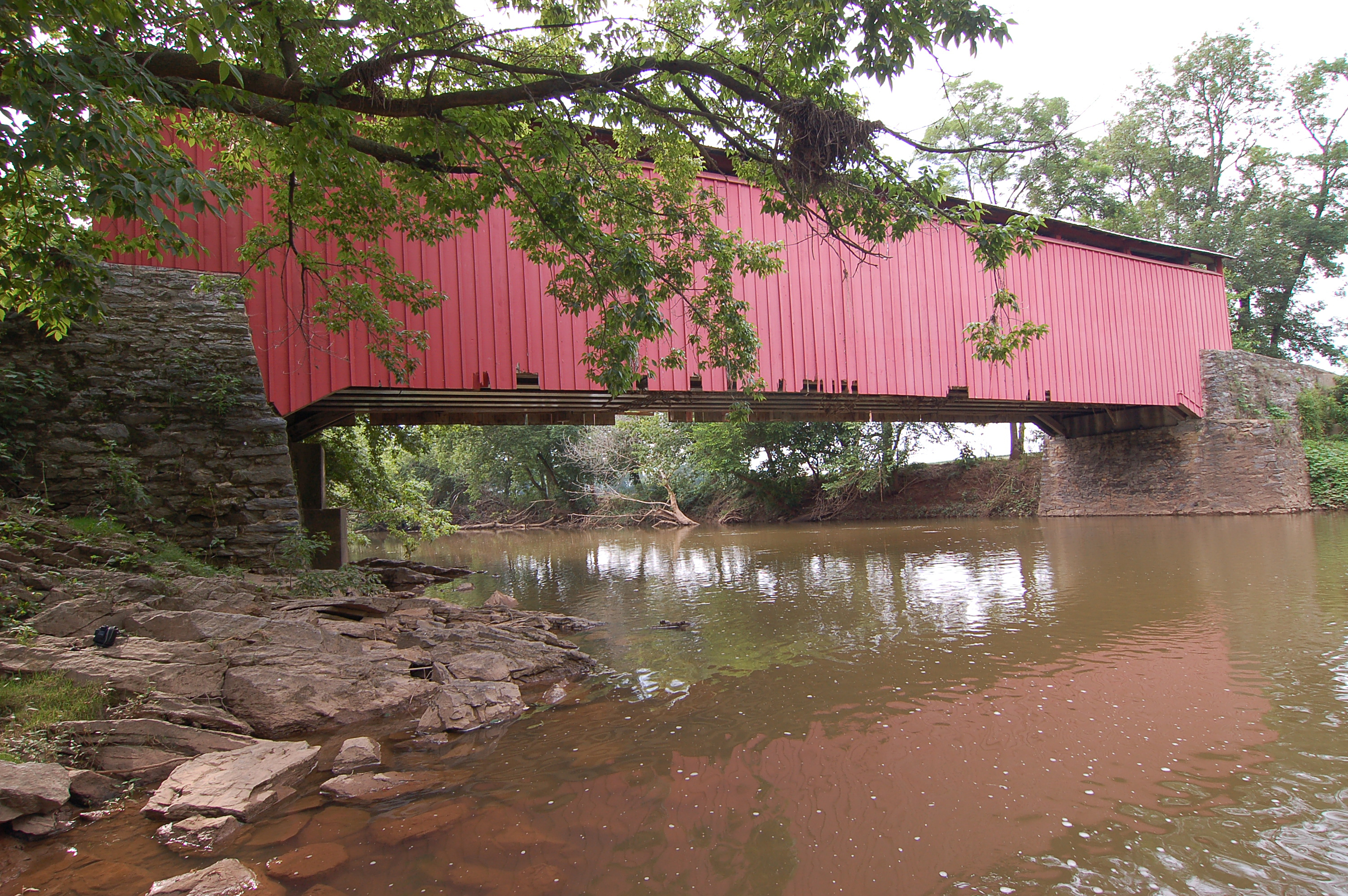
- East side of the bridge
- Coordinates: 40°8′25.5″N 76°9′7″W
- Carries: SR 1013
- Crosses: Conestoga River
- Locale: Lancaster, Pennsylvania, United States
- Official name: Big Conestoga #2 Bridge
- Other name(s): Eberly's Cider Mill, Martin's Mill, Big Conestoga #2, Fiand's, Fiantz's
- Maintained by: Lancaster County
- NBI Number: 361013025007460

Characteristics
- Total length: 90 ft (27 m)
- Width: 15 ft (4.6 m)
- Height: 11.5 ft (3.5 m)
- Load limit: 20 short tons (18 t)

History
- Constructed by: George Fink, Sam Reamsnyder
- Built: 1846
- Bitzer's Mill Covered Bridge
- U.S. National Register of Historic Places
- MPS: Covered Bridges of Lancaster County TR
- NRHP reference No.: 80003516
- Added to NRHP: December 11, 1980

Location
- Interactive map of Bitzer's Mill Covered Bridge

The Bitzer's Mill Covered Bridge is a covered bridge that spans the Conestoga River in Lancaster County, Pennsylvania, United States. It is the oldest bridge in the county still in use. A county-owned and maintained bridge, its official designation is the Big Conestoga #2 Bridge. The bridge is also called Martin's Mill Bridge, Eberly's Cider Mill Covered Bridge, and Fiand's/Fiantz's Covered Bridge.

The bridge has a single span, wooden, double Burr arch trusses design with the addition of steel hanger rods. The deck is made from oak planks. Added later, secondary steel I-beams support the bridge from underneath. The bridge is painted red on the outside, the traditional color of Lancaster County covered bridges. The inside of the bridge is not painted. Both approaches to the bridge are painted in the traditional white color. As of July 2006, the bridge has some damage to its sides including some missing or broken panels.

The bridge, which has a 10 foot 6 inch height restriction, was damaged again on November 20, 2023, this time by a 13 feet 4 inches tall semi-trailer which got stuck in the bridge and allegedly caused further damage by attempting to back out after being stuck.

The bridge's WGCB Number is 38-36-04. In 1980 it was added to the National Register of Historic Places as structure number 80003516. It is located at 40°8′25.8″N 76°9′7.2″W (40.1405, -76.1520) near the junction of U.S. Route 222 and U.S. Route 322 southeast of Ephrata in West Earl Township. The bridge can be reached by going approximately 1.5 miles (2.4 km) south from U.S. Route 322 on Cabin Drive which becomes Conestoga Creek Road. A left onto Cider Mill Road leads straight to the bridge, which is visible from the intersection.

== History ==
The bridge was built in 1846 by George Fink and Sam Reamsnyder at a cost of $1,115. They used a single span, wooden, double Burr arch truss construction. At some point later, steel I-beams were installed under the floor to add support to the oldest bridge in Lancaster County. The bridge has historically been referred to by a number of names that reflected the various mill owners. In 1962, it was proposed to replace the bridge with a concrete span, but the plan was discontinued after much public outcry.

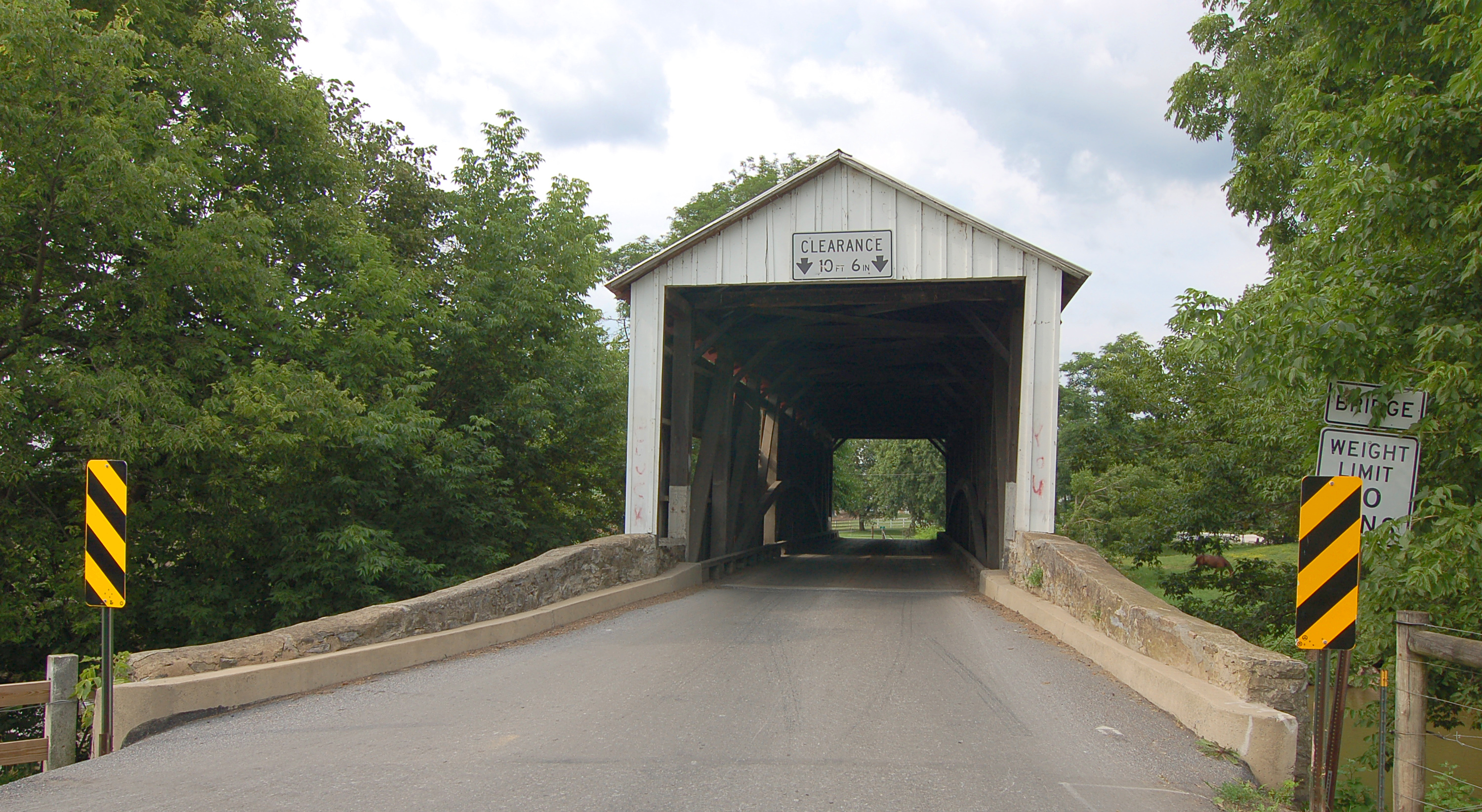
Looking north (2006)

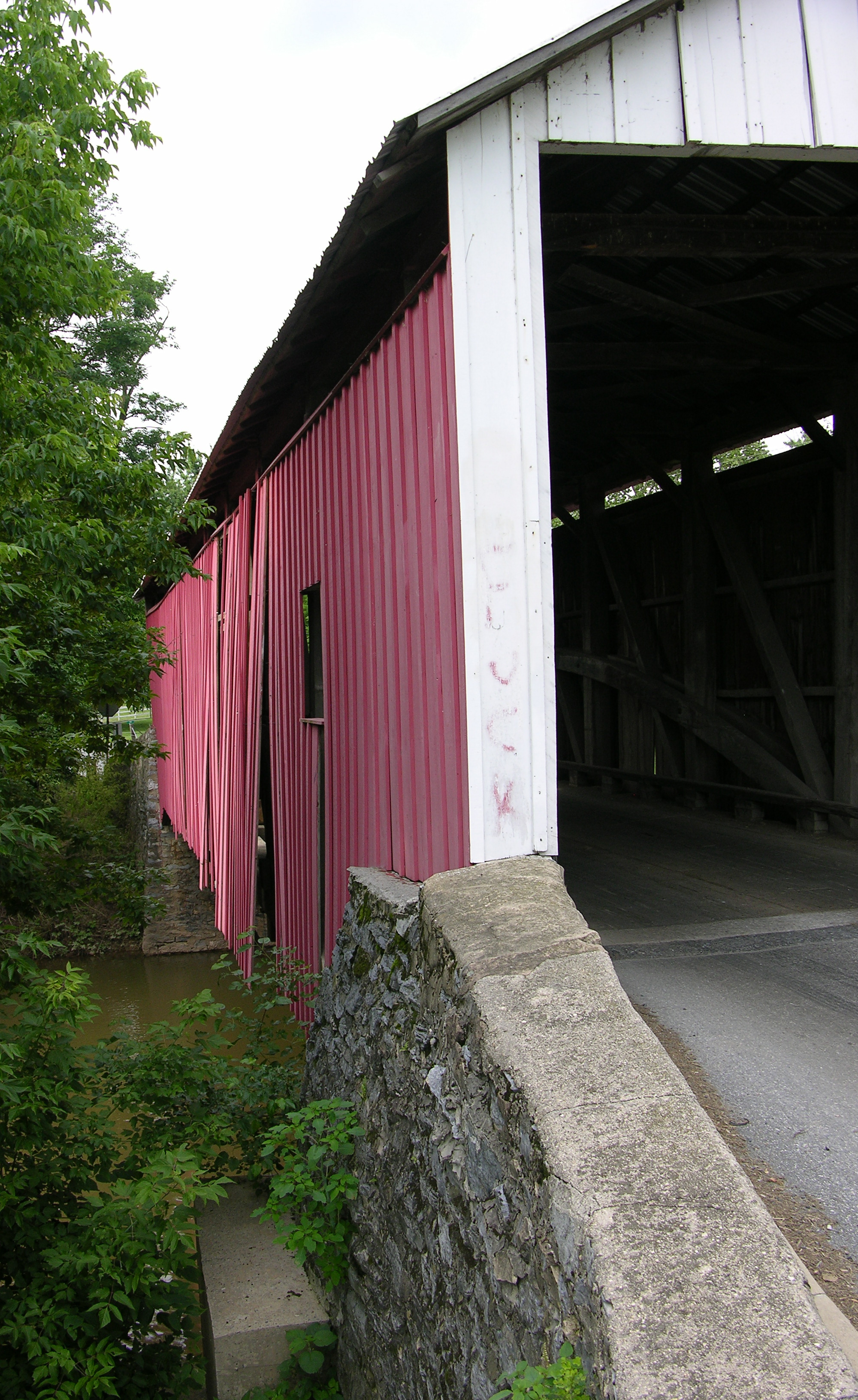
West side (2006)

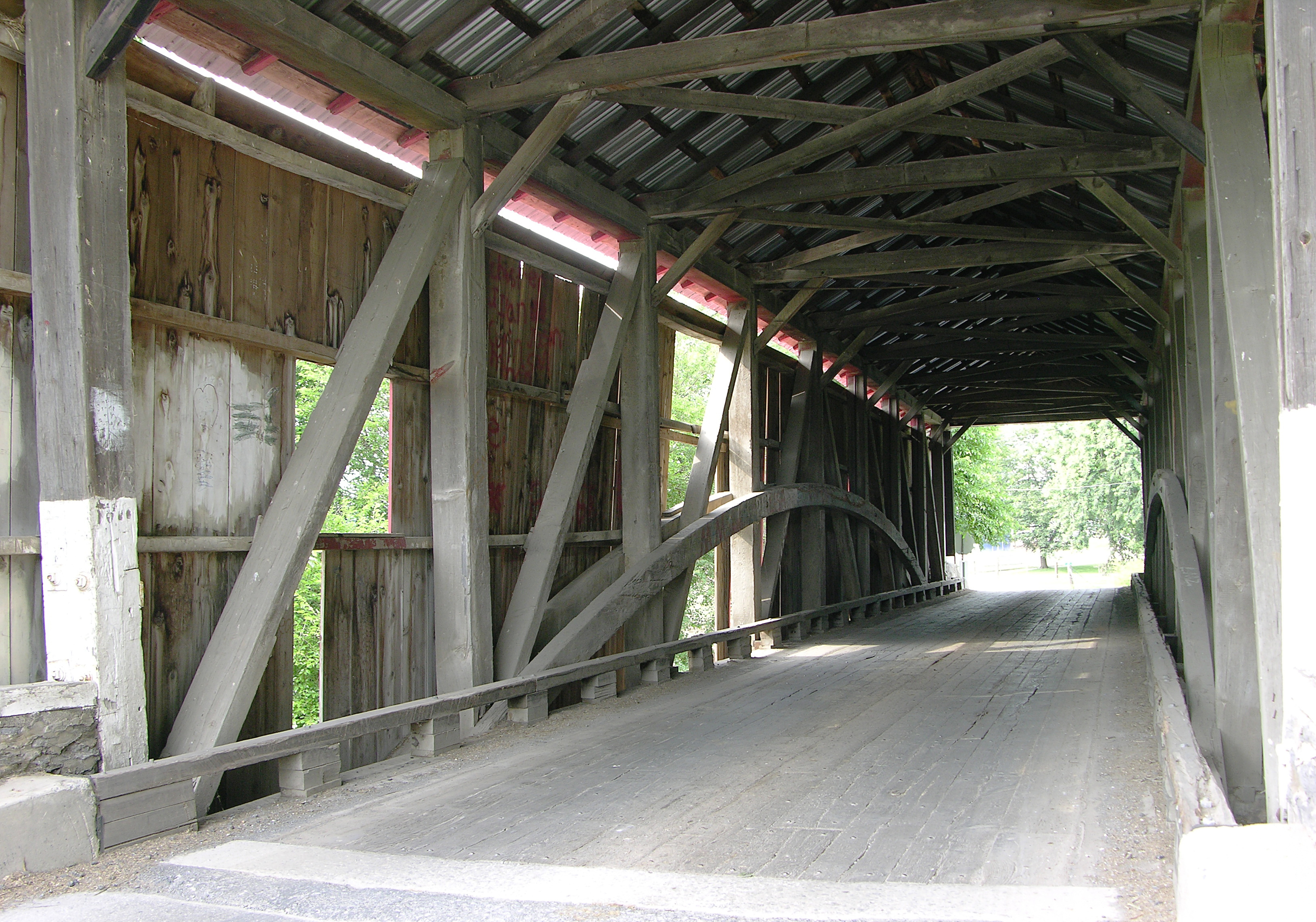
Inside of damaged west side (2006)

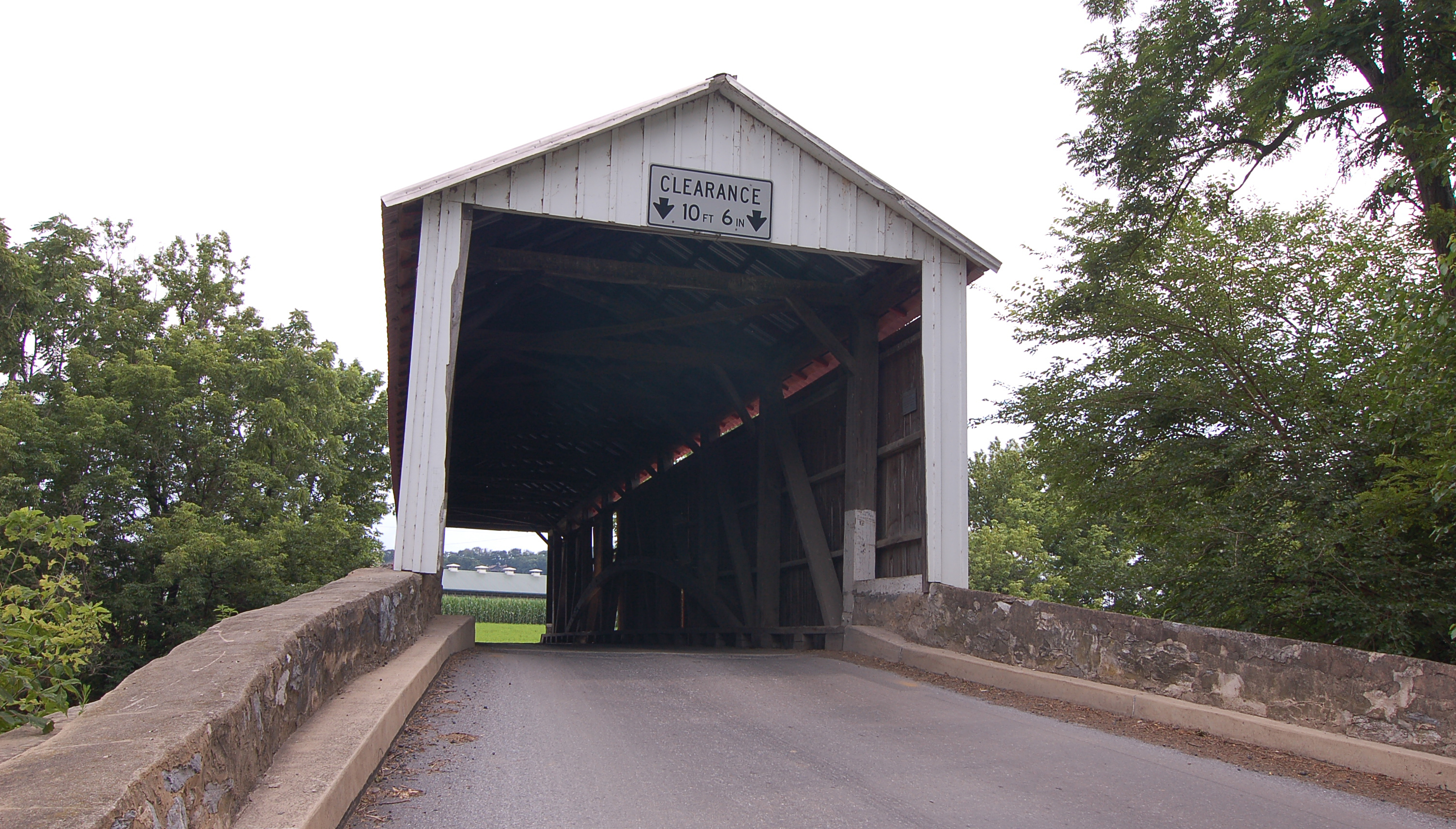
Looking south (2006)

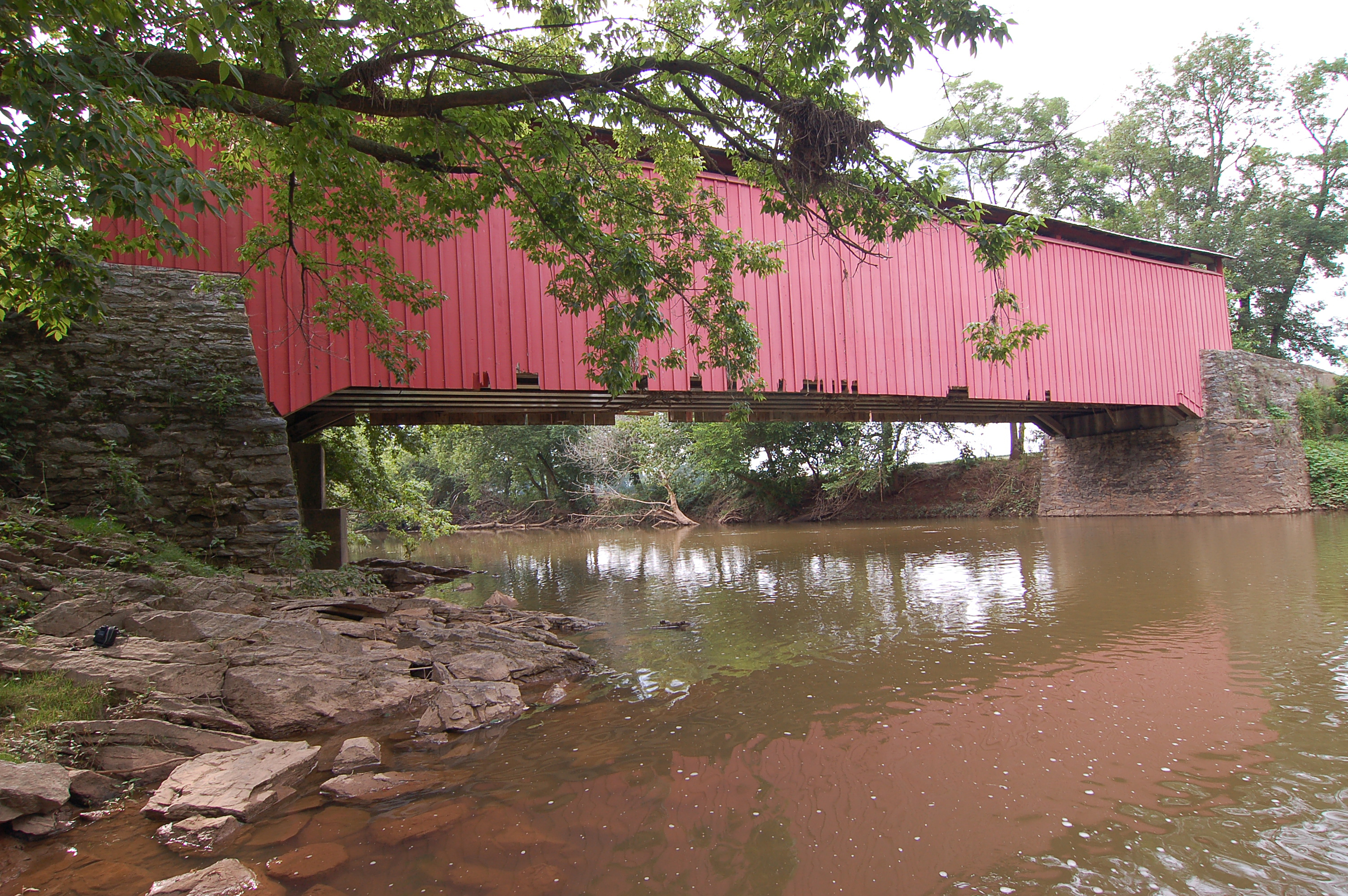
East side (2006)

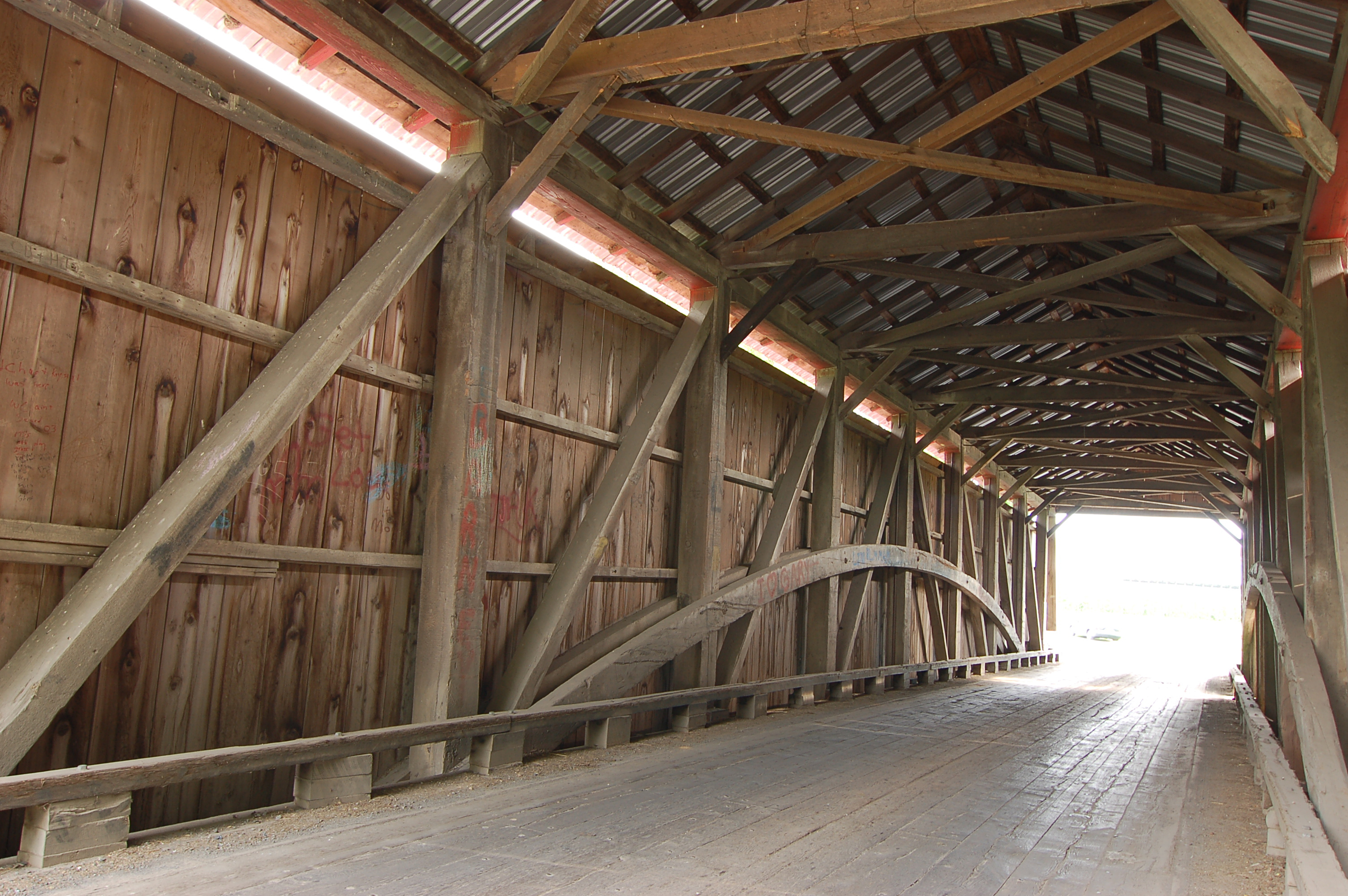
Inside of undamaged east side (2006)

== See also ==
- List of covered bridges on the National Register of Historic Places in Pennsylvania
- List of covered bridges in Lancaster County, Pennsylvania
- List of crossings of the Conestoga River
- National Register of Historic Places listings in Lancaster County, Pennsylvania
