= Upper Leacock Township, Pennsylvania =

Township in Pennsylvania, US

Coordinates: 40°05′00″N 76°09′59″W

- Township
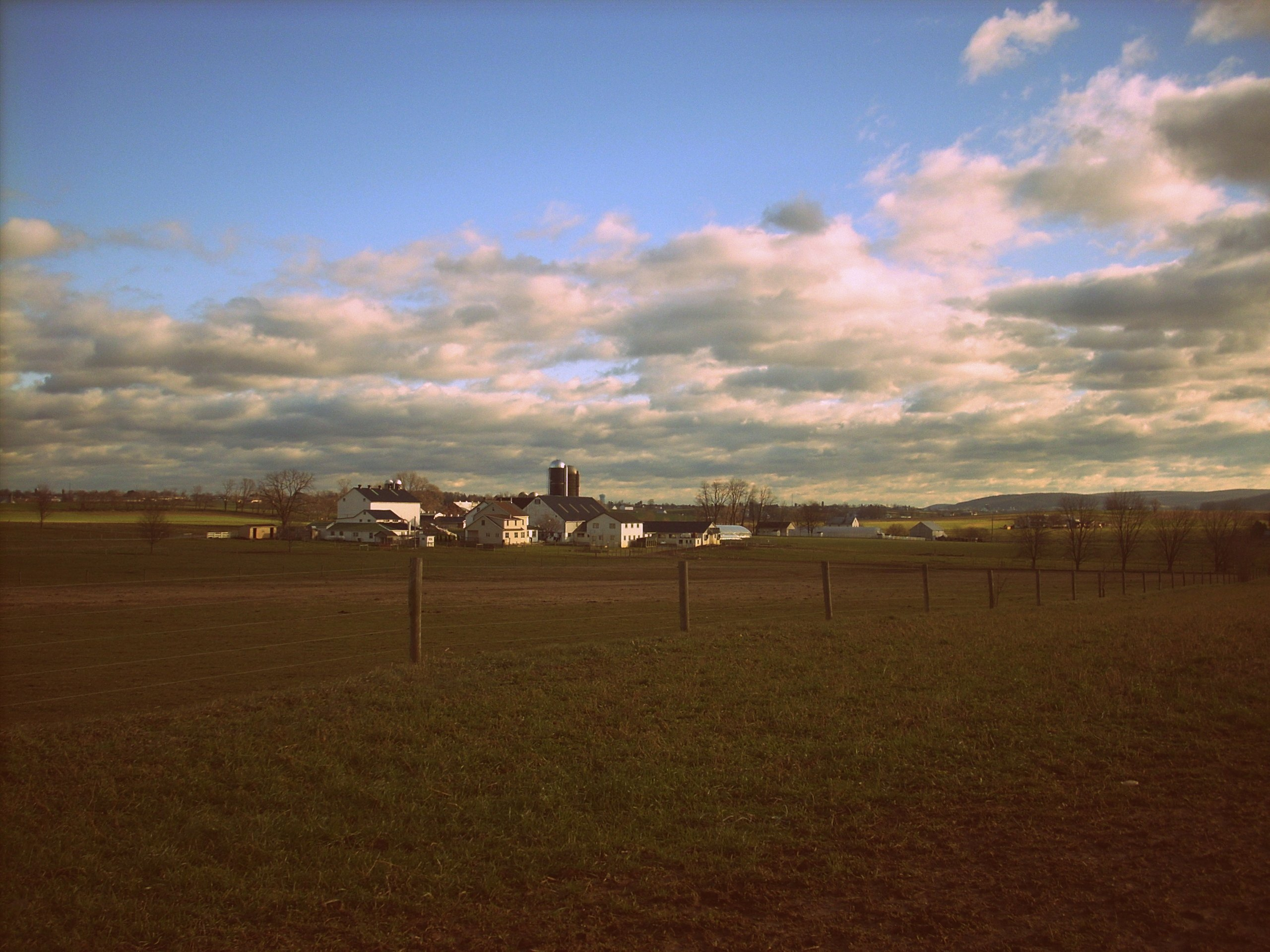
- A township vista

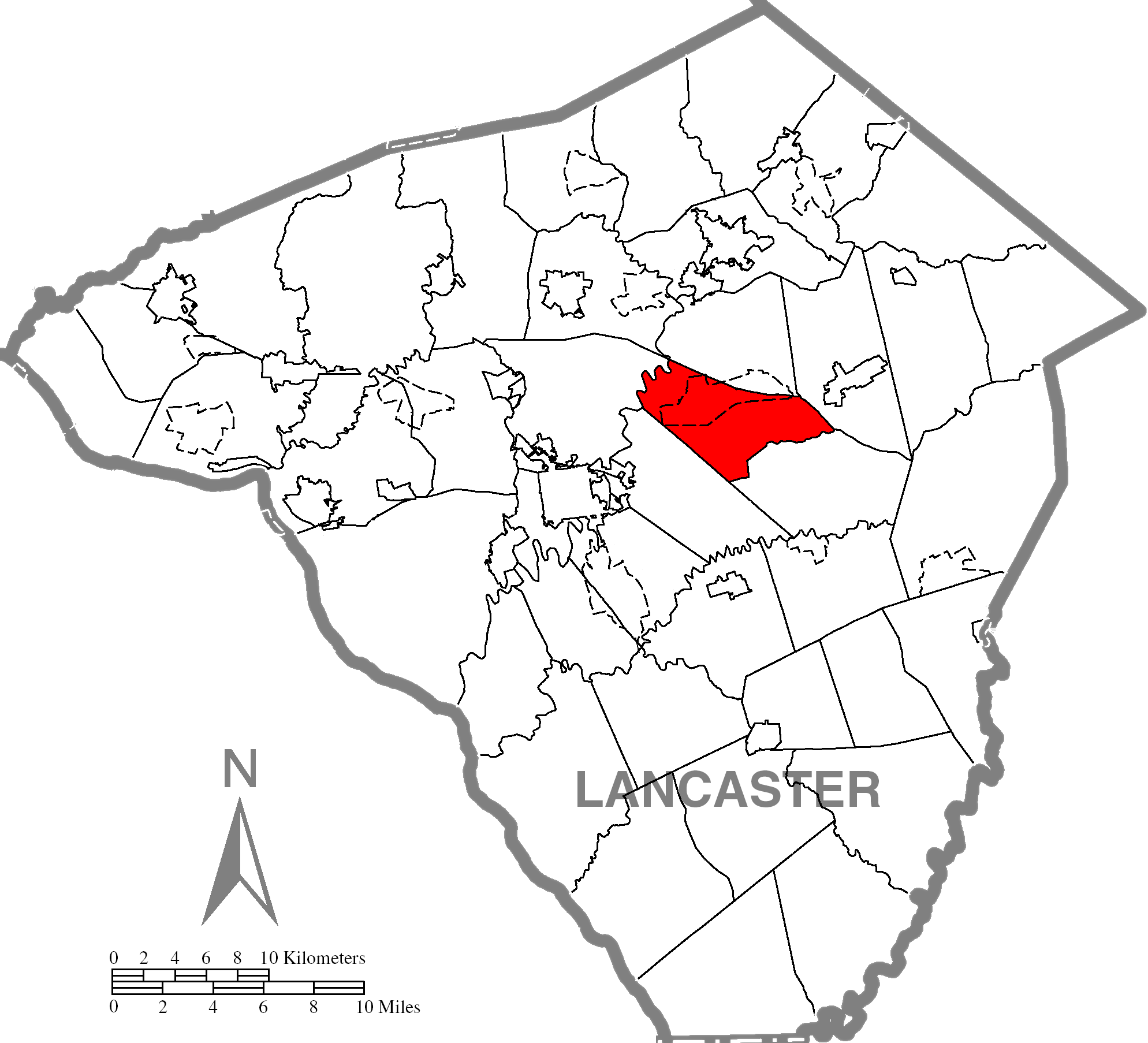
- Map of Lancaster County, Pennsylvania highlighting Upper Leacock Township

- Map of Lancaster County, Pennsylvania
- Country: United States
- State: Pennsylvania
- County: Lancaster
- Settled: 1731
- Incorporated: 1843

Government
  - Type: Board of Supervisors

Area
  - Total: 18.24 sq mi (47.25 km^{2})
  - Land: 18.12 sq mi (46.93 km^{2})
  - Water: 0.12 sq mi (0.32 km^{2})

Population (2020)
  - Total: 8,949 ▲
  - Estimate (2021): 8,933
  - Density: 490/sq mi (189.2/km^{2})
- Time zone: UTC-5 (Eastern (EST))
  - Summer (DST): UTC-4 (EDT)
- Area code: 717
- FIPS code: 42-071-79080
- Website: www.ultwp.com

Upper Leacock Township is a township in east central Lancaster County, Pennsylvania, United States. The population was 8,949 at the 2020 census.

The Mascot Roller Mills and Pinetown Covered Bridge are listed on the National Register of Historic Places.

== Geography ==
According to the United States Census Bureau, the township has a total area of 18.1 square miles (46.9 km^{2}), of which 18.0 square miles (46.6 km^{2}) are land and 0.1 square miles (0.2 km^{2}), or 0.50%, are water. Unincorporated communities in the township include Hunsecker, Leacock, Leola, Bareville, Groffdale, Monterey, Stumptown, and part of Mascot.

The village of Mascot was named by Annie Groff, a member of the Ressler family, owners of the Mascot Roller Mills. She dedicated the name of the village to a canine actor she had watched at a Broadway theatre show on her honeymoon. In 2005, the Lancaster Barnstormers baseball team introduced its mascot, Cylo, at the village's Mascot Roller Mills.

== Demographics ==
Historical population
Census	Pop.	Note	%±
2000	8,229		—
2010	8,708		5.8%
2020	8,949		2.8%
2021 (est.)	8,933		−0.2%
U.S. Decennial Census

As of the census of 2000, there were 8,229 people, 2,777 households, and 2,102 families residing in the township. The population density was 457.1 inhabitants per square mile (176.5/km^{2}). There were 2,854 housing units at an average density of 158.5 units per square mile (61.2 units/km^{2}). The racial makeup of the township was 92.34% White, 1.24% African American, 0.15% Native American, 3.71% Asian, 1.29% from other races, and 1.28% from two or more races. Hispanic or Latino of any race were 3.24% of the population.

There were 2,777 households, out of which 38.6% had children under the age of 18 living with them, 65.3% were married couples living together, 7.2% had a female householder with no husband present, and 24.3% were non-families. 19.9% of all households were made up of individuals, and 7.3% had someone living alone who was 65 years of age or older. The average household size was 2.96 and the average family size was 3.45.

In the township the population was spread out, with 31.6% under the age of 18, 9.6% from 18 to 24, 26.4% from 25 to 44, 20.9% from 45 to 64, and 11.5% who were 65 years of age or older. The median age was 32 years. For every 100 females, there were 98.1 males. For every 100 females age 18 and over, there were 96.1 males.

The median income for a household in the township was $45,403, and the median income for a family was $49,670. Males had a median income of $34,141 versus $22,309 for females. The per capita income for the township was $20,902. About 4.4% of families and 7.0% of the population were below the poverty line, including 10.9% of those under age 18 and 5.9% of those age 65 or over.
