= West Earl Township, Pennsylvania =

Township in Pennsylvania, US

Coordinates: 40°07′00″N 76°09′59″W

- Township
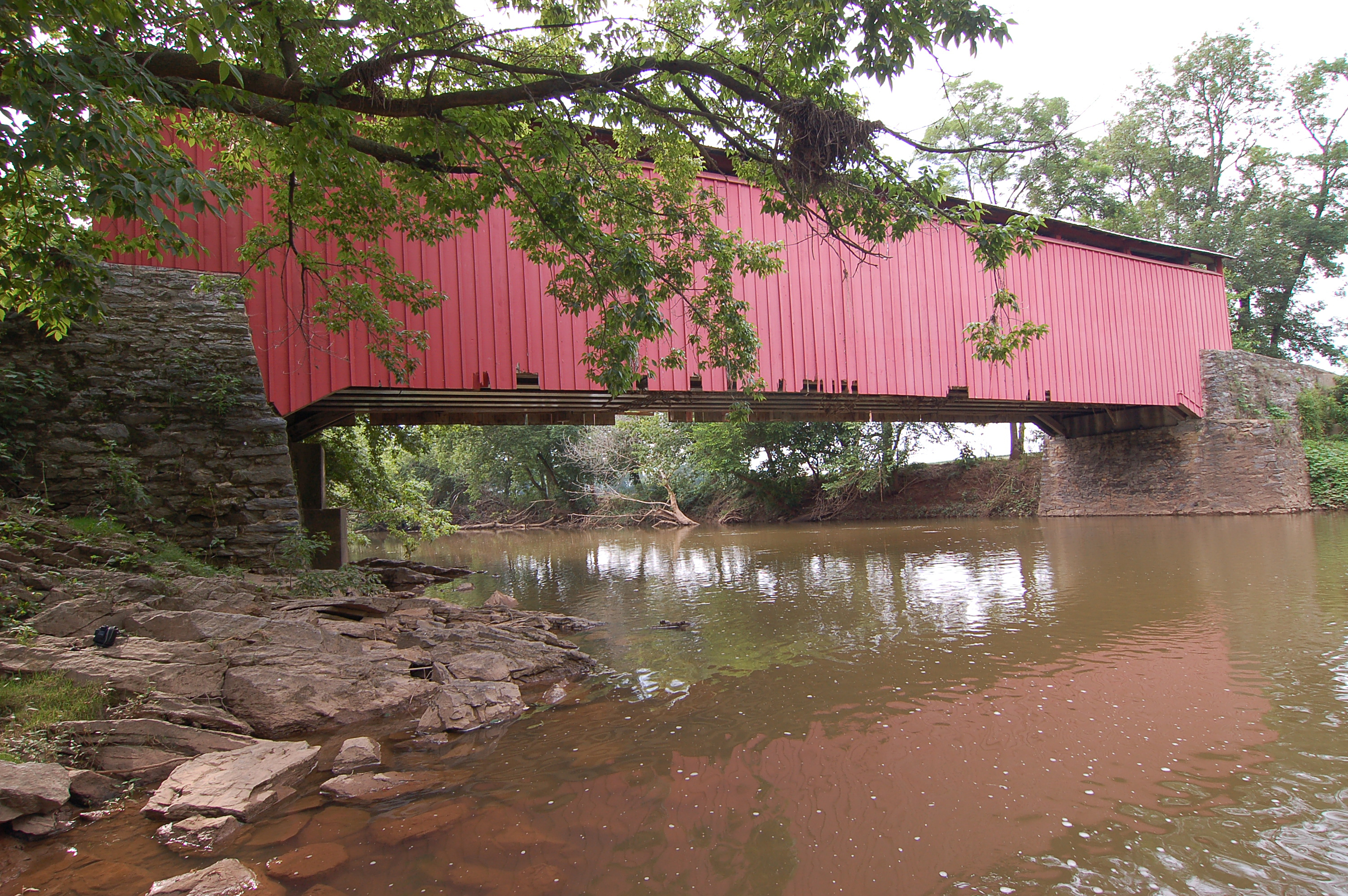
- Bitzer's Mill Covered Bridge in West Earl Township

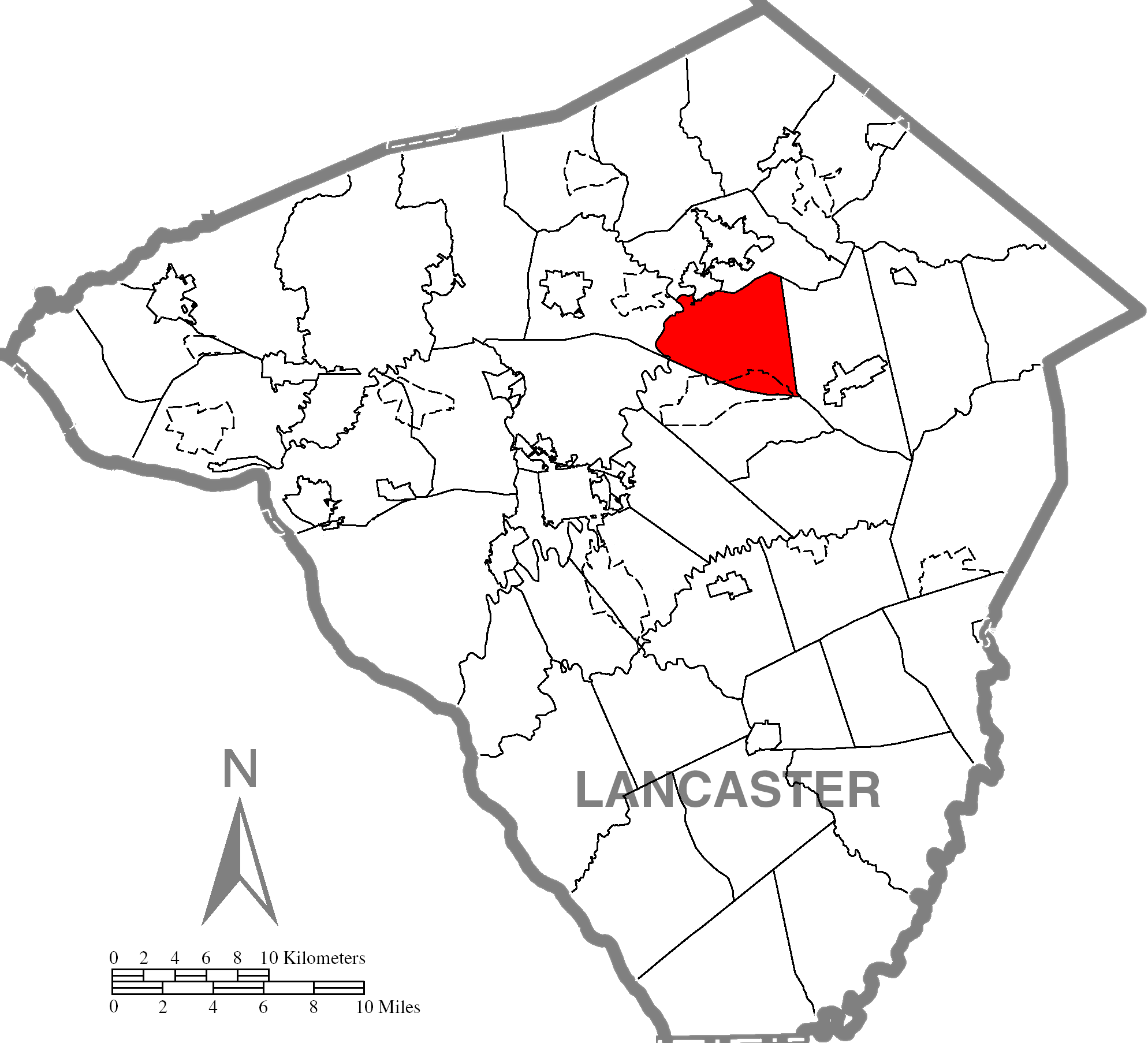
- Map of Lancaster County, Pennsylvania highlighting West Earl Township

- Map of Lancaster County, Pennsylvania
- Country: United States
- State: Pennsylvania
- County: Lancaster
- Settled: 1717
- Incorporated: 1833

Government
  - Type: Board of Supervisors

Area
  - Total: 17.94 sq mi (46.47 km^{2})
  - Land: 17.75 sq mi (45.97 km^{2})
  - Water: 0.19 sq mi (0.50 km^{2})

Population (2020)
  - Total: 8,565 ▲
  - Estimate (2021): 8,513
  - Density: 467.5/sq mi (180.51/km^{2})
- Time zone: UTC-5 (Eastern (EST))
  - Summer (DST): UTC-4 (EDT)
- FIPS code: 42-071-82824
- Website: www.westearltwp.org

West Earl Township is a township in northeastern Lancaster County, Pennsylvania, United States. The population was 8,565 at the 2020 census. The township was founded by its first settler, Hans Conrad Groff (1661-1746) in 1717.

== History ==
The Bridge in West Earl Township, Bitzer's Mill Covered Bridge, and Zook's Mill Covered Bridge are listed on the National Register of Historic Places.

== First settler ==
Hans Conrad Groff, originally from Bäretswil in Zurich, Switzerland immigrated to Pennsylvania Colony in 1695, settling in Germantown before making his way to Lancaster County in 1696. He was West Earl Township's first settler and founder, in 1717.

Upon having relocated to West Earl Township, Groff established his farm in Groffdale and constructed the first mill in the area, with the community beginning to flourish as a result. His brother, Martin Groff (1685-1759) was the township's first ever constable.

Groffdale Church was built years following Groff's death in 1755, and would become an important area of congregation for the area's Mennonites.

== Geography ==
According to the United States Census Bureau, the township has a total area of 18.0 square miles (46.6 km^{2}), of which 17.6 square miles (45.7 km^{2}) are land and 0.3 square miles (0.9 km^{2}), or 2.00%, are water. The township includes the unincorporated communities of Fairmount, Farmersville, Brownstown, Talmage, Leola, and Center Square.

== Notable person ==
Floyd Landis, winner of the 2006 Tour de France, is from Farmersville in the township. Landis left such a mark on the Tour de France that when a contending rider completes a seemingly impossible long-distance attack it is referred to as "Doing a Landis", as Chris Froome did on Stage 19 of the 2018 Giro d'Italia.

== Demographics ==
Historical population
Census	Pop.	Note	%±
2000	6,766		—
2010	7,868		16.3%
2020	8,565		8.9%
2021 (est.)	8,513		−0.6%
U.S. Decennial Census

As of the census of 2000, there were 6,766 people, 2,201 households, and 1,785 families residing in the township. The population density was 383.5 inhabitants per square mile (148.1/km^{2}). There were 2,283 housing units at an average density of 129.4 per square mile (50.0/km^{2}). The racial makeup of the township was 96.63% White, 0.35% African American, 0.06% Native American, 2.13% Asian, 0.47% from other races, and 0.35% from two or more races. Hispanic or Latino of any race were 1.51% of the population.

There were 2,201 households, out of which 37.9% had children under the age of 18 living with them, 71.7% were married couples living together, 6.8% had a female householder with no husband present, and 18.9% were non-families. 15.9% of all households were made up of individuals, and 8.2% had someone living alone who was 65 years of age or older. The average household size was 2.98 and the average family size was 3.36.

In the township the population was spread out, with 28.7% under the age of 18, 8.6% from 18 to 24, 25.0% from 25 to 44, 23.3% from 45 to 64, and 14.4% who were 65 years of age or older. The median age was 36 years. For every 100 females, there were 95.5 males. For every 100 females age 18 and over, there were 91.1 males.

The median income for a household in the township was $51,503, and the median income for a family was $54,360. Males had a median income of $37,227 versus $22,037 for females. The per capita income for the township was $21,457. About 5.1% of families and 8.4% of the population were below the poverty line, including 9.9% of those under age 18 and 9.8% of those age 65 or over.

== Education ==
The township is served by the Conestoga Valley School District.

== See also ==
- Bridge in West Earl Township
