= Leola, Pennsylvania =

Unincorporated community in Pennsylvania, US

- Census-designated place
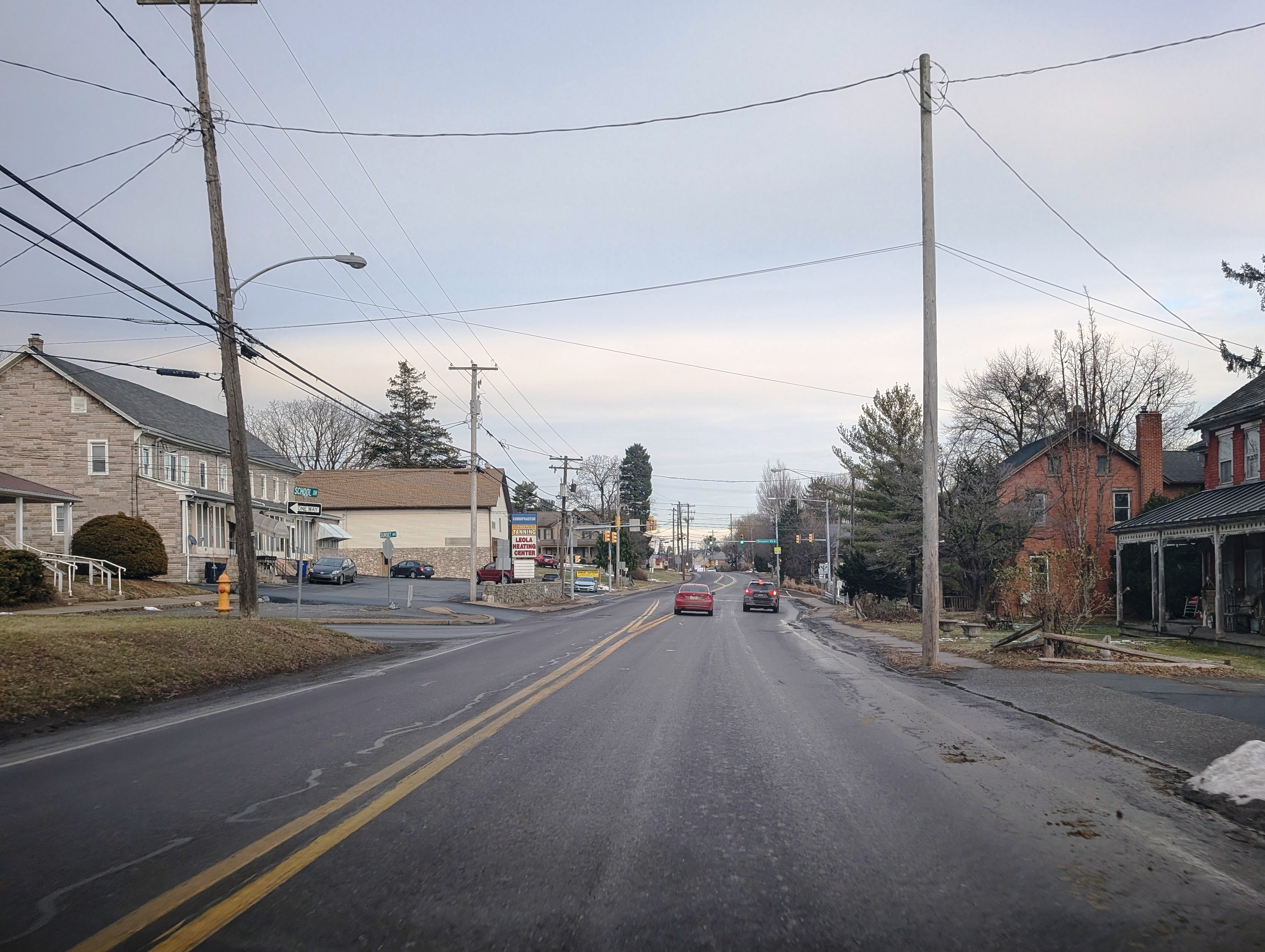
- PA 23/PA 772 (Main Street) in Leola

- Location within Pennsylvania Location within the United States
- Coordinates: 40°05′16″N 76°11′06″W
- Country: United States
- State: Pennsylvania
- County: Lancaster
- Townships: Upper Leacock, West Earl

Area
  - Total: 6.02 sq mi (15.58 km^{2})
  - Land: 6.01 sq mi (15.56 km^{2})
  - Water: 0.0077 sq mi (0.02 km^{2})
- Elevation: 430 ft (130 m)

Population (2020)
  - Total: 7,465
  - Density: 1,242.6/sq mi (479.76/km^{2})
- Time zone: UTC-5 (Eastern (EST))
  - Summer (DST): UTC-4 (EDT)
- ZIP code: 17540
- Area code: 717
- FIPS code: 42-42776
- GNIS feature ID: 2390047

Leola is a census-designated place (CDP) in Lancaster County, Pennsylvania, United States. It includes the unincorporated communities of Leola, Leacock, and Bareville, and prior to 2010 was known as the Leacock-Leola-Bareville census-designated place. Originally named "Mechanicsburg", its present name is a portmanteau of "Leacock" and the "Glenola" train station that once served the town. As of the 2010 census, the population of the CDP was 7,214.

== Demographics ==
Historical population
Census	Pop.	Note	%±
2020	7,465		—
U.S. Decennial Census

== Geography and climate ==
Leola is in central Lancaster County, primarily in Upper Leacock Township, and extending east into the southern corner of West Earl Township. The community of Leacock is in the western part of the CDP, Leola is in the center, and Bareville is in the east. The small community of Groffdale is in the easternmost part of the CDP. New Holland Pike (Pennsylvania Route 23) runs the length of the community, leading west 8 miles (13 km) to the city of Lancaster, the county seat, and east 5 miles (8 km) to the borough of New Holland.

According to the U.S. Census Bureau, the Leola CDP has a total area of 6.0 square miles (15.6 km^{2}), of which 0.01 square miles (0.02 km^{2}), or 0.14%, are water. The communities lie atop a low east–west trending ridge, draining north via tributaries of Groff Creek to the Conestoga River and draining south to Mill Creek, a westward-flowing tributary of the Conestoga, which leads to the Susquehanna.

Leola has a hot-summer humid continental climate (Dfa), and average monthly temperatures range from 30.3 °F (−0.9 °C) in January to 74.8 °F (23.8 °C) in July. The local hardiness zone is 6b.
