= List of crossings of the Conestoga River =

This is a list of bridges and other crossings of the Conestoga River, from the Susquehanna River upstream to the source. All locations are in Pennsylvania.

== Crossings ==
Crossing	Carries	Location	Coordinates	Notes
=== Lancaster County ===
Port Road Bridge	Rail bridge	Safe Harbor	39°55′30″N 76°23′04″W	Former Port Road Branch of Columbia and Port Deposit Railroad
Safe Harbor Trestle	Rail bridge	Safe Harbor	39°55′31″N 76°23′03″W	Former Enola Low Grade Line (Atglen and Susquehanna Railroad)
Bridge	Powerhouse Road	Safe Harbor	39°55′32″N 76°23′04″W	Safe Harbor Dam access road
Bridge	River Road	Safe Harbor	39°56′32″N 76°23′14″W	
Bridge	Rock Hill Road	Rockhill	39°57′42″N 76°21′56″W	
Bridge	Slackwater Road	Millersville	39°59′02″N 76°21′25″W	
Bridge	PA 741 (Millersville Road)	Millersville	40°00′03″N 76°19′41″W	
Bridge	PA 324 (New Danville Pike)	Willow Street	39°59′49″N 76°18′41″W	
Bridge	US 222 south / PA 272 south (Willow Street Pike)	Lancaster	40°01′18″N 76°18′15″W	
Bridge	US 222 north / PA 272 north (Willow Street Pike)	Lancaster	40°01′16″N 76°18′09″W	
Bridge	East Strawberry Street	Lancaster	40°01′42″N 76°17′51″W	
Bridge	South Duke Street	Lancaster	40°01′25″N 76°17′02″W	
Bridge	Circle Avenue	Lancaster	40°01′57″N 76°17′13″W	
Bridge	PA 462 (Lincoln Highway)	Lancaster	40°02′16″N 76°16′24″W	
Conestoga Creek Viaduct	Amtrak Keystone Corridor	Lancaster	40°03′00″N 76°16′41″W	Former Pennsylvania Railroad main line
Bridge	PA 23 (East Walnut Street)	Lancaster	40°03′13″N 76°16′20″W	
Bridge	US 30 / PA 23	Lancaster	40°03′28″N 76°16′23″W	Lancaster bypass
Bridge	Golf cart path	Between Manheim Township and East Lampeter Township	40°03′37″N 76°16′05″W	On the grounds of Lancaster Country Club
Bridge	Golf cart path	Between Manheim Township and East Lampeter Township	40°03′42″N 76°16′00″W	On the grounds of Lancaster Country Club
Bridge	Milcross Road	Between Manheim Township and East Lampeter Township	40°04′15″N 76°15′46″W	
Bridge	PA 23 (New Holland Pike)	Between Manheim Township and East Lampeter Township	40°04′39″N 76°15′33″W	
Hunsecker's Mill Covered Bridge	Hunsecker Road	Upper Leacock Township	40°05′14″N 76°14′51″W	
Pinetown Bushong's Mill Covered Bridge	SR 1014 (Bushong Road)	Upper Leacock Township	40°06′19″N 76°14′53″W	Big Conestoga Bridge No. 6
Bridge	Bushong Road	Upper Leacock Township	40°06′19″N 76°14′16″W	
Bridge	PA 772 (South State Street)	Brownstown	40°07′14″N 76°12′49″W	
Bridge in West Earl Township	SR 1010 (Farmersville Road)	Brownstown	40°07′40″N 76°11′59″W	Big Conestoga Bridge No. 12
Bridge	North Farmersville Road	West Earl Township	40°08′06″N 76°10′26″W	
Bitzer's Mill Covered Bridge	SR 1013	West Earl Township	40°08′26″N 76°09′07″W	Big Conestoga Bridge No. 2
Bridge	US 322 (Division Highway)	West Earl Township	40°09′12″N 76°07′40″W	
Bridge	Kurtz Road	Earl Township	40°09′02″N 76°06′14″W	
Bridge	Gristmill Road	Earl Township	40°08′58″N 76°05′25″W	
Bridge	White Oak Road	Earl Township	40°08′45″N 76°04′40″W	
Weaverland Bridge	Quarry Road	East Earl Township	40°08′16″N 76°03′34″W	Designed by Frank H. Shaw, built 1916
Bridge	Linden Road	East Earl Township	40°08′24″N 76°02′53″W	
Bridge	PA 897 (Weaverland Valley Road)	East Earl Township	40°08′20″N 76°02′47″W	
Bridge	Conestoga Creek Road	East Earl Township	40°08′25″N 76°02′27″W	
Bridge	PA 625 (Reading Road)	East Earl Township	40°08′31″N 76°01′53″W	
Bridge	SR 1021 (Spring Grove Road)	East Earl Township	40°08′38″N 76°01′14″W	
Bridge	Iron Bridge Road	East Earl Township	40°08′41″N 76°00′37″W	
Weaver's Mill Covered Bridge	Weaverland Road	East Earl Township	40°08′28″N 75°59′52″W	
Pool Forge Covered Bridge		East Earl Township	40°07′47″N 75°58′37″W	
