= Hunsecker, Pennsylvania =

Unincorporated community in Pennsylvania, US

- Unincorporated community
- Location within Pennsylvania Location within the United States
- Coordinates: 40°5′8″N 76°14′39″W
- Country: United States
- State: Pennsylvania
- County: Lancaster
- Township: Upper Leacock
- Elevation: 312 ft (95 m)
- Time zone: UTC-5 (Eastern (EST))
  - Summer (DST): UTC-4 (EDT)
- GNIS feature ID: 1203859

Hunsecker is an unincorporated community located in Upper Leacock Township, Lancaster County, Pennsylvania, United States, at latitude 40.08556 and longitude -76.24444. The elevation is 308 feet. Hunsecker appears on the Leola U.S. Geological Survey Map and is part of the Lower Susquehanna watershed. Lancaster County is in the Eastern time zone (UTC−5). Hunsecker is located at the vicinity of the intersection of Hunsecker Road (SR 1029, also listed as Hunsicker Road) with Mondale Road, just north of New Holland Pike, east of Holland Heights, and west of Leacock. Nearby is Hunsecker's Mill Covered Bridge, spanning the Conestoga River.
