= Safe Harbor Bridge =

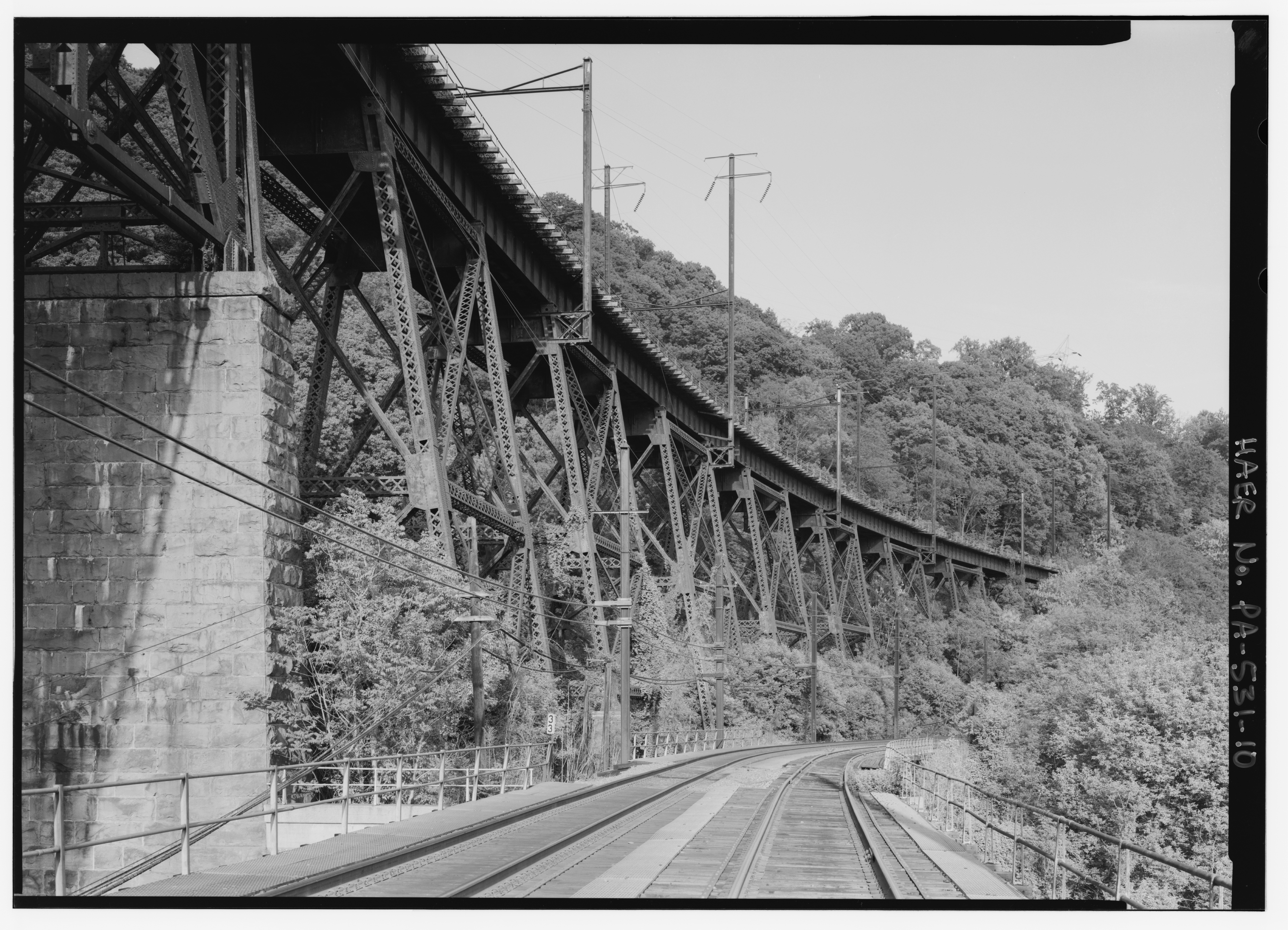
- Coordinates: 39°55′31″N 76°23′03″W
- Carries: Rail
- Crosses: Conestoga River
- Locale: Conestoga Township, Lancaster County, Pennsylvania
- Owner: Norfolk Southern Railway

Characteristics
- Design: Lower: Deck girder. Upper: Pratt truss.
- Material: Steel
- Total length: Lower: 295 feet (90 m). Upper: 300 feet (91 m).
- Height: 55 feet (17 m); 92 feet (28 m) (between lower & upper bridge)

History
- Designer: William H. Brown (PRR)
- Constructed by: H.S. Kerbaugh, Inc.
- Fabrication by: Pennsylvania Steel Company
- Construction end: 1905
- Opened: 1906
- Rebuilt: 1930

The Safe Harbor Bridge also known as the Safe Harbor Trestle, Port Road Bridge and the Enola Low Grade Line (A&S Railroad) Steel Trestle is a steel deck truss trestle that spans the Conestoga River at Safe Harbor, Pennsylvania near the Susquehanna River for the Port Road Branch and the former Columbia and Port Deposit Railroad along the Susquehanna River.

== History and notable features ==
This bridge was built in 1905 for the Atglen and Susquehanna Branch (A&S), also known as the "Low Grade Branch", of the Pennsylvania Railroad (PRR).

There is one more bridge at this site, the Safe Harbor Dam access road bridge. The lower span was raised 4 feet (1.2 m) in 1930, concurrent with the construction of the Safe Harbor Dam. In 1976 the PRR lines became part of Conrail, which abandoned the A&S branch in 1989. The tracks were removed from the upper bridge in 1990. The upper portion has been repurposed to serve as part of the Enola Low Grade Trail.

== See also ==
- List of bridges documented by the Historic American Engineering Record in Pennsylvania
- List of crossings of the Conestoga River
