= Weaverland Bridge =

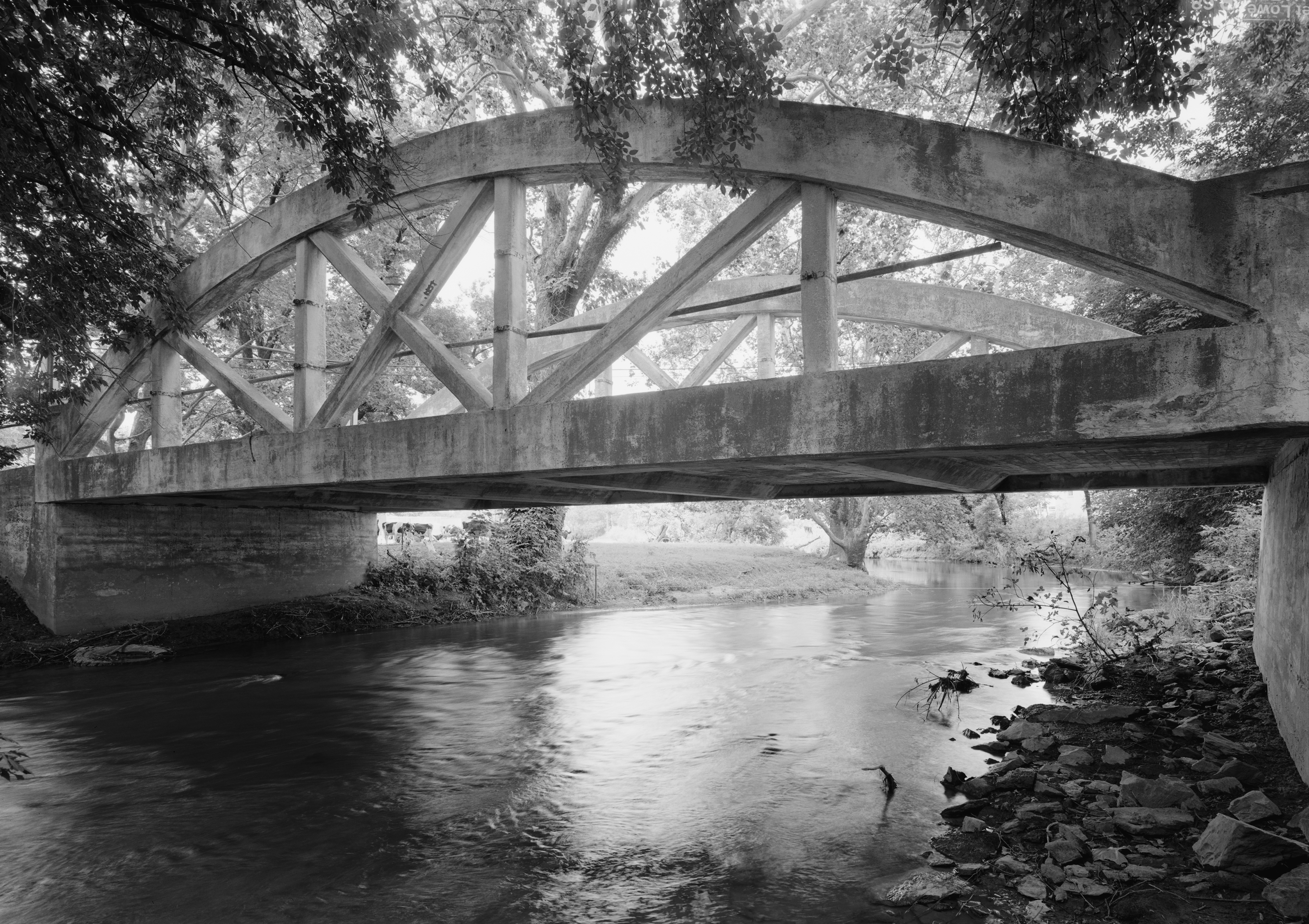
- Weaverland Bridge in 2003.
- Coordinates: 40°8′16″N 76°3′34″W
- Carries: Quarry Road (Township Route 894)
- Crosses: Conestoga River
- Locale: Terre Hill, Pennsylvania
- Maintained by: East Earl Township

Characteristics
- Design: Bowstring arch truss
- Material: Concrete
- Total length: 58.8 feet (17.9 m)
- Width: 19.8 feet (6.0 m)
- Longest span: 58.8 feet (17.9 m)
- No. of spans: 1

History
- Designer: Frank H. Shaw
- Constructed by: John T. Brubaker
- Opened: 1916

Location
- Interactive map of Weaverland Bridge

Weaverland Bridge carries Quarry Road (Township Route 894) across the Conestoga River near Terre Hill, East Earl Township, Lancaster County, Pennsylvania, in the United States. The bridge is notable for its form, a concrete bowstring arch truss. Designer Frank H. Shaw was a consulting engineer to Lancaster County when the bridge was constructed in 1916. Weaverland Bridge was determined to be eligible for the National Register of Historic Places in 1993.

== See also ==
- List of bridges documented by the Historic American Engineering Record in Pennsylvania
- List of crossings of the Conestoga River
