= Hunsecker's Mill Covered Bridge =

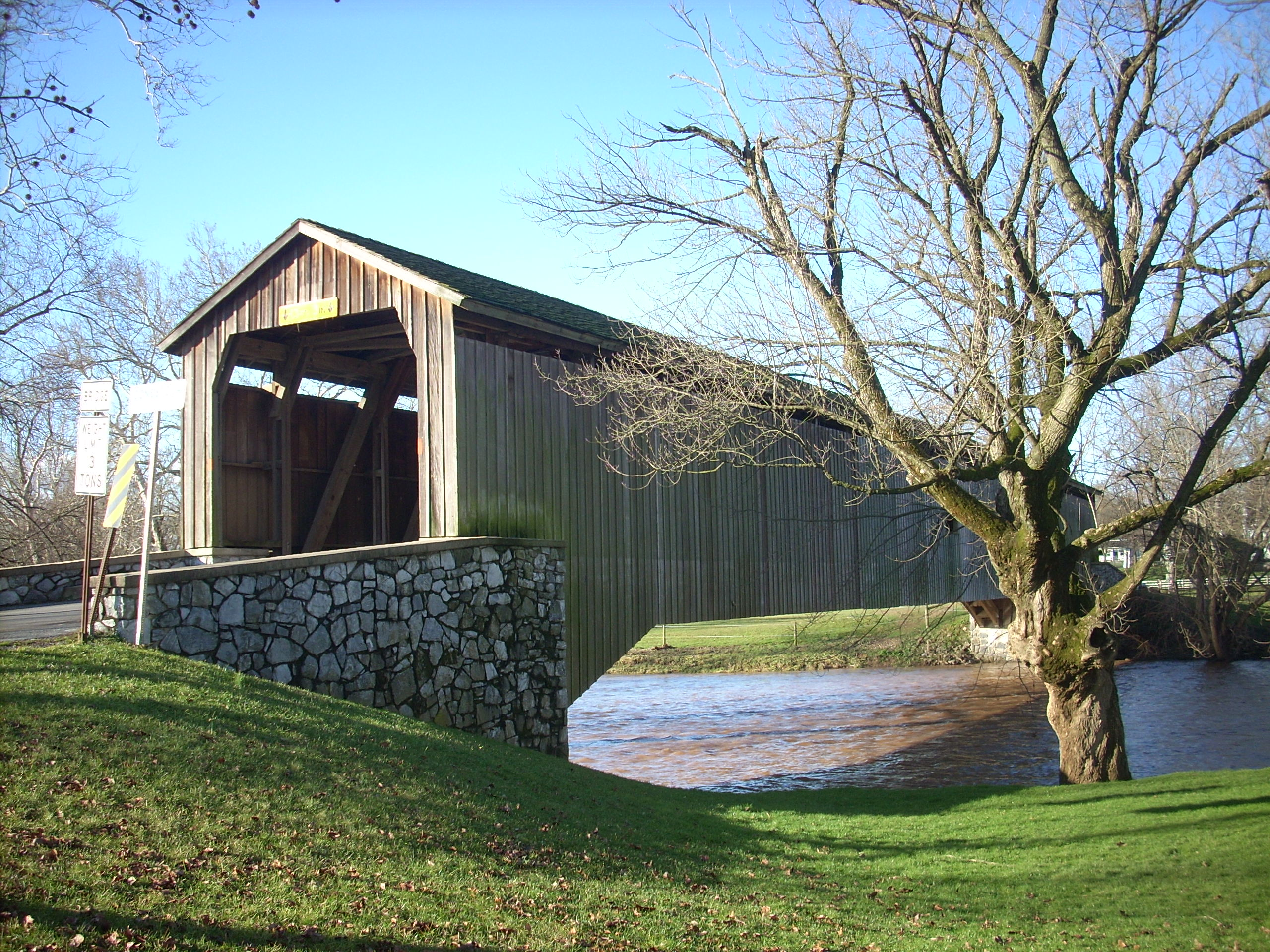
- Coordinates: 40.0872°N 76.2475°W
- Locale: Lancaster County, Pennsylvania, United States

Characteristics
- Design: single span, double Burr arch truss
- Total length: 180 feet (54.9 m)

History
- Constructed by: John Russell
- Construction start: 1843

Location
- Interactive map of Hunsecker's Mill Covered Bridge

The Hunsecker's Mill Covered Bridge is a covered bridge located in Lancaster County, Pennsylvania, United States. The bridge has a single span, wooden, double Burr arch trusses design. The bridge, which spans the Conestoga River, is 180 feet (55 m) long, making it the longest single span covered bridge in the county.

The bridge's WGCB Number is 38-36-06. Unlike most historic covered bridges in the county, it is not listed on the National Register of Historic Places. It is located at 40°5′13.8″N 76°14′51″W (40.08717, -76.24750). The bridge is approximately one mile southeast of Pennsylvania Route 272 and is 0.5 miles (0.80 km) north of Pennsylvania Route 23 off Mondale Road on Hunsecker Road, just west of the community of Hunsecker. The bridge divides the road on which it is upon into Hunsecker Road (East) in Upper Leacock Township and Hunsicker Road (West) in Manheim Township.

== History ==
The original bridge was built in 1843 by John Russell at a cost of $1,988. It was and is a double Burr Arch truss system. It has been swept away in flooding numerous times, most recently in 1972 after Hurricane Agnes. Waters lifted the original structure off its abutments and carried it downstream. In 1973, following destruction from the hurricane, it was rebuilt at a cost of $321,302.^{Note:} Its length of 180 feet makes it the longest single-span covered bridge of Lancaster County's 28 covered bridges. While Schenck's covered bridge (Big Chiques #4) is one of 3 bridges with horizontal siding boards, the Hunsecker's Mill bridge may be the only one in Lancaster County with horizontal floor boards which give a unique vibration upon crossing, it is a little bumpy for cyclists at speed, proceed with some caution. A detailed scale model (~7' long), complete with stone abutments, was donated to the Lancaster Mennonite Historical Society and may be available for viewing.

== Dimensions ==
- Length: 180 feet (55 m) total length
- Width: 15 feet (4.6 m) total width
- Overhead clearance: 13 feet 10 inches (4.22 m)

== Gallery ==
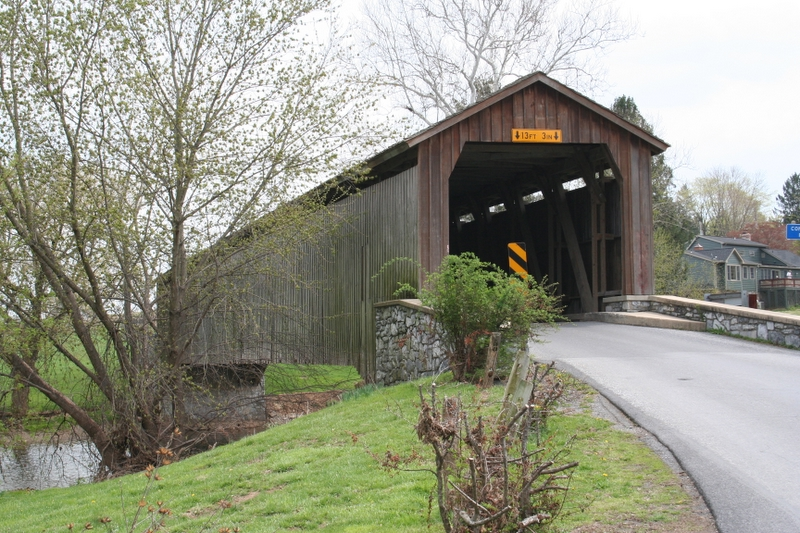
A three-quarters view of the bridge

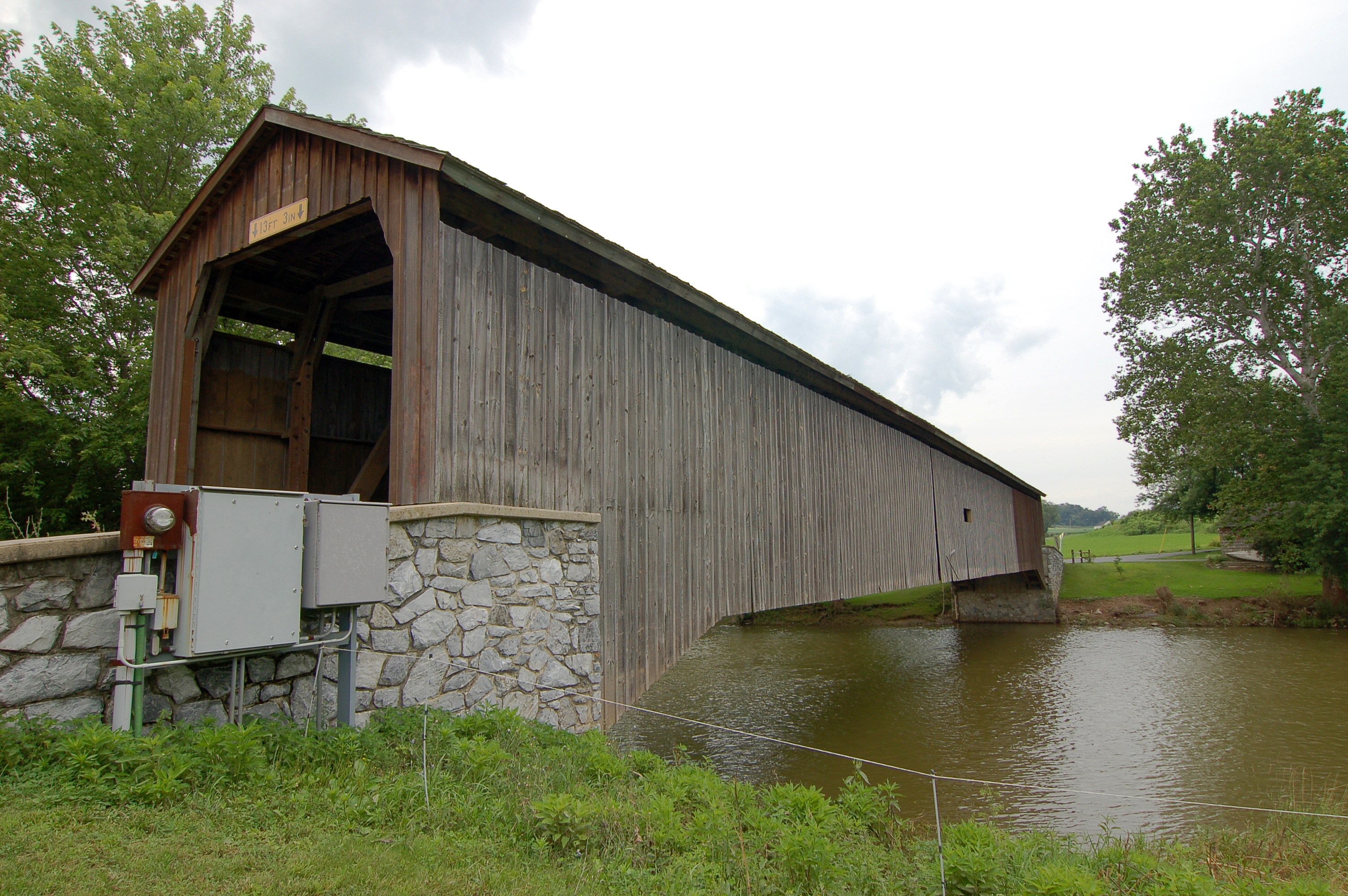
Another view from a different angle

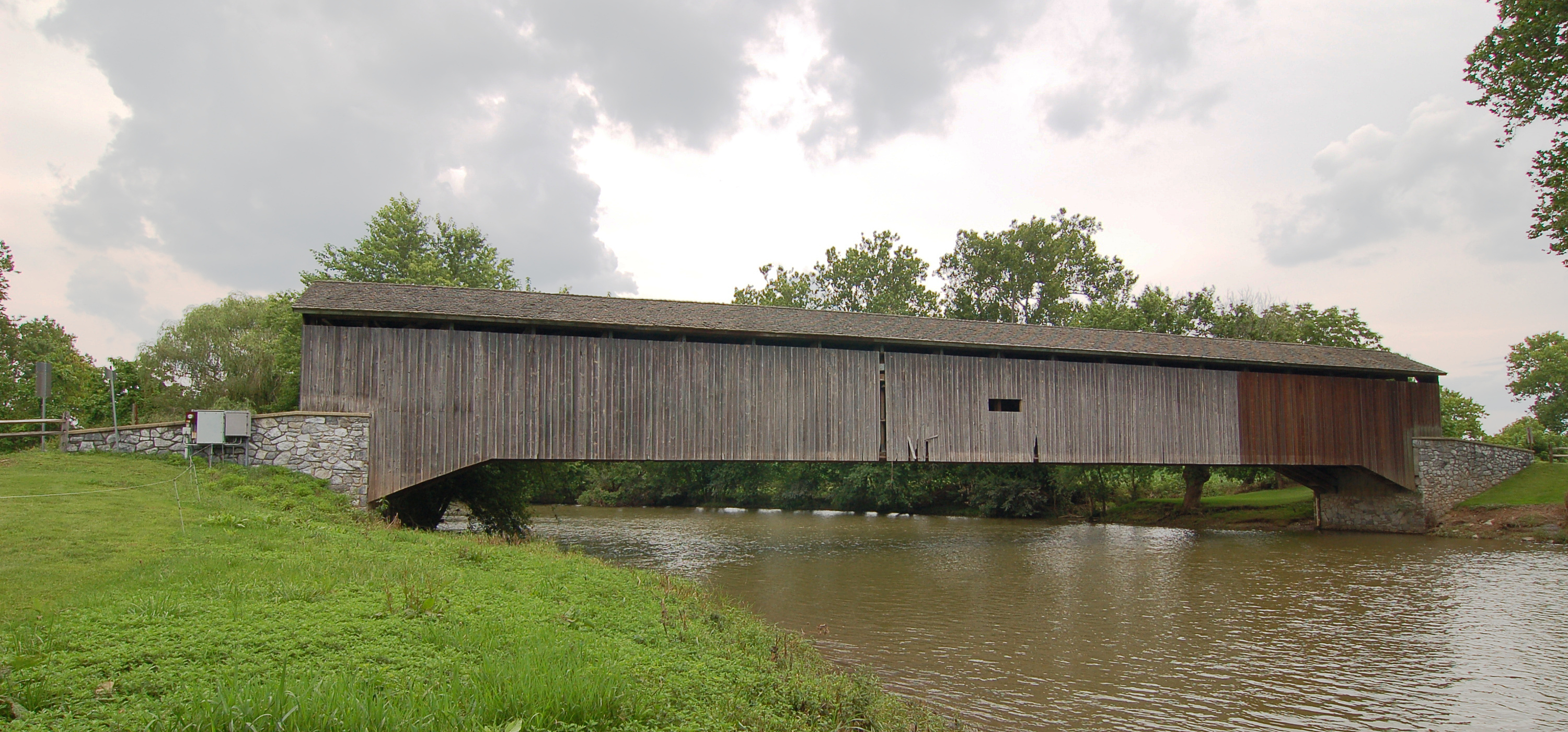
A side view

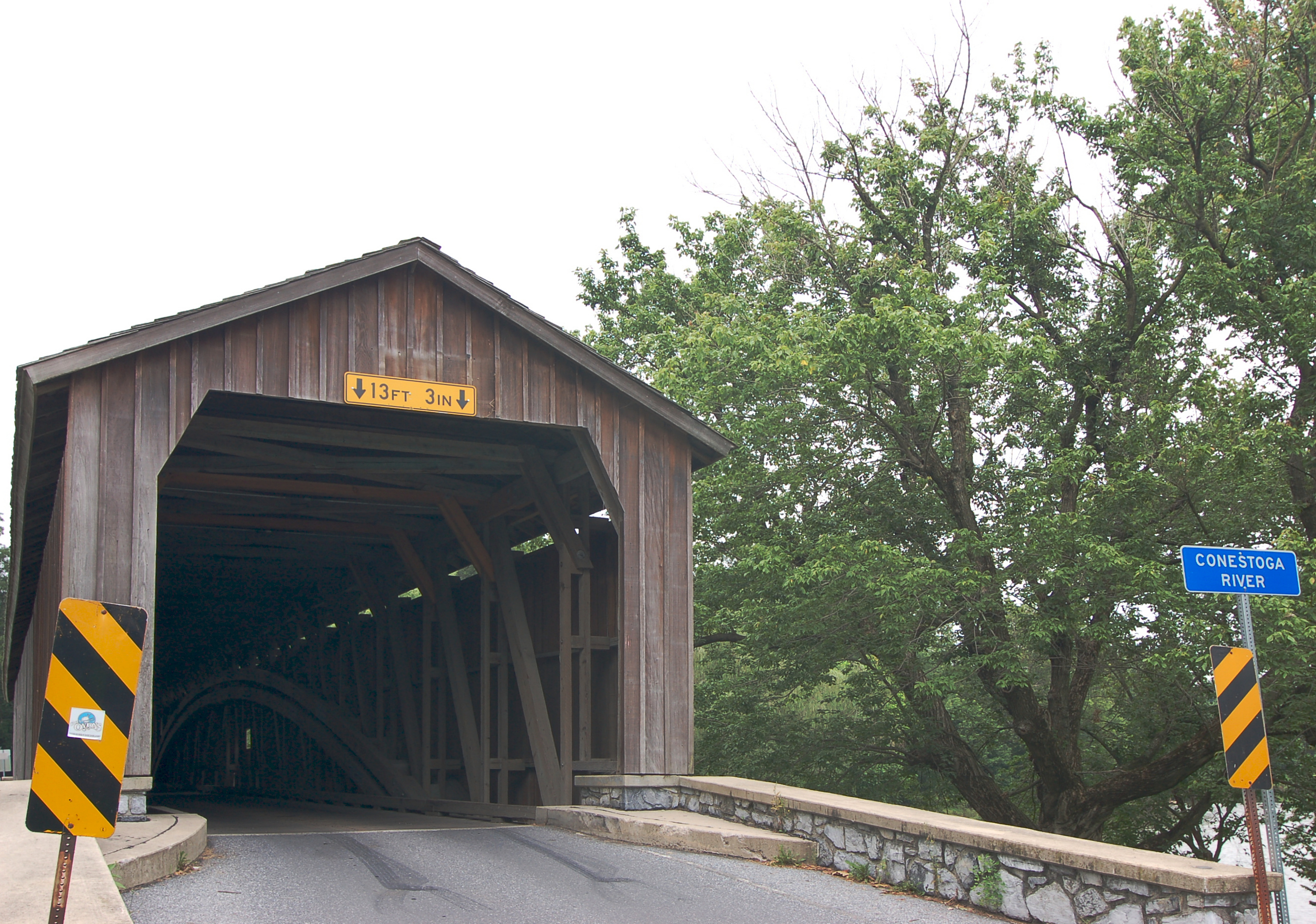
The approach to the bridge from the east

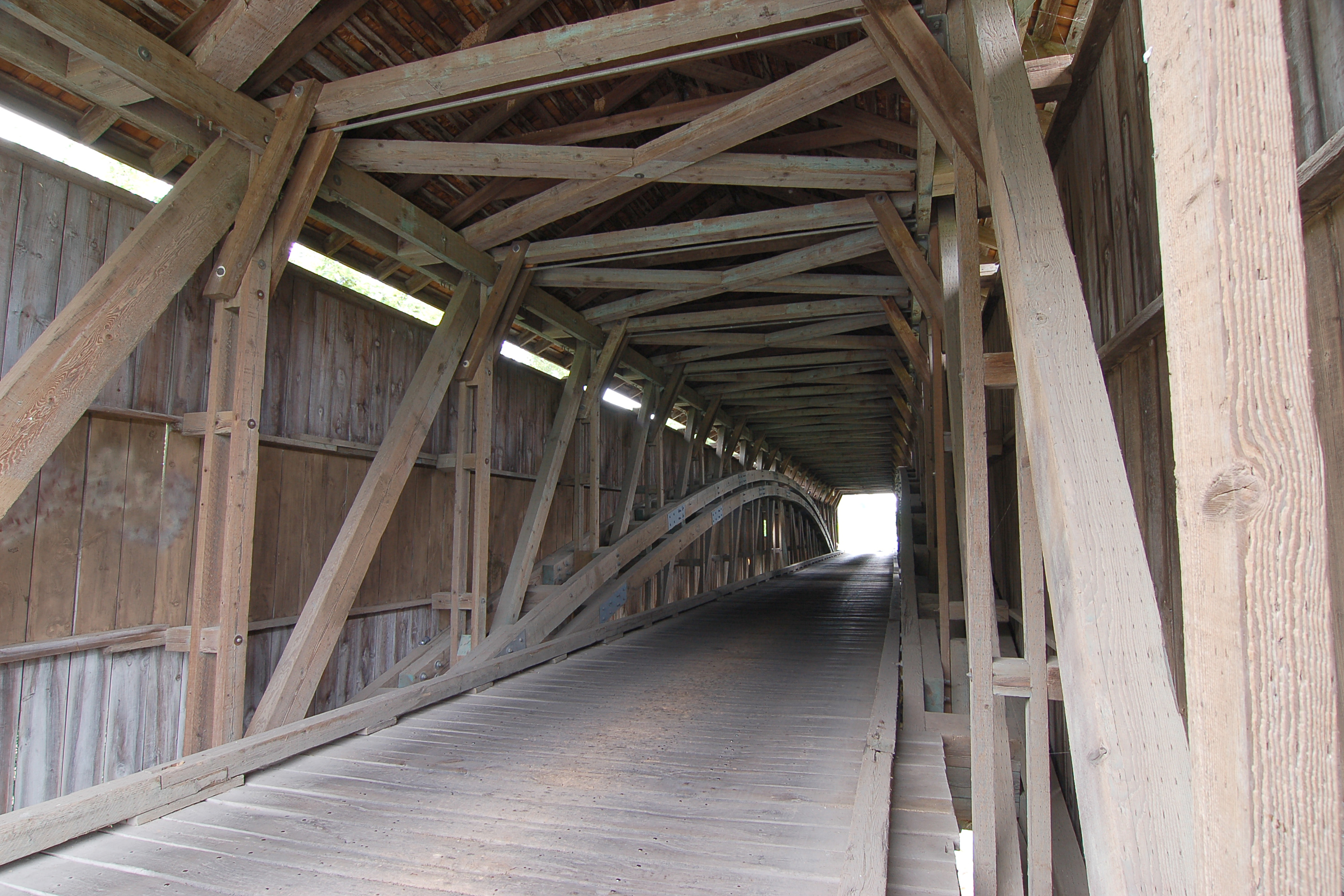
The inside of the bridge showing the Burr arch truss

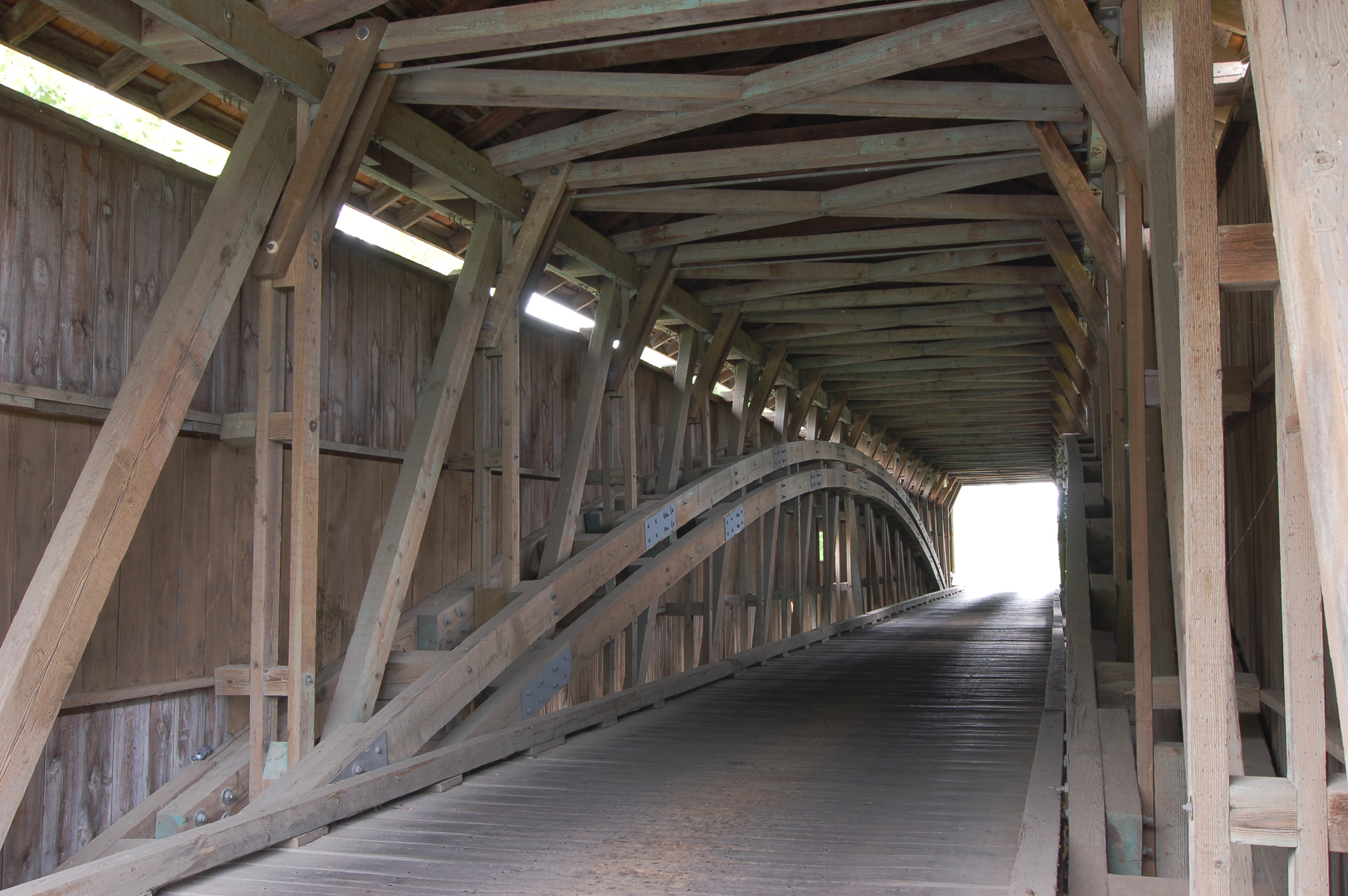
A closer look of the Burr arch bridge

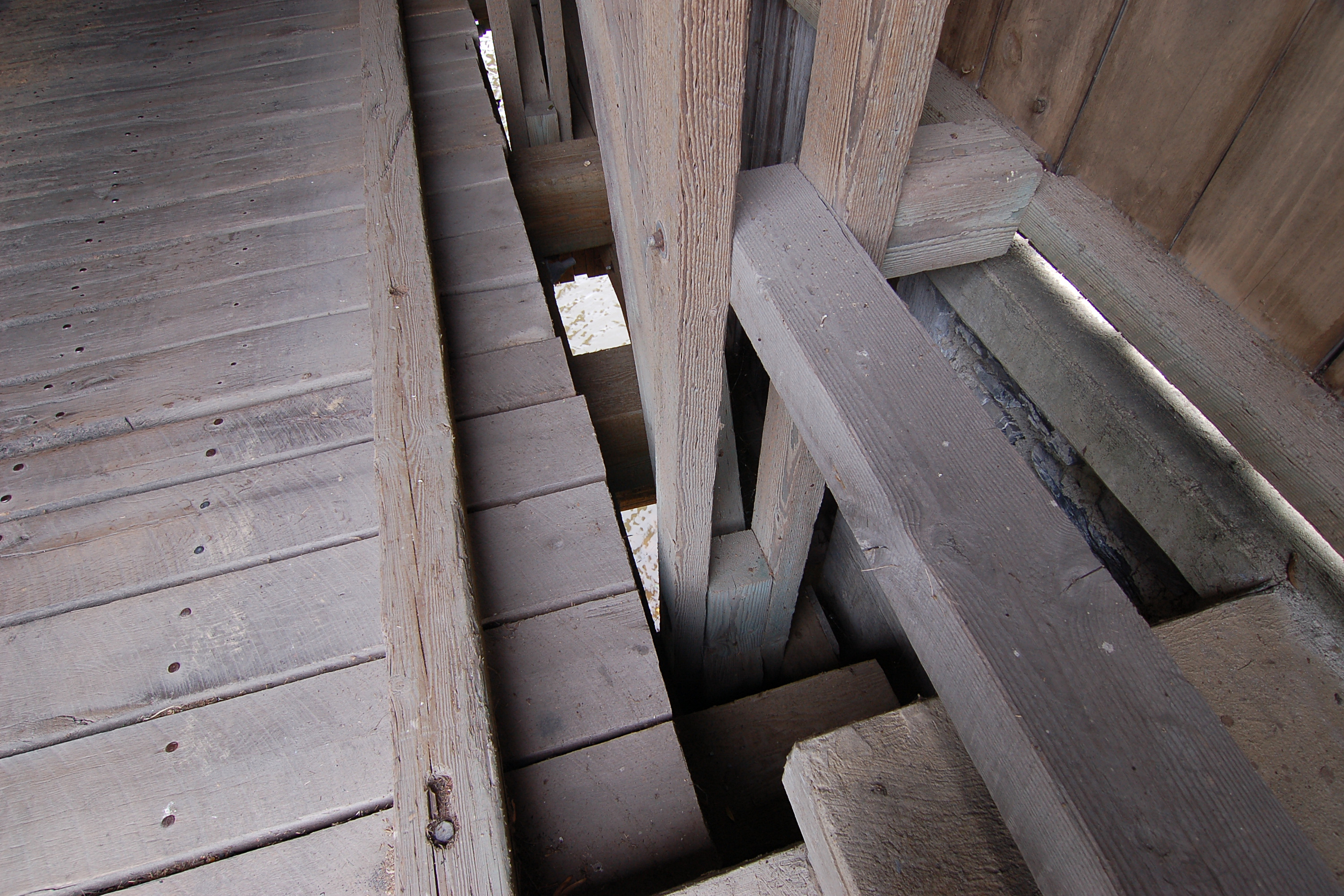
A closeup of spot where the floor meets the wall

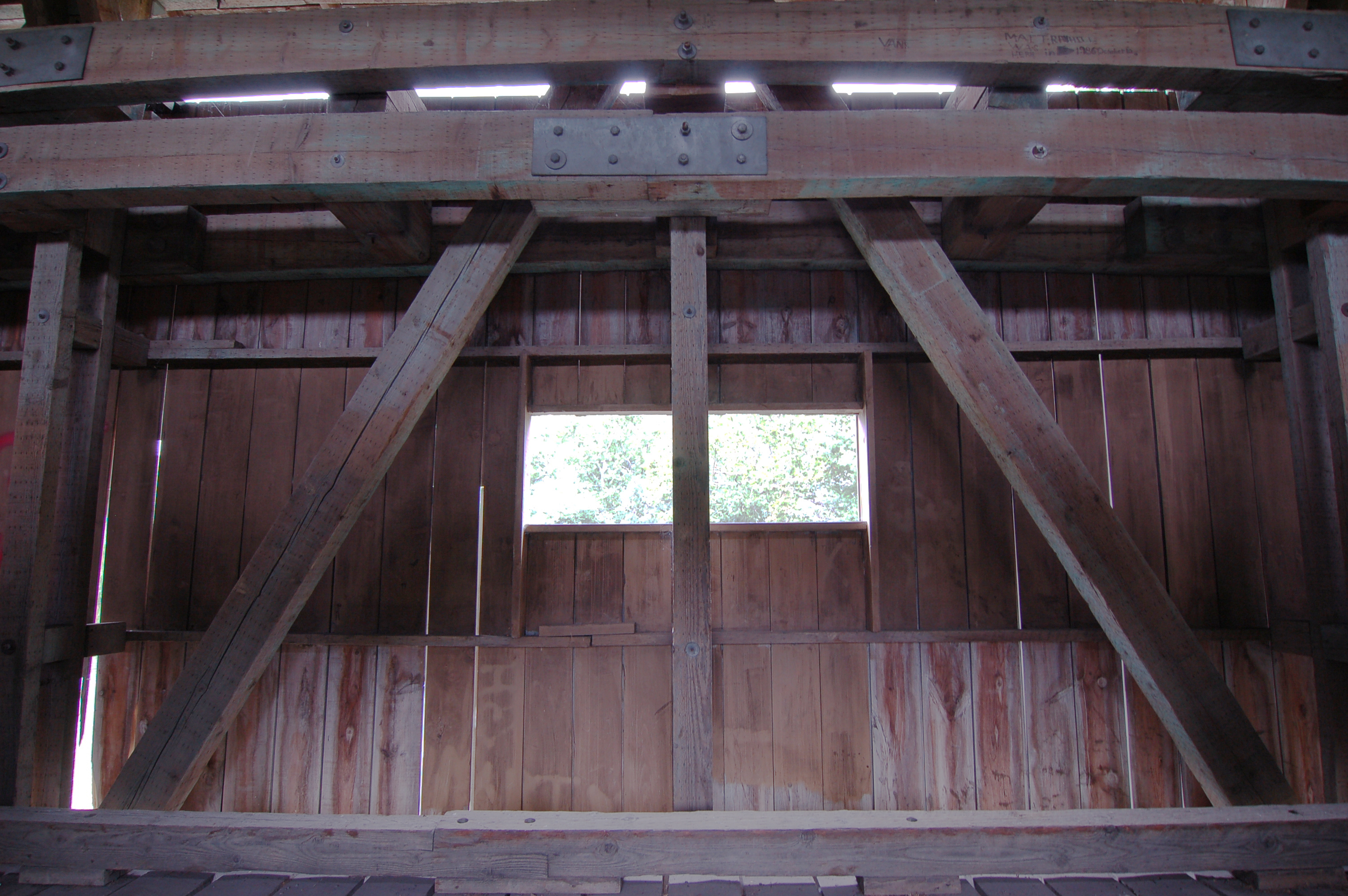
The center of the bridge highlighting the Burr arch truss

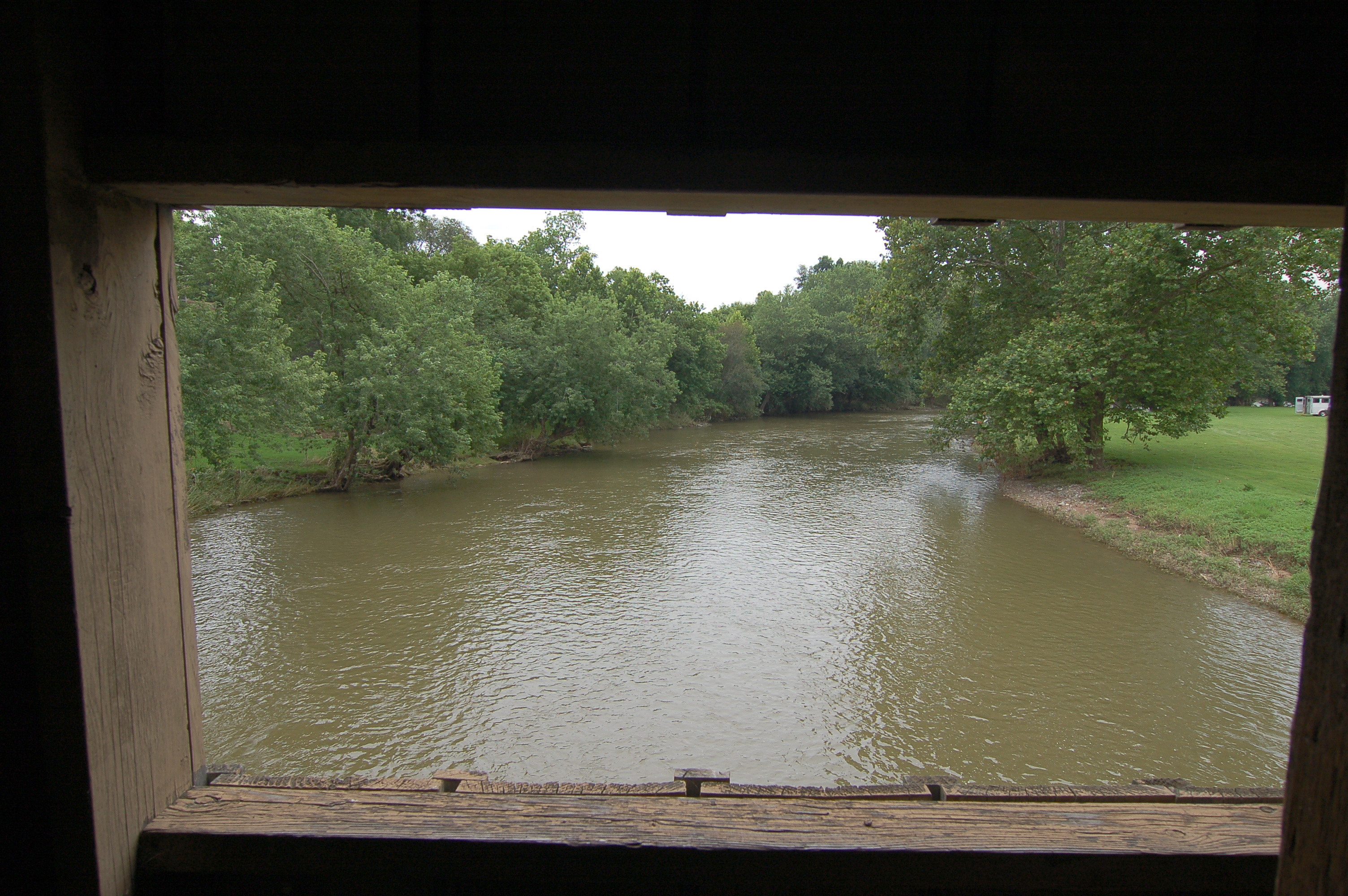
A view out of the bridge's window

== See also ==
- Burr arch truss
- List of crossings of the Conestoga River
- List of Lancaster County covered bridges
