= Pool Forge Covered Bridge =

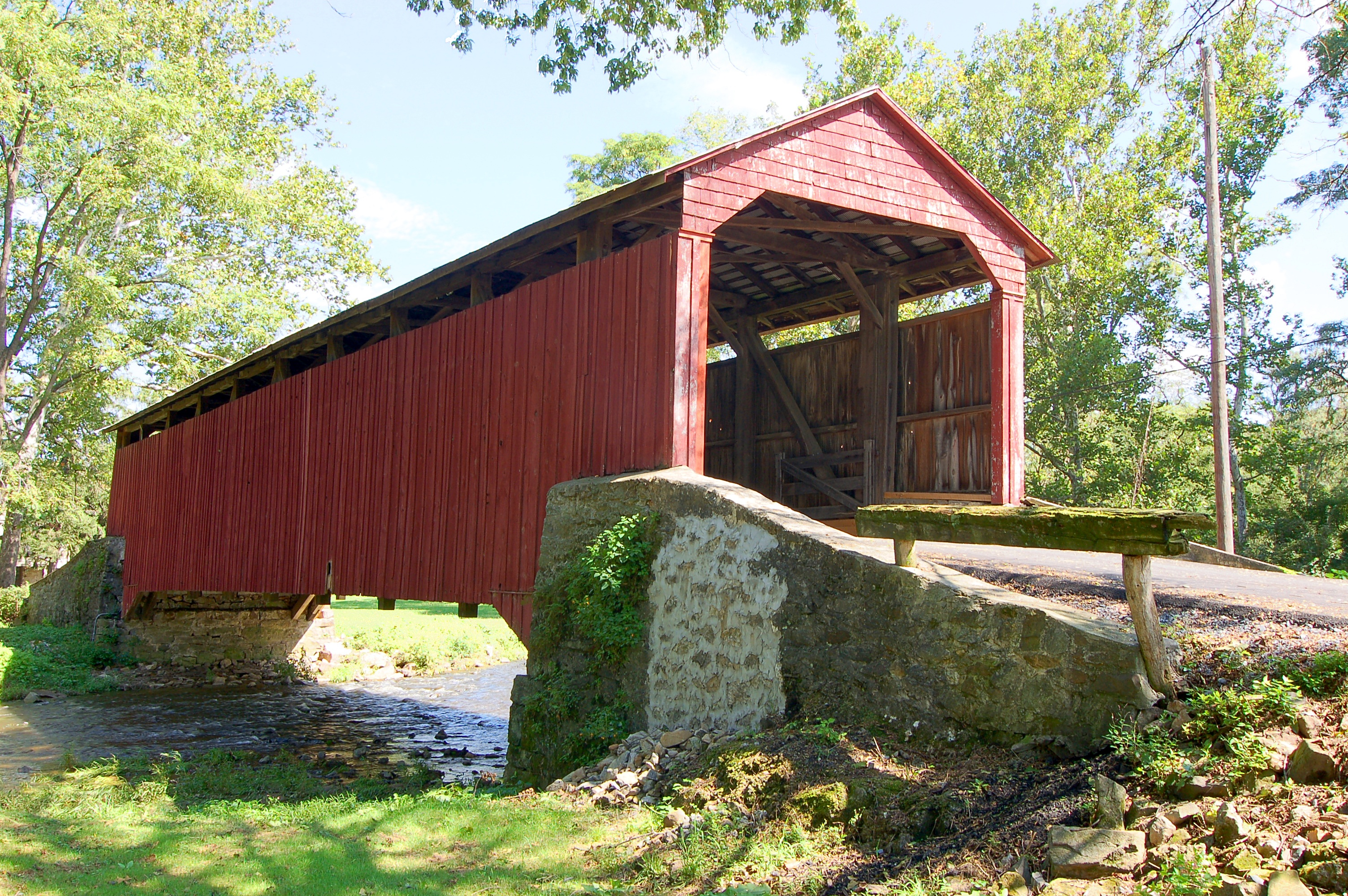
- Coordinates: 40.1297°N 75.9768°W
- Locale: Lancaster County, Pennsylvania, United States

Characteristics
- Design: single span, double Burr arch truss
- Total length: 99 feet (30.2 m)

History
- Constructed by: Levi Fink and Elias McMellen
- Construction start: 1859
- Pool Forge Covered Bridge
- U.S. National Register of Historic Places
- MPS: Covered Bridges of Lancaster County TR
- NRHP reference No.: 80003510
- Added to NRHP: December 11, 1980

Location
- Interactive map of Pool Forge Covered Bridge

The Pool Forge Covered Bridge is a covered bridge that spans the Conestoga River in Lancaster County, Pennsylvania, United States. The bridge is now on private property where it was once used as a storage barn before the owner added a road to receive vehicle traffic.

The bridge has a single span, wooden, double Burr arch trusses design with the addition of steel hanger rods. It is painted entirely red, the traditional color of Lancaster County covered bridges on the outside. The inside of the bridge is not painted. Both approaches to the bridge are painted in red without any of the traditional white paint.

The bridge's WGCB Number is 38-36-01. Added in 1980, it is listed on the National Register of Historic Places as structure number 80003510. It is located at 40°7′46.8″N 75°58′36.6″W (40.12967, -75.97683).

It is included in the Poole Forge historic district as a contributing structure.

== History ==
The bridge was built in 1859 by Levi Fink and Elias McMellen.

== Dimensions ==
- Length: 99 feet (30.2 m) total length
- Width: 15 feet (4.6 m) total width

== Gallery ==
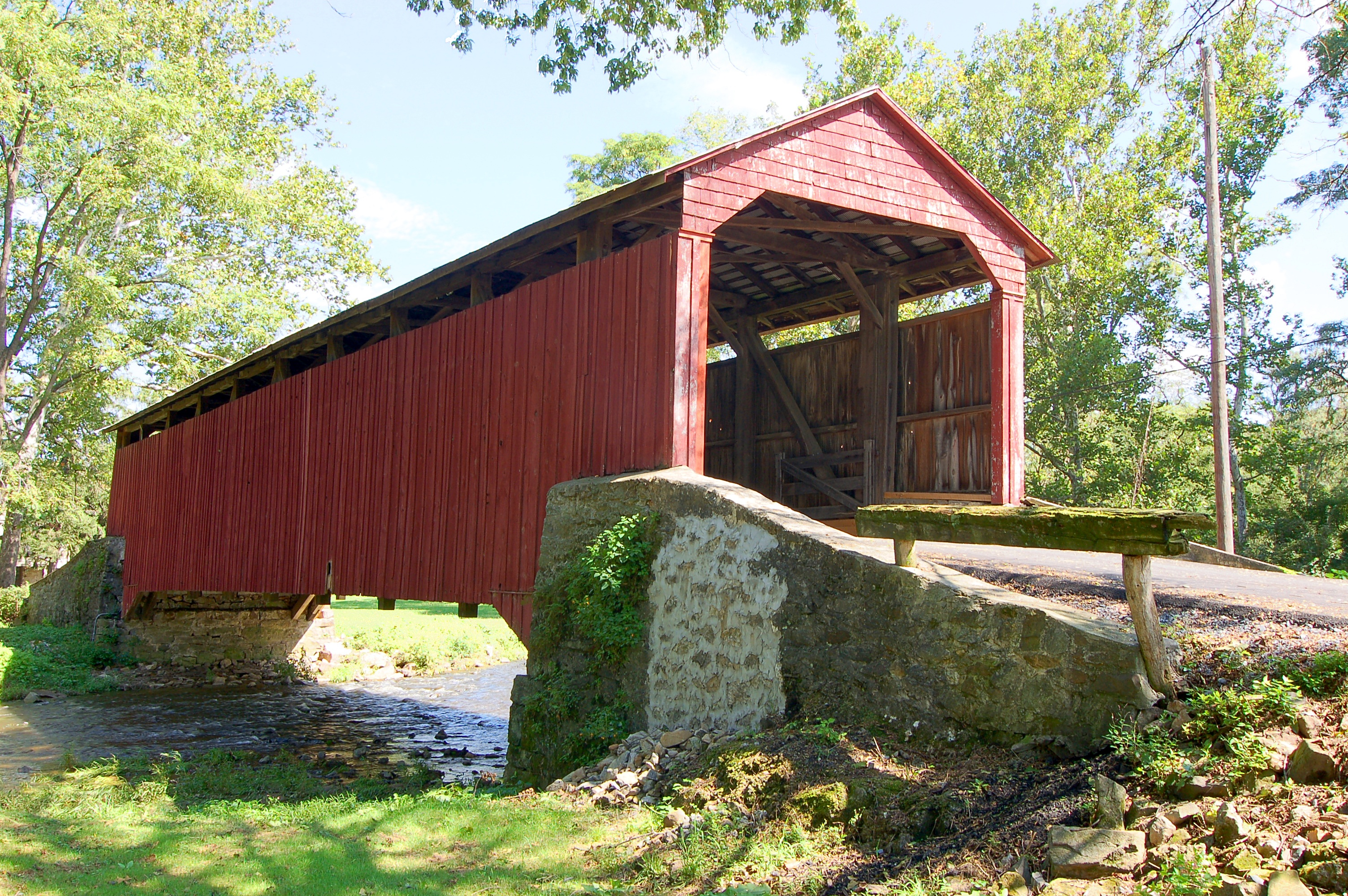
A three-quarters view of the bridge

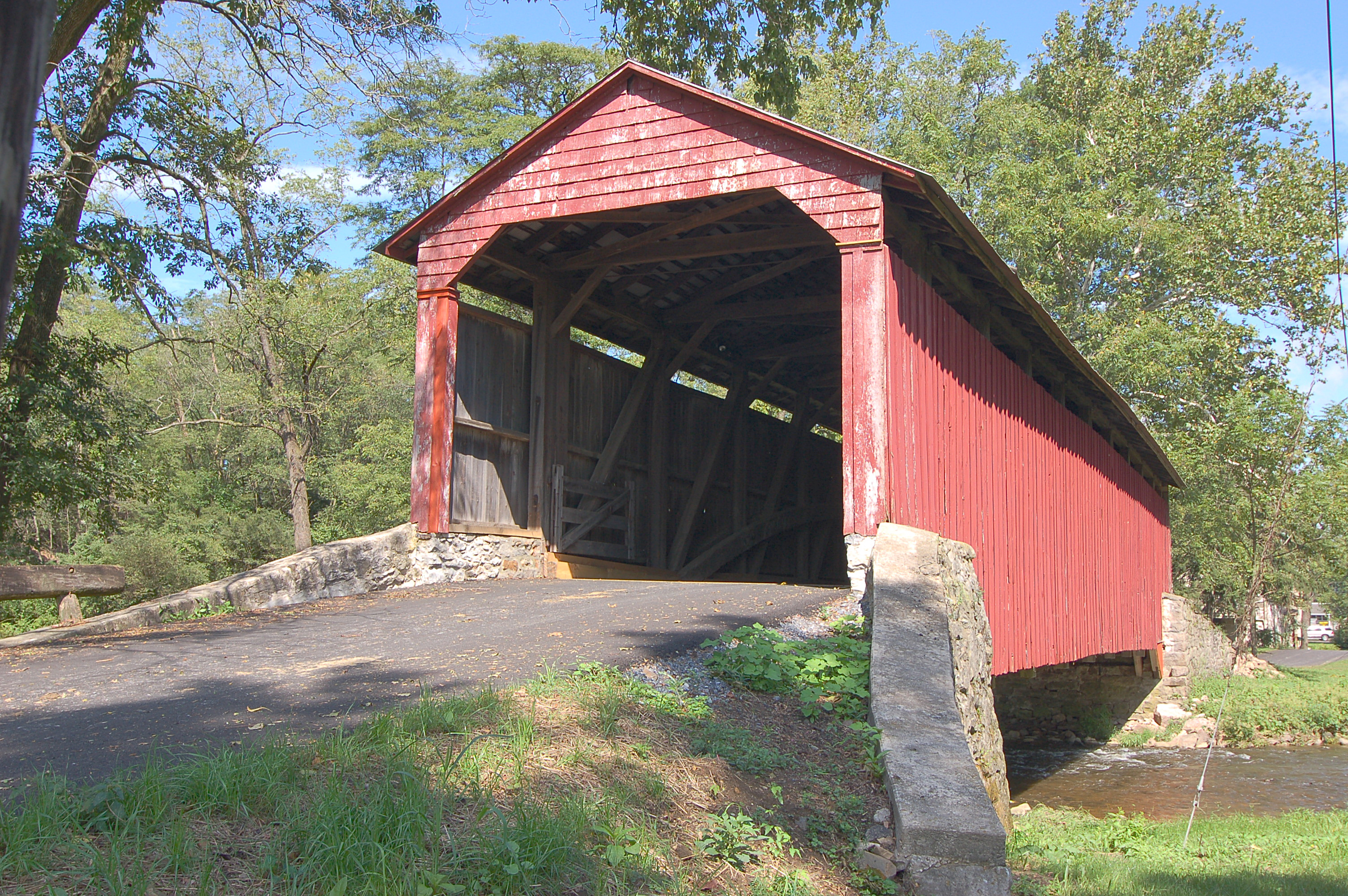
Another three-quarters view showing the same bridge approach.

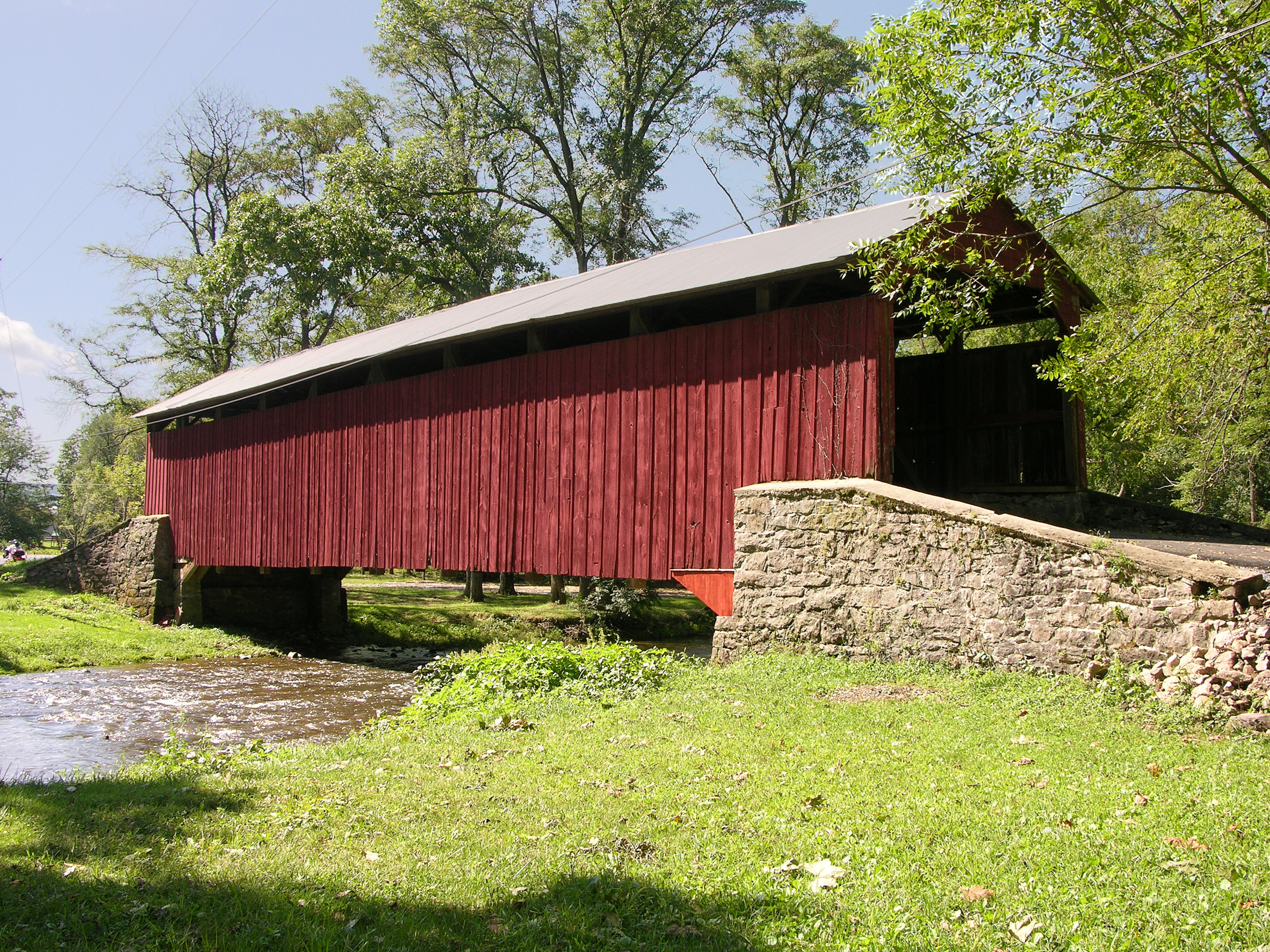
One of the sides of the bridge

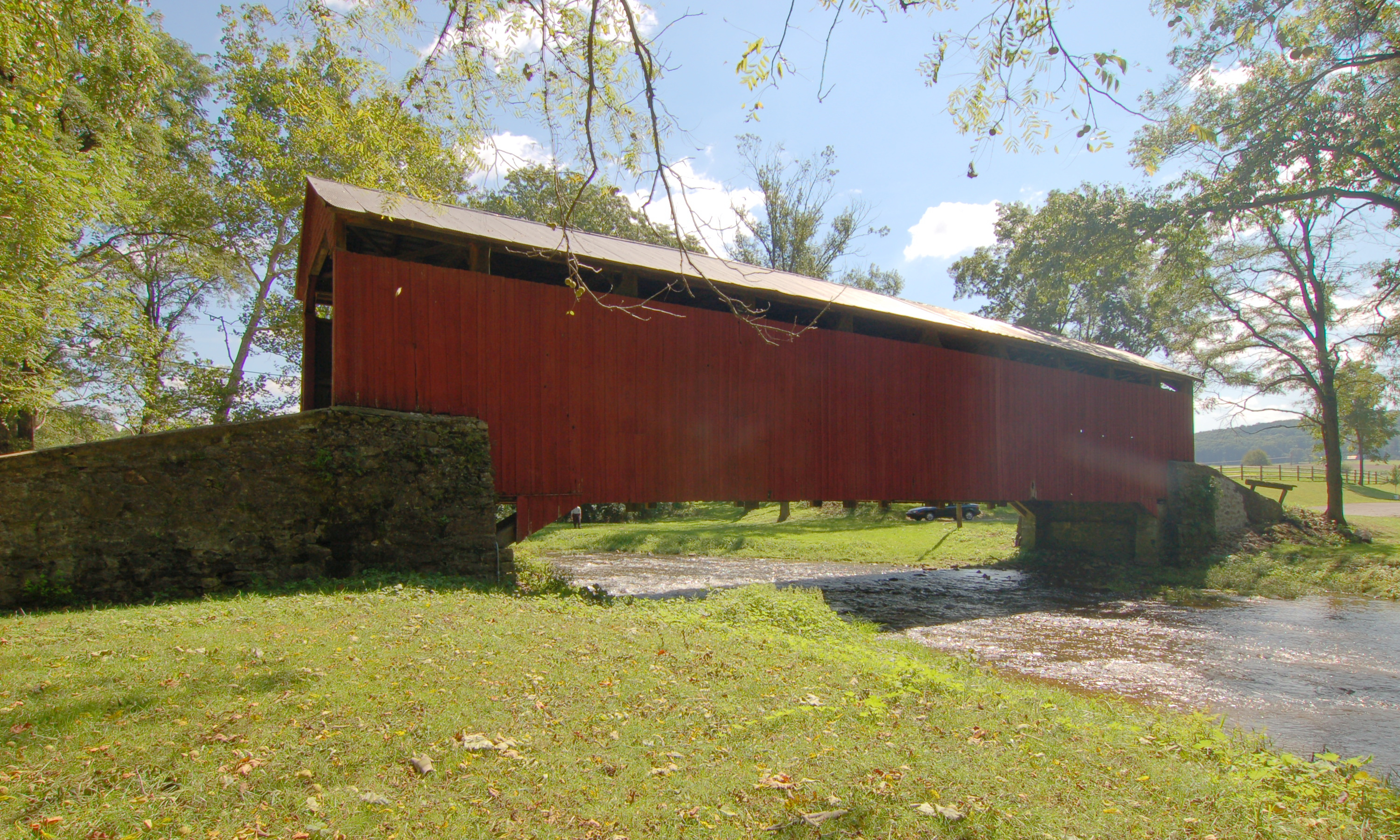
The other side of the bridge

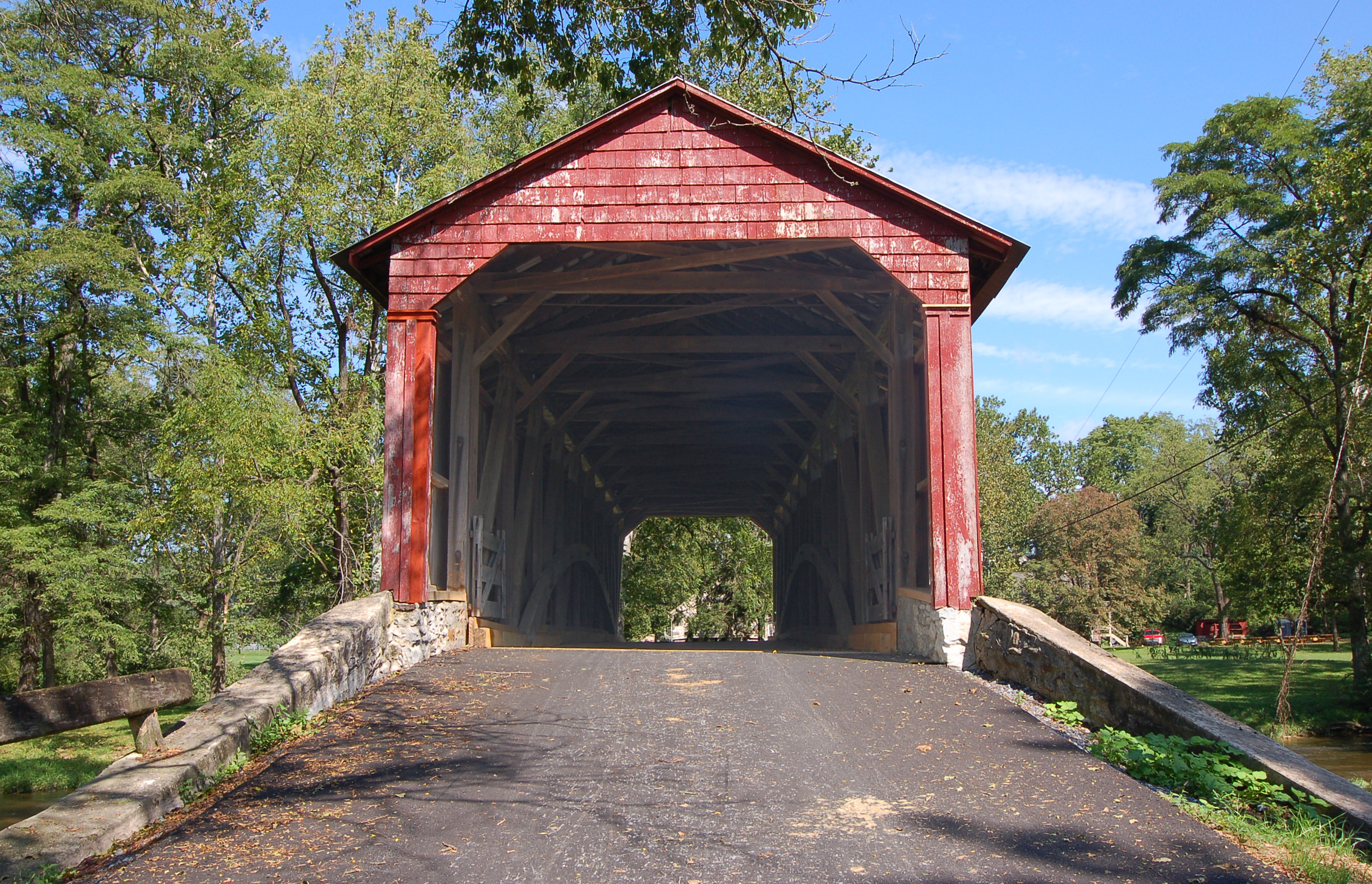
The approach to the bridge closest to the main road

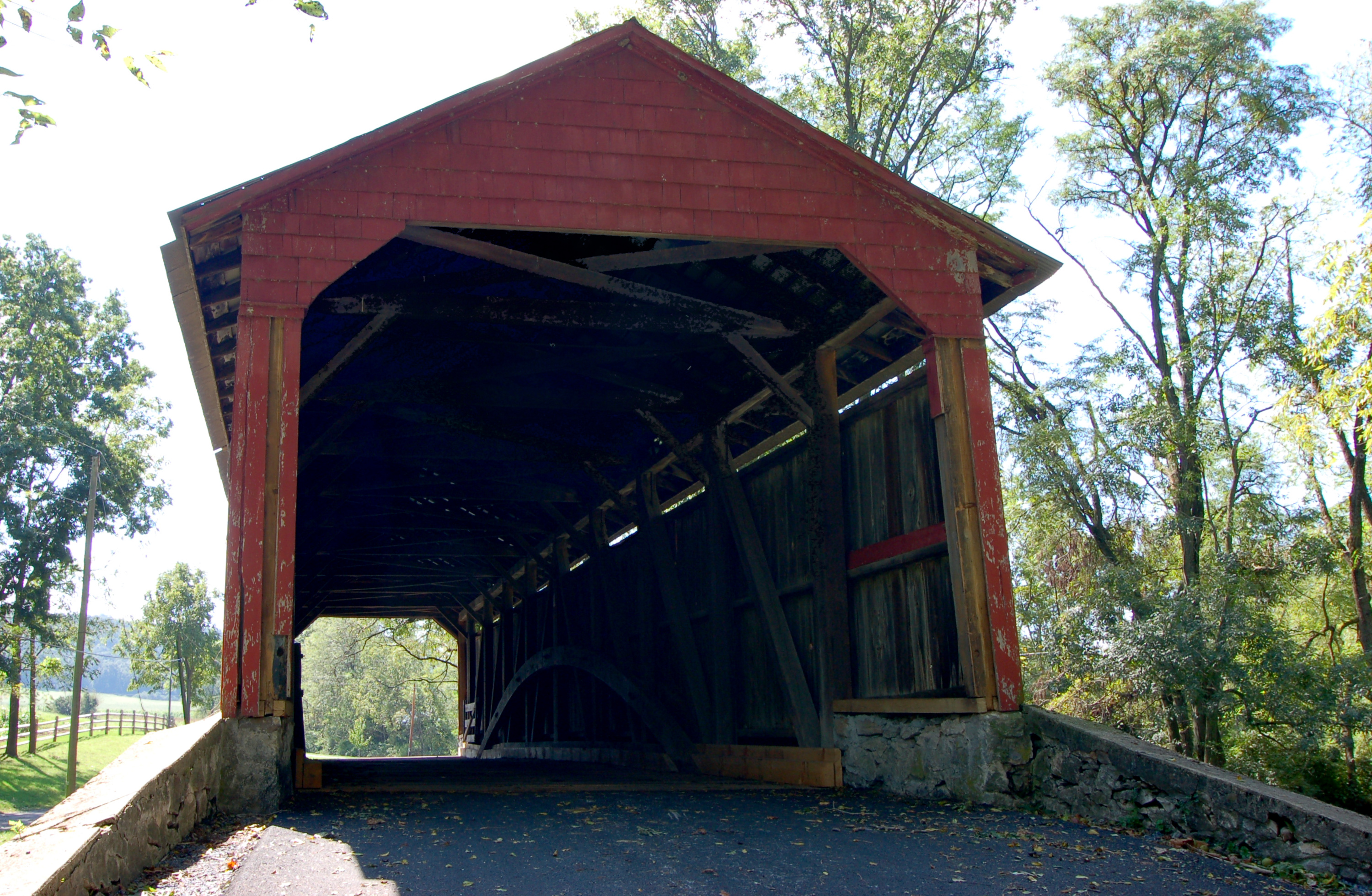
The approach farthest away from the main road entrance

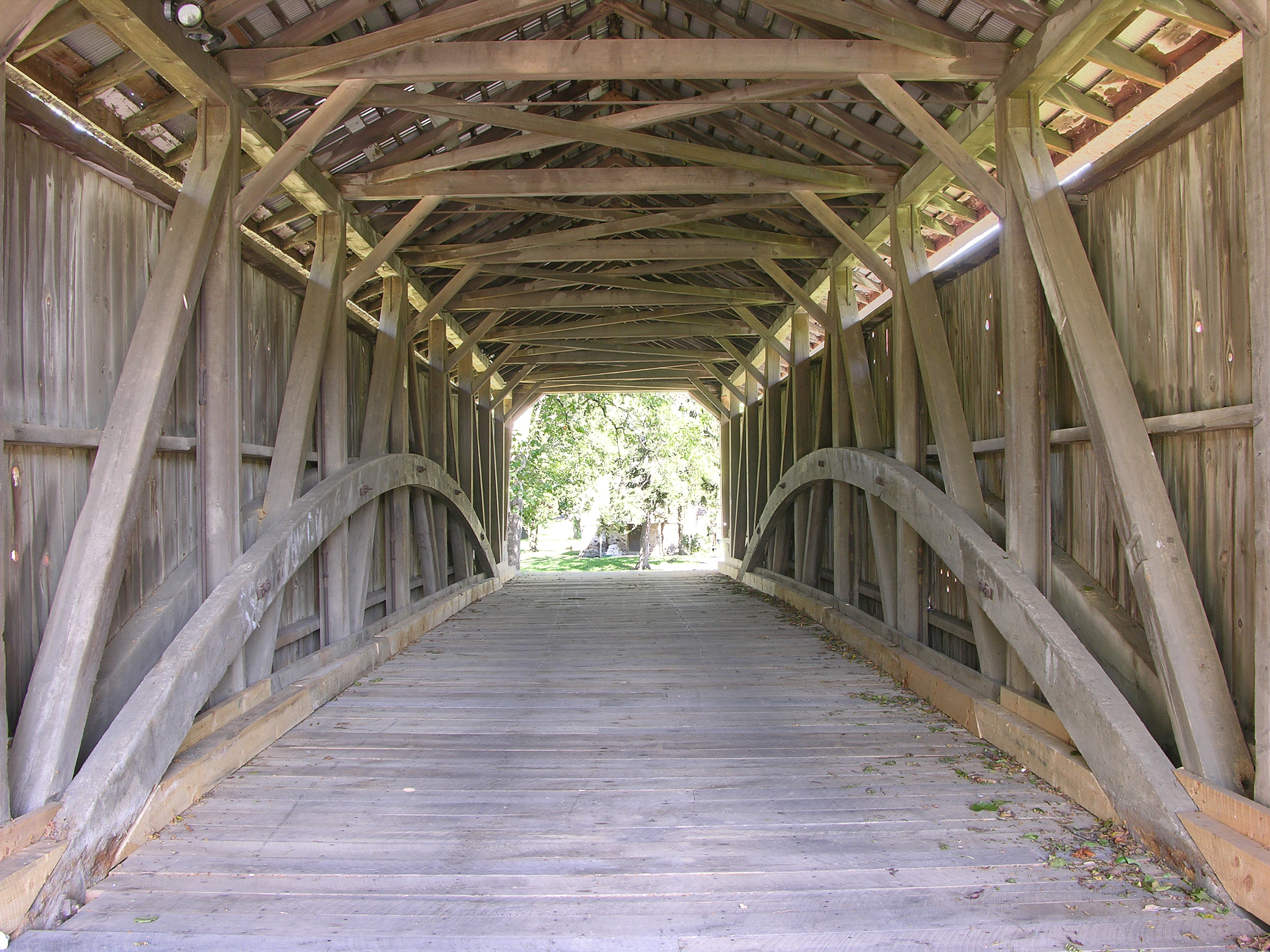
The Burr arch truss design on the inside of the bridge

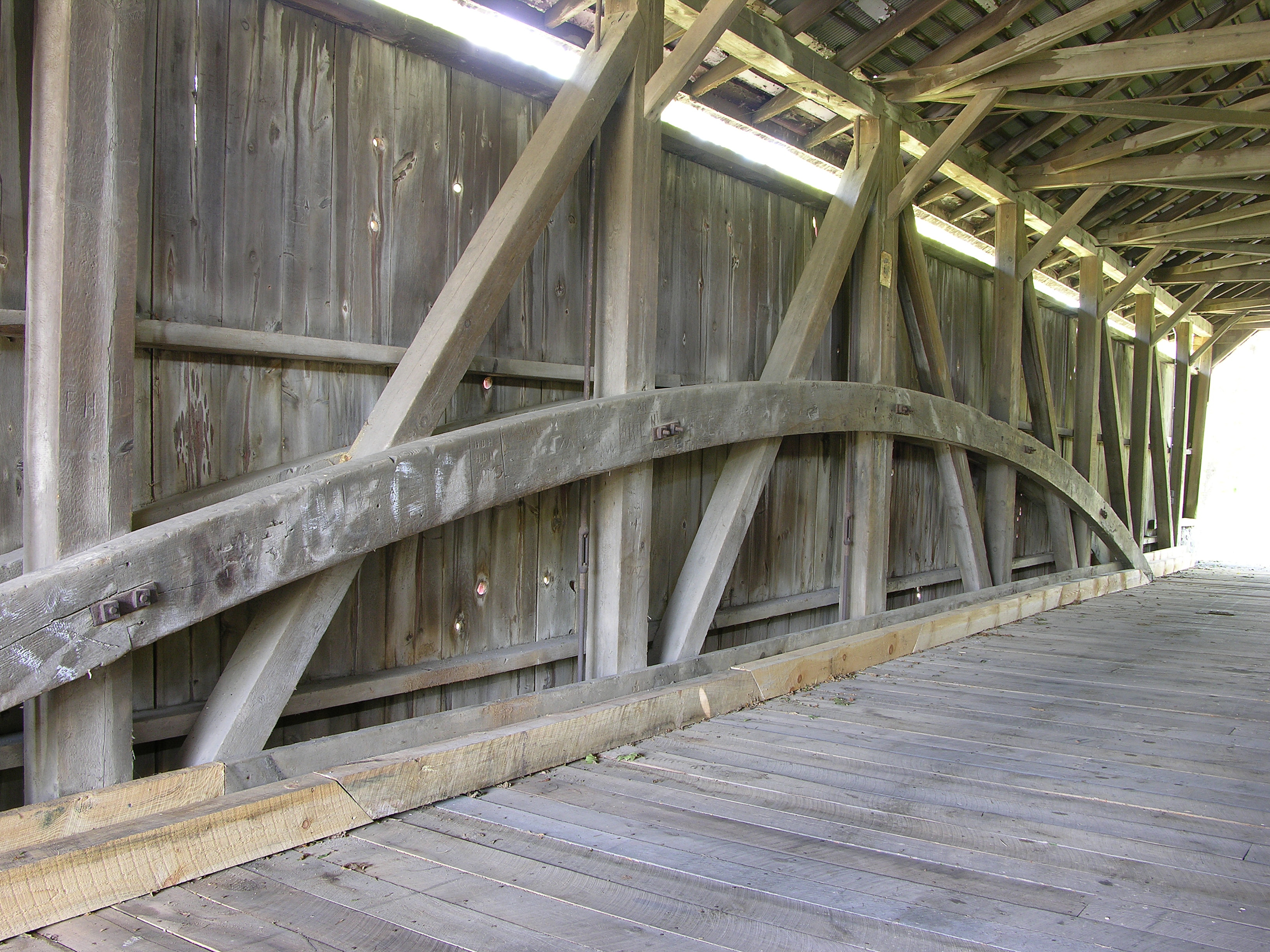
A closer look at the Burr arch truss

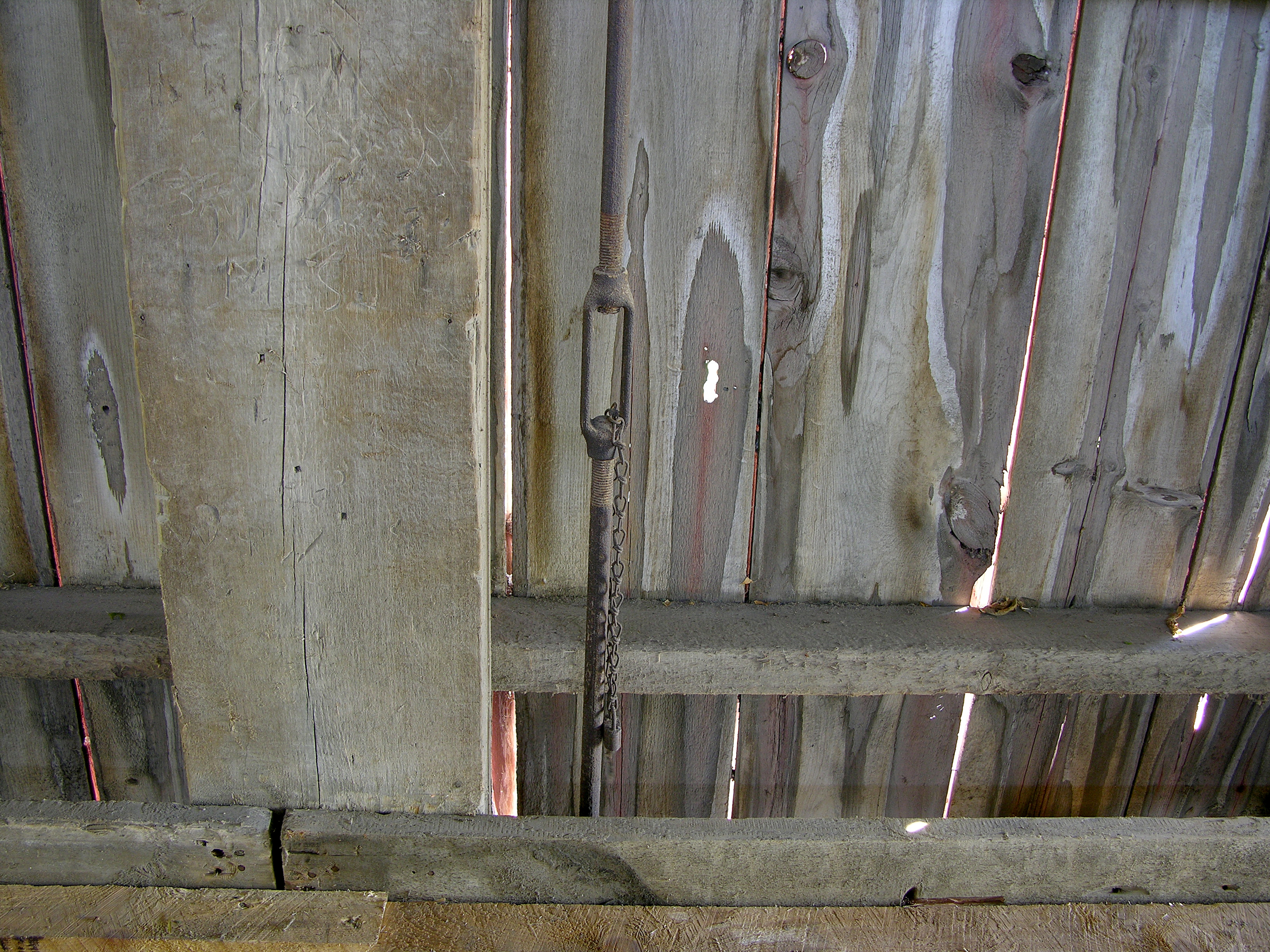
An example of the bridge's steel hanger rods

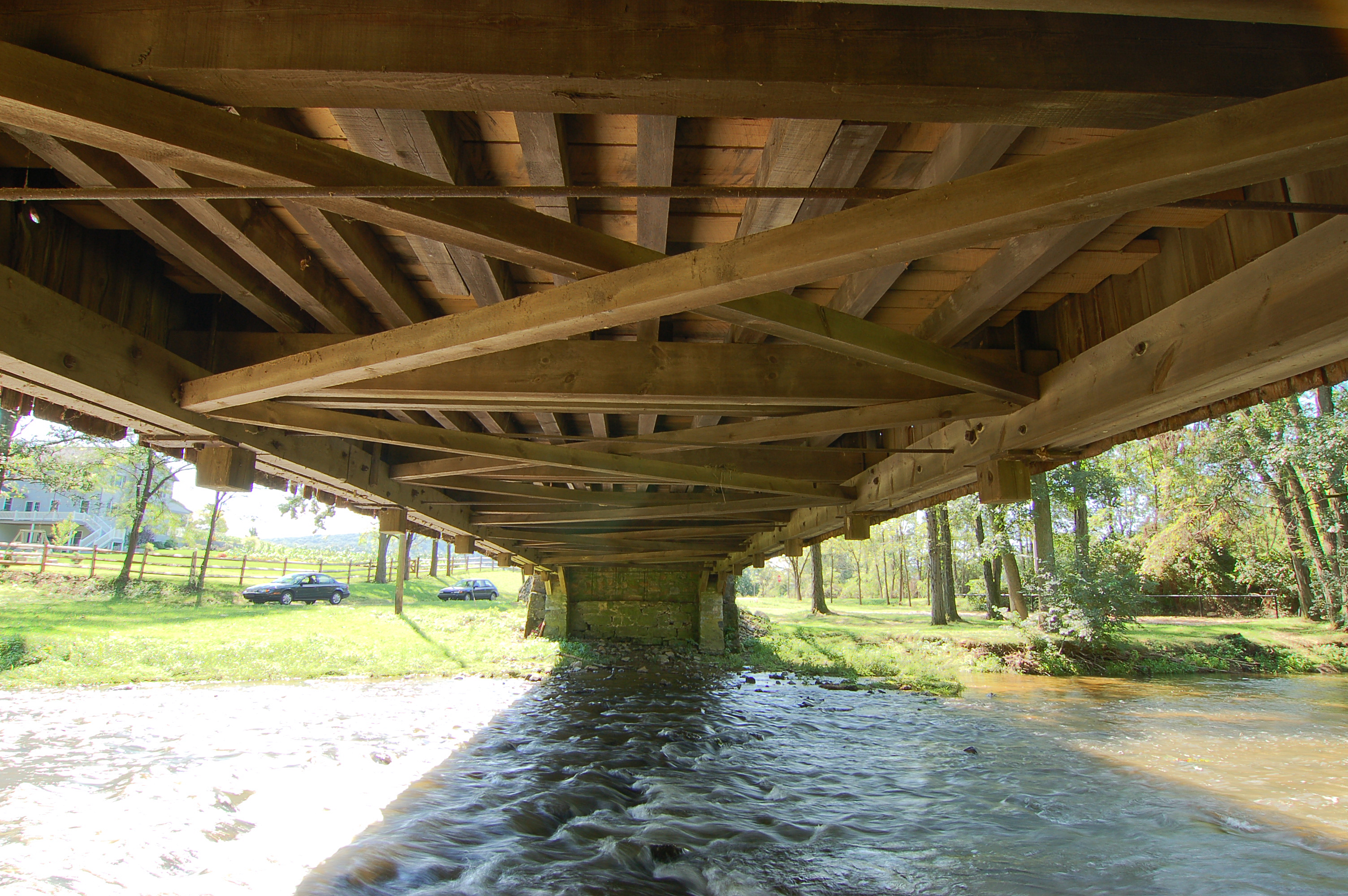
The bridge's underside structure

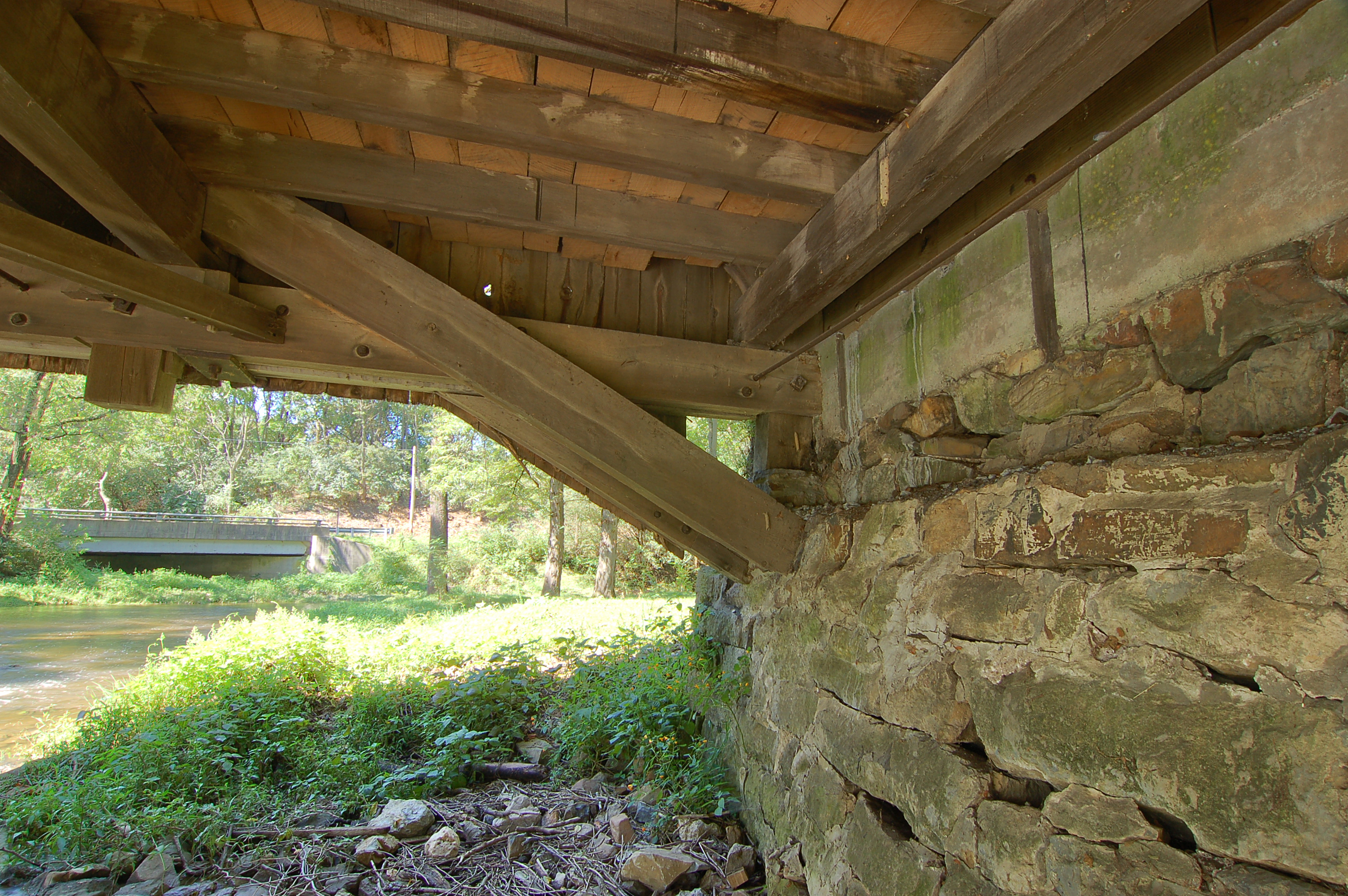
The underside of the bridge showing where the Burr arch meets the concrete bridge abutment. The concrete bridge in the background bypasses this bridge.

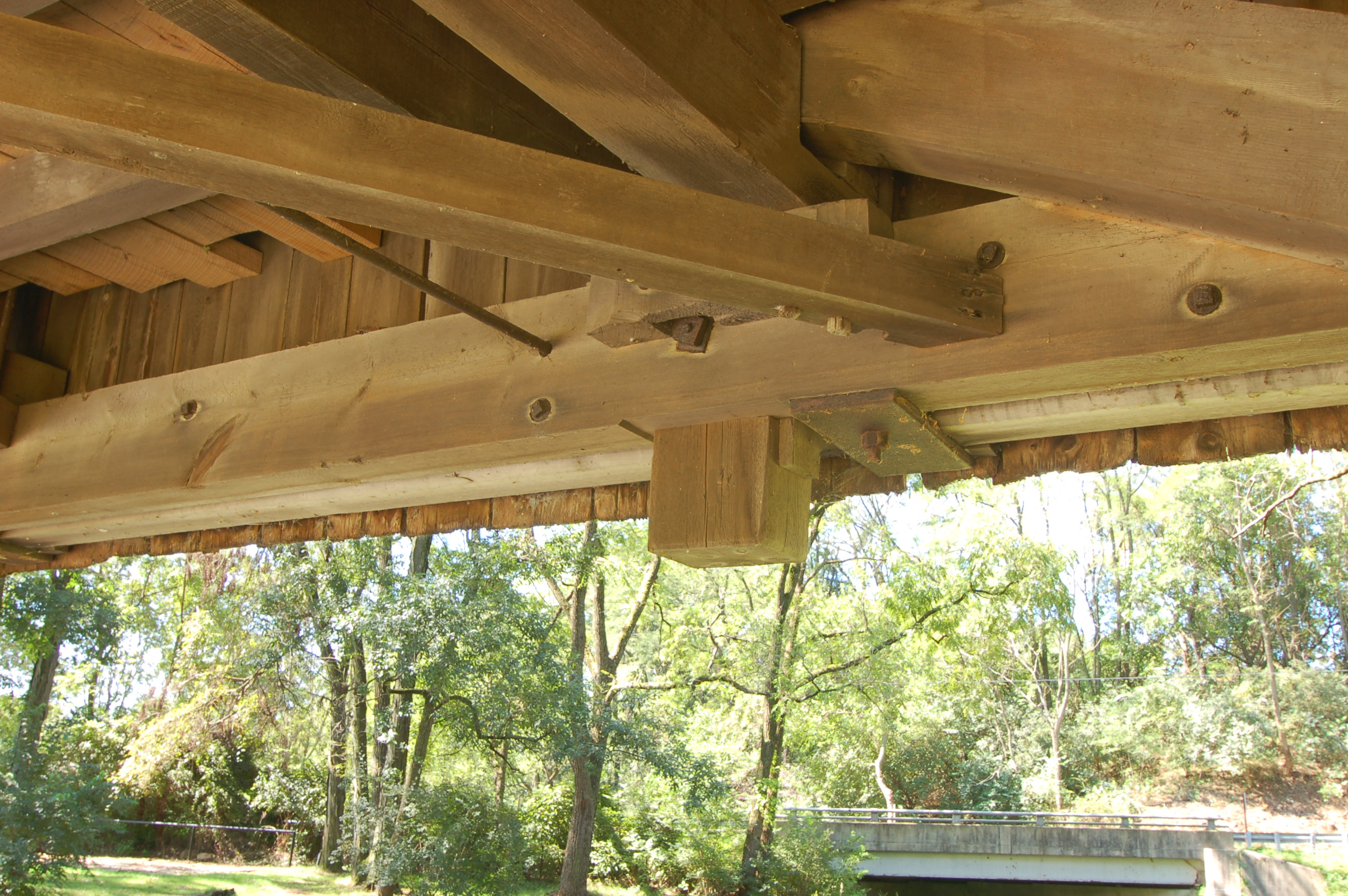
An underside bridge joint showing the Burr arch truss design.

A view from above as you approach the bridge

A view from above

== See also ==
- Burr arch truss
- List of crossings of the Conestoga River
- List of Lancaster County covered bridges
