= Conestoga Creek Viaduct =

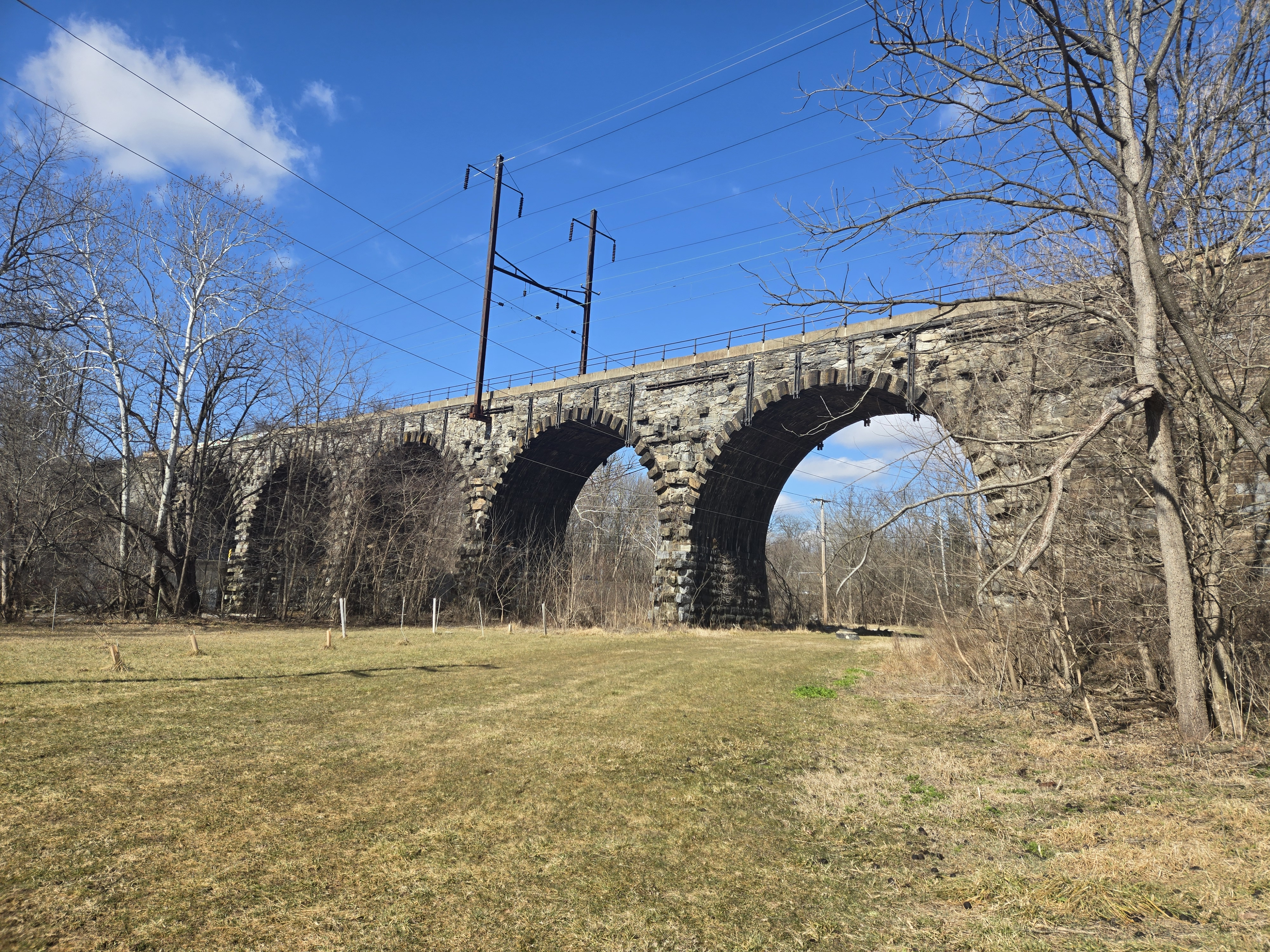
- The Conestoga Creek Viaduct, 2026
- Coordinates: 40°03′00″N 76°16′41″W
- Carries: Amtrak Keystone Corridor
- Crosses: Conestoga River and PA 23 (East Walnut Street)
- Locale: Lancaster, Pennsylvania, USA

Characteristics
- Design: Arch bridge
- Material: Stone
- Total length: 330 feet (100 m)
- Width: two tracks
- Longest span: 55 feet (17 m)
- No. of spans: 5
- Piers in water: 3

History
- Construction start: 1887
- Construction end: 1888

Location
- Interactive map of Conestoga Creek Viaduct

The Conestoga Creek Viaduct spans the Conestoga River east of Lancaster, Pennsylvania. The present structure, built in 1887–88, is a five-span, two-track stone arch railroad bridge. The first crossing at this location was a 1,412 feet (430 m) series of 11 wooden Town lattice trusses constructed in 1829 for the Columbia and Philadelphia Railroad, which was purchased by the Pennsylvania Railroad (PRR) and incorporated into its main line in 1857. PRR shortened the viaduct and replaced the remaining wooden trusses with iron Whipple trusses in 1863. The 1887-88 stone arch replacement was originally intended to be four tracks wide, but only half of the superstructure width (two tracks) was constructed, leaving an unfinished spandrel wall on the southern face. Tie rods were added in 1930 to brace the spandrel walls.

== See also ==
- List of bridges documented by the Historic American Engineering Record in Pennsylvania
- List of crossings of the Conestoga River
