= Bridge in West Earl Township =

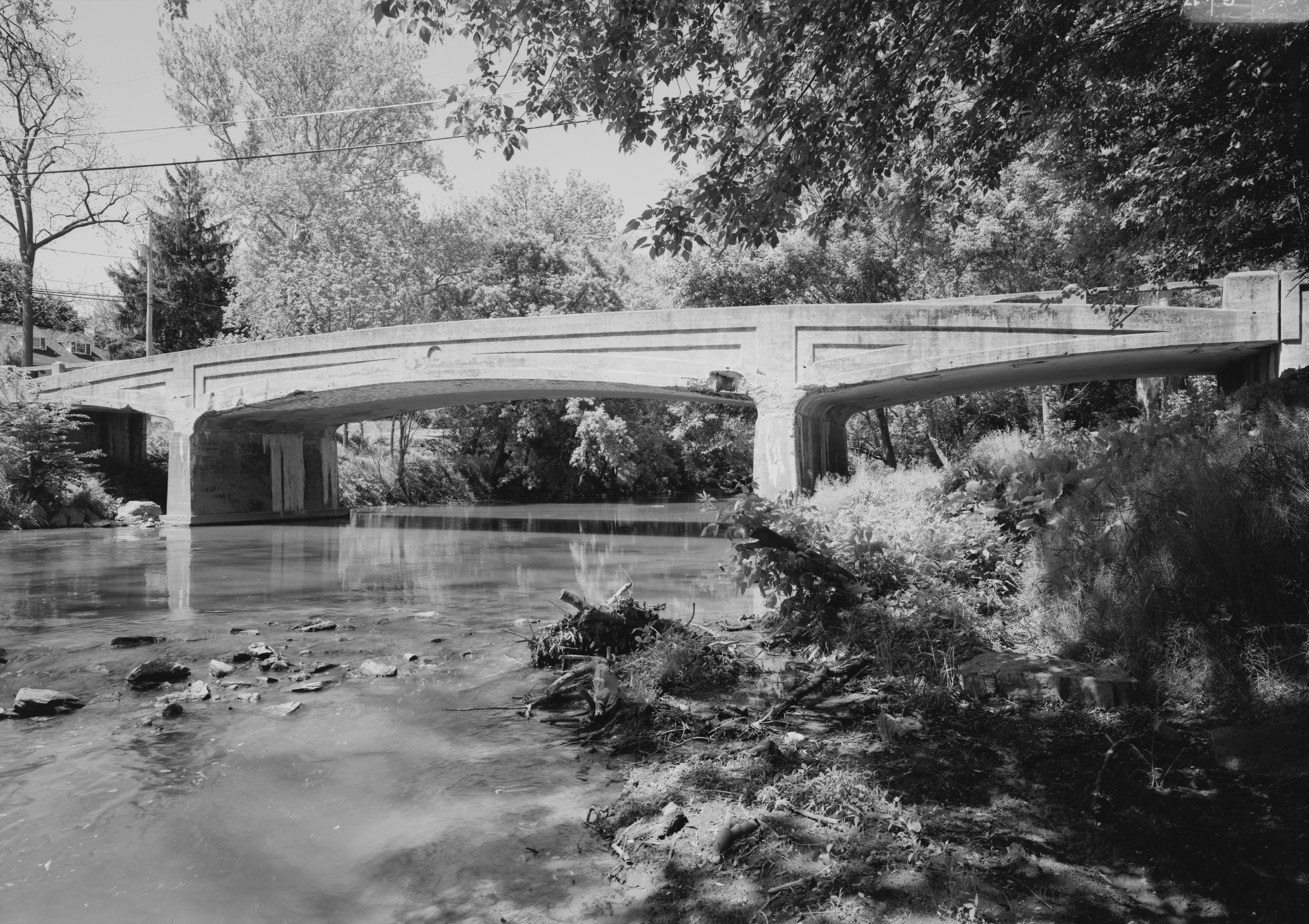
- Bridge in West Earl Township in 1999.
- Coordinates: 40°07′40″N 76°11′59″W
- Carries: Farmersville Road (State Route 1010)
- Crosses: Conestoga River
- Locale: Brownstown, Pennsylvania
- Other name(s): Big Conestoga Creek Bridge No. 12; Sergeant Melvin R. Wink Memorial Bridge
- Maintained by: PennDOT

Characteristics
- Design: Cantilevered girder
- Material: Concrete
- Total length: 130 feet (40 m)
- Width: 18 feet (5.5 m)
- Longest span: 62 feet (19 m)
- No. of spans: 3
- Piers in water: 2
- Load limit: 20 short tons (18,000 kg)

History
- Designer: Frank H. Shaw
- Constructed by: Paul D. Kauffman
- Bridge in West Earl Township
- U.S. National Register of Historic Places
- Location within Pennsylvania Location within the United States
- Coordinates: 40°07′40″N 76°11′59″W
- Area: less than one acre
- Built: 1917
- Built by: Paul D.Kauffman
- Architect: Frank H. Shaw
- MPS: Highway Bridges Owned by the Commonwealth of Pennsylvania, Department of Transportation TR
- NRHP reference No.: 88000875
- Added to NRHP: June 22, 1988

Location
- Interactive map of Bridge in West Earl Township

The Bridge in West Earl Township, as it is designated on the National Register of Historic Places, is also known by its historic name, Big Conestoga Creek Bridge No. 12. It carries Farmersville Road (unsigned SR 1010) across the Conestoga River at Brownstown, West Earl Township, Pennsylvania, in the United States. The bridge is notable for its form, a three-span, continuous, arched concrete girder that does not touch the abutments. Designer Frank H. Shaw was a consulting engineer to Lancaster County when the bridge was constructed in 1917, but appointed county engineer that same year. The bridge was replaced with a new three-span structure in 2019. It is now known as the Sergeant Melvin R. Wink Memorial Bridge.

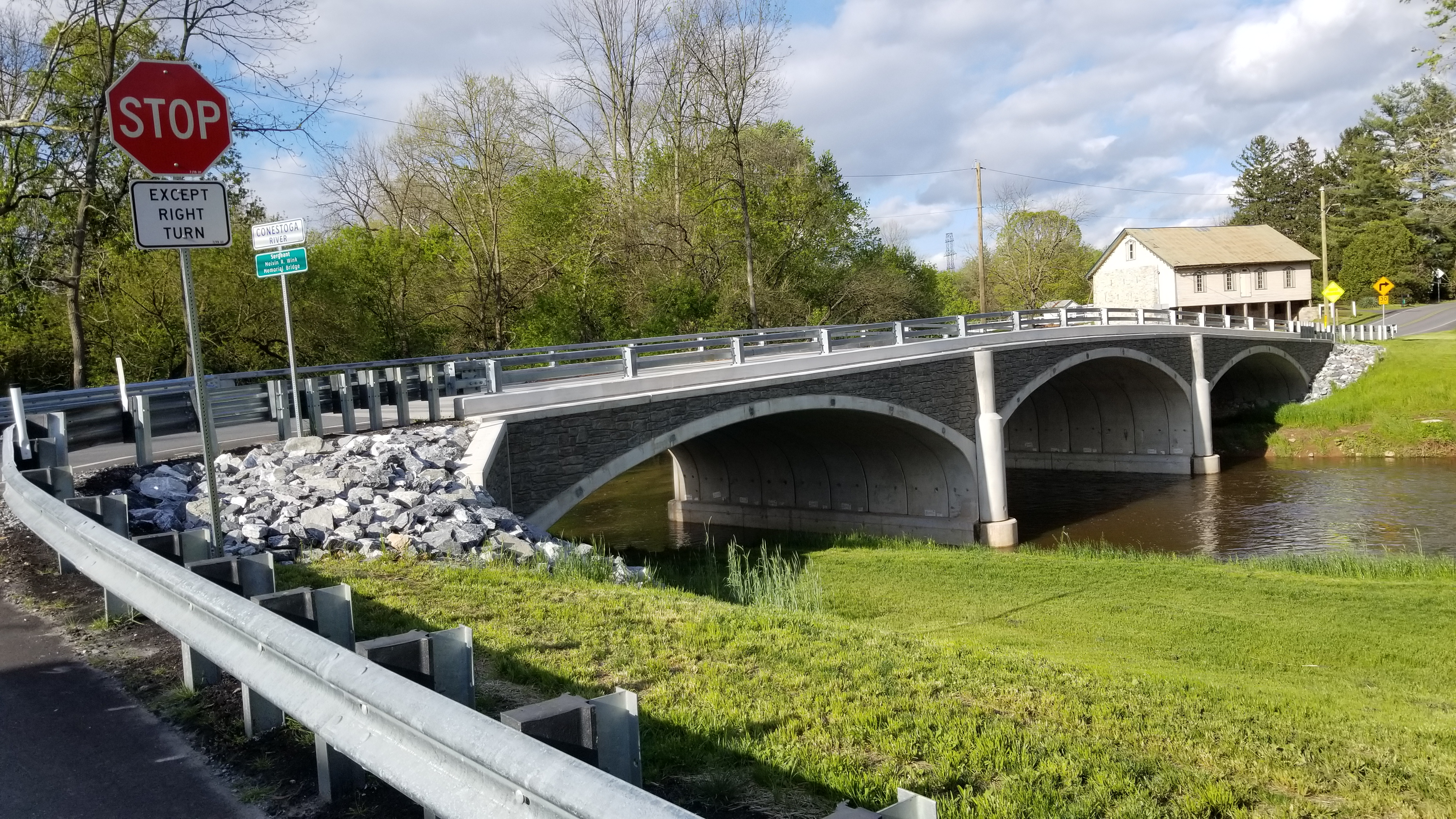
2019 Farmersville Road Bridge in Brownstown PA. Consideration was given to the aesthetics of the new bridge, since it replaced a National Historic Landmark.

== See also ==
- List of bridges documented by the Historic American Engineering Record in Pennsylvania
- List of bridges on the National Register of Historic Places in Pennsylvania
- List of crossings of the Conestoga River
- National Register of Historic Places listings in Lancaster County, Pennsylvania
