= Weaver's Mill Covered Bridge =

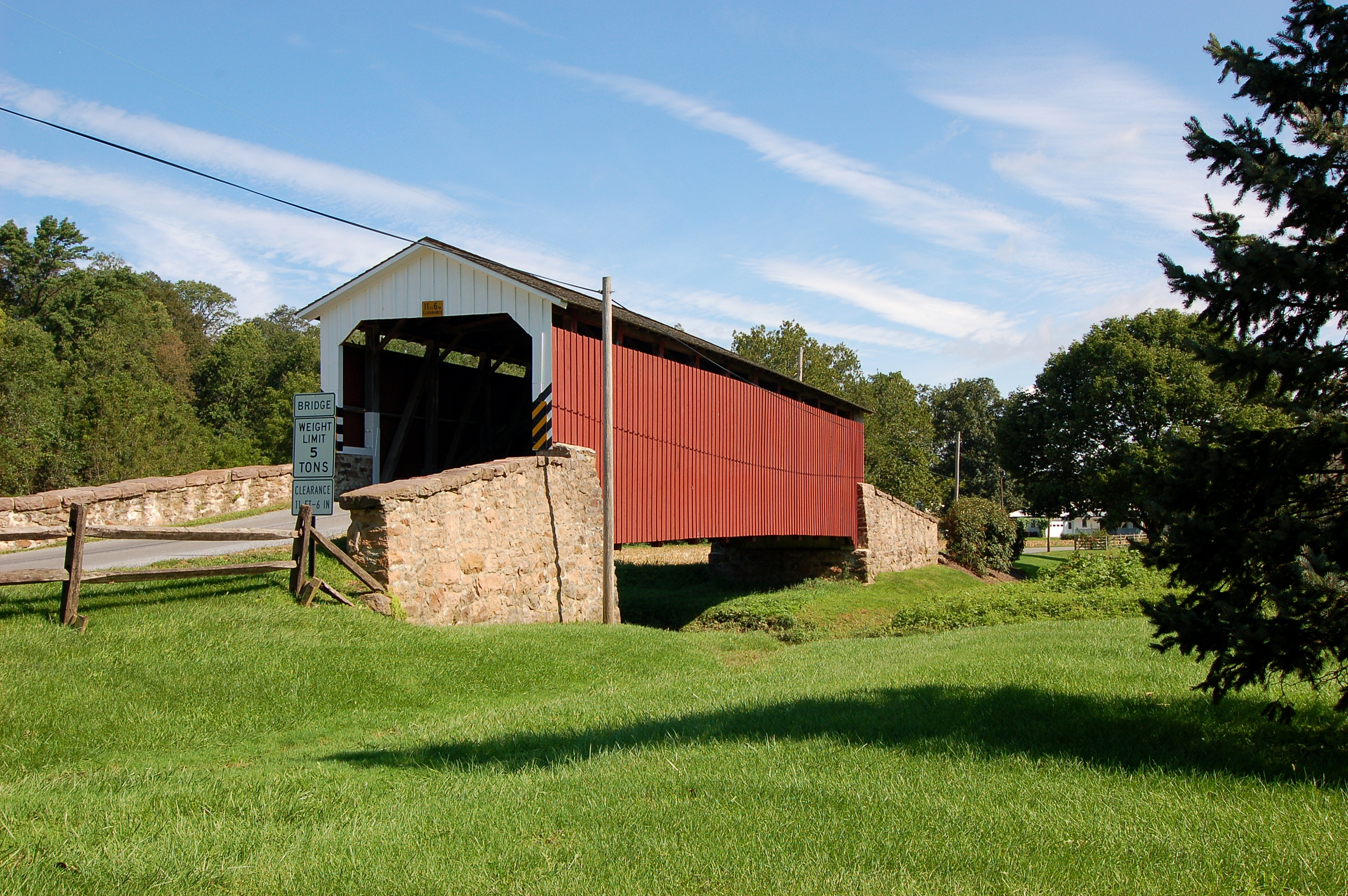
- Coordinates: 40.1412°N 75.9978°W
- Locale: Lancaster County, Pennsylvania, United States

Characteristics
- Design: single span, double Burr arch truss
- Total length: 85 feet (25.9 m)

History
- Constructed by: B. J. Carter and J. F. Stauffer
- Construction start: 1878
- Weaver's Mill Covered Bridge
- U.S. National Register of Historic Places
- MPS: Covered Bridges of Lancaster County TR
- NRHP reference No.: 80003511
- Added to NRHP: December 11, 1980

Location
- Interactive map of Weaver's Mill Covered Bridge

The Weaver's Mill Covered Bridge is a covered bridge that spans the Conestoga River in Lancaster County, Pennsylvania, United States. The 85-foot-long (26 m), 15-foot-wide (4.6 m) bridge was built in 1878 by B. C. Carter and J. F. Stauffer across Conestoga River. It is also known as Isaac Shearer's Mill Bridge.

The bridge has a single span, wooden, double Burr arch trusses design with the addition of steel hanger rods. It is painted red, the traditional color of Lancaster County covered bridges, on both the inside and outside. Both approaches to the bridge are painted in the traditional white color.

The bridge's WGCB Number is 38-36-02. Added in 1980, it is listed on the National Register of Historic Places as structure number 80003511. It is located at 40°8′28.2″N 75°59′52.2″W (40.14117, -75.99783).

== Dimensions ==
- Length: 85 feet (25.9 m) total length
- Width: 15 feet (4.6 m) total width

== Gallery ==
View from road

View from inside

View from the air near road

View from the air near river

== See also ==
- Burr arch truss
- List of crossings of the Conestoga River
- List of Lancaster County covered bridges
