= Conestoga River =

River in Pennsylvania, United States

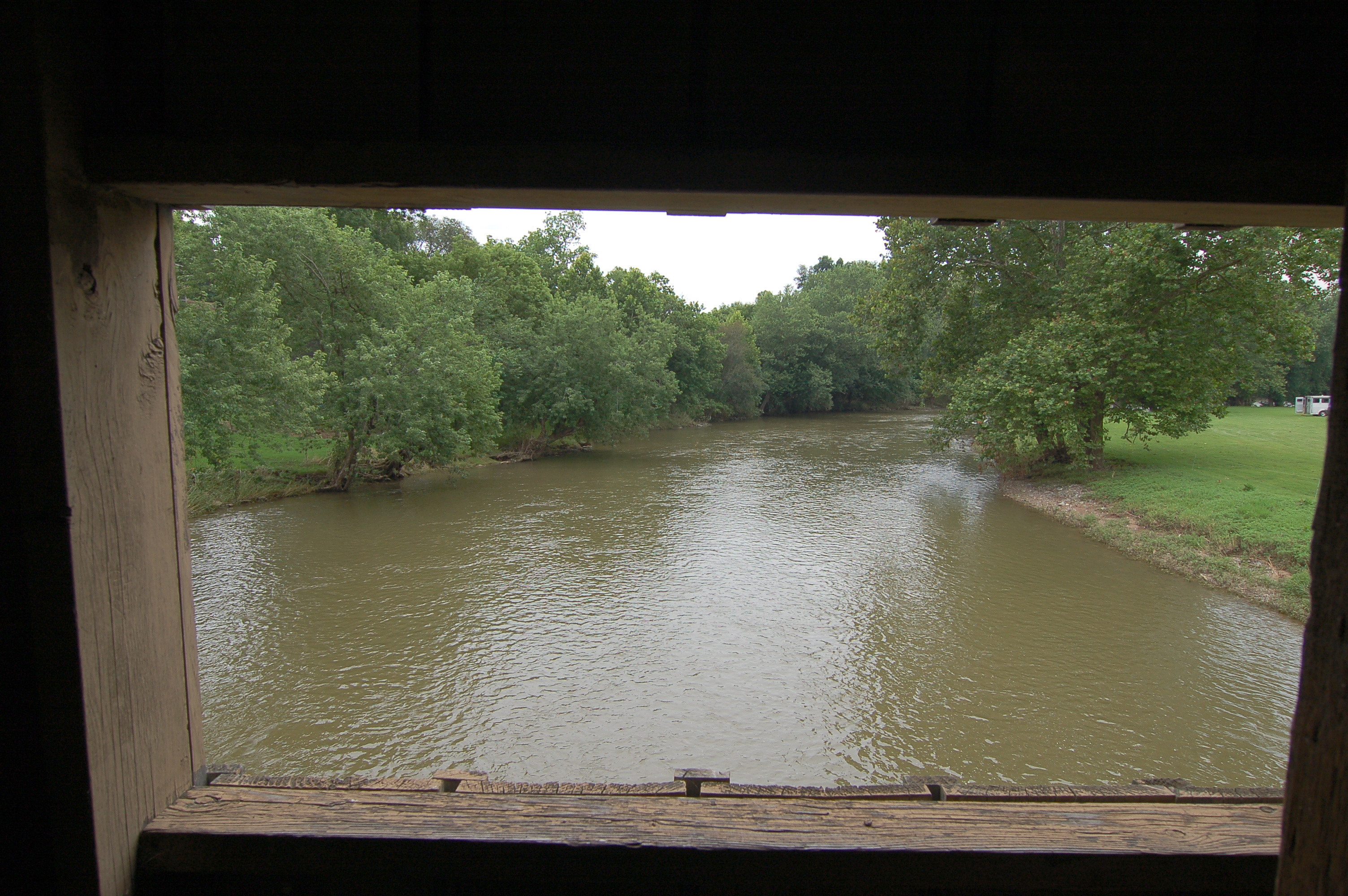
- The Conestoga River as seen from the inside of Hunsecker's Mill Covered Bridge in Lancaster County
- Native name: Kanneschtooge Rewwer (Pennsylvania German)

Physical characteristics
- Source
  - location: State Game Lands 52, Lancaster and Berks County, Pennsylvania
  - coordinates: 40°10′47″N 75°56′32″W
  - elevation: 800 ft (240 m)
- Mouth
  - location: Susquehanna River, Safe Harbor, Lancaster County, Pennsylvania
  - coordinates: 39°55′31″N 76°23′3″W
  - elevation: 170 ft (52 m)
- Length: 61.6 mi (99.1 km)
- Basin size: 491 mi^{2} (1,270 km^{2})
- Discharge
  - average: 670 cubic feet per second (19 m^{3}/s)

Basin features
- Tributaries
  - left: Groff Creek, Mill Creek
  - right: Muddy Creek, Cocalico Creek, Lititz Run, Little Conestoga Creek

The Conestoga River (Pennsylvania German: Kanneschtooge Rewwer), also referred to as Conestoga Creek (Pennsylvania German: Kanneschtooge Grick), is a 61.6-mile-long (99.1 km) tributary of the Susquehanna River flowing through the center of Lancaster County, Pennsylvania, United States.

== Geography ==
Its headwaters rise mostly in southern Berks County and northeastern Lancaster County, in an area known as "Bortz's Swamp" or "Penngall Field" (a small area rises in Chester County). The East Branch and West Branch of the Conestoga join to form the main river just north of Morgantown, and the stream flows from northeast to southwest for more than 60 miles (97 km), passing close to the center of Lancaster and ending at Safe Harbor along the Susquehanna River, approximately 16 miles (26 km) north of the Pennsylvania–Maryland state line.

The principal tributaries of the Conestoga River are Cocalico Creek, Mill Creek, and Little Conestoga Creek; they drain into the Conestoga River watershed in the order listed. The Conestoga River and its principal tributaries comprise approximately 114 stream miles, and they drain a watershed area of approximately 217 square miles (560 km^{2}) if the main stream is alone considered, rising to 491 square miles (1,270 km^{2}) when the Cocalico, Mill, and Little Conestoga Creek watersheds are also included.

== History ==
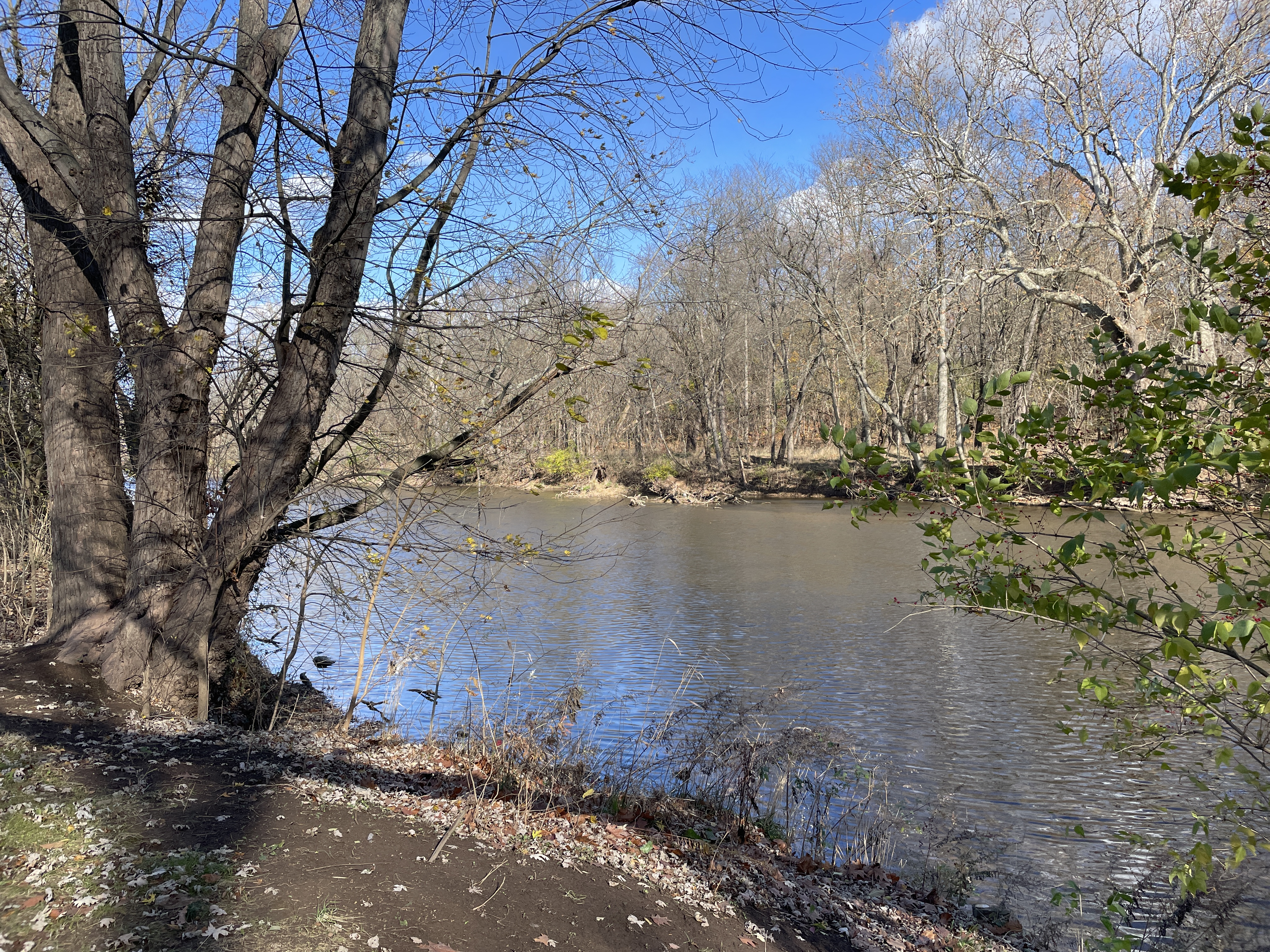
Conestoga River in Lancaster

The stream was named after the Iroquoian-speaking Susquehannock people. In the eighteenth century, British colonists in Pennsylvania called them the Conestoga, referring to the river, and to the village the Susquehannock established about 1690. The name may be based on the Mohawk word tekanastoge, meaning "place of the upright pole." Conestoga may also be the anglicized form of Gandastogue which is possibly the closest to what the Susquehannock called themselves.

An earlier Susquehannock palisaded village known as the Roberts Farm Site (36LA1) had been located nearby on a knoll above the Conestoga River and was occupied from c. 1625 to c. 1645.

For several decades Conestoga Town was important fur trading center, and a meeting place for negotiations between Pennsylvania and various Indigenous groups. Its importance, however, waned as the focus of the fur trade moved westwards. The population declined due to out-migration, and the remaining Conestoga became increasing impoverished and dependent on the Pennsylvania government, who occasionally provided clothing and provisions.

By 1763, only seven men, five women and eight children lived in Conestoga Town. In December of that year, the Paxton Boys, in response to raids by the Lenape and Shawnee, attacked Conestoga Town in the mistaken belief that the inhabitants were aiding and abetting the attacks. The Paxton Boys slaughtered the six Conestoga they found there, and burned the settlement to the ground. Fourteen of the Conestoga had been absent from the village and were given shelter in the Lancaster workhouse. Two weeks later, however, the Paxton Boys broke into the workhouse and slaughtered the remaining Conestoga including woman and children.

Robert Fulton’s early experiments to perfect the first commercial steamboat occurred on the Conestoga River. In the 19th century the name of the river gained wider recognition with the spread of the Conestoga wagon, first built in and named after this valley. The wagon assisted the transportation of freight throughout the East, and later was adapted to help transport goods to the western frontier of the United States. So many cigars were made in the watershed in the late 19th century that a local cigar named the Conestoga became known as a "stogie" throughout the United States.

In the early 19th century, it was possible to travel by boat to Lancaster, Pennsylvania, from Chesapeake Bay through a system of locks. Though the Conestoga is smaller than most streams generally designated a river, local boosterism in the late 19th century insisted that any stream holding scheduled commercial transport should be called a river. Steamboat service to a local amusement park barely qualified, but the designation caught on. The name "Conestoga" has also been applied to the Conestoga Rocket, a rocket produced from LGM-30 Minuteman parts and launched from Matagorda Island, the freighter Conestoga, which is a popular diving wreck in the Thousand Islands, the C-93 Conestoga cargo aircraft, and, in Star Trek: Enterprise, the name of the starship used in the failed first attempt at deep space colonization.

== Watershed ==
Land use along the stream has been traditionally agricultural, though spreading urbanization has affected the stream with erosion problems. Though scenic, the Conestoga River is impaired from nitrogen and phosphorus pollution, mostly runoff from animal waste and excessive commercial fertilizer. Other pollution sources are sediments from intense cropping, development, and urban runoff. The stream flows through a pastoral landscape farmed extensively by Pennsylvania German farmers and along the eastern and southern outskirts of the city of Lancaster. Many covered bridges span its banks. Northeast of Lancaster city are many Old Order Amish and Old Order Mennonite farms; horse and carriage traffic frequents local roads. Many small dams impound its waters, most of them built long ago to power mills or generate electricity. Most dams are in disrepair and have been abandoned, though there is an active movement to remove as many as possible. Seven were removed between 1996 and 1999.

== Crossings ==
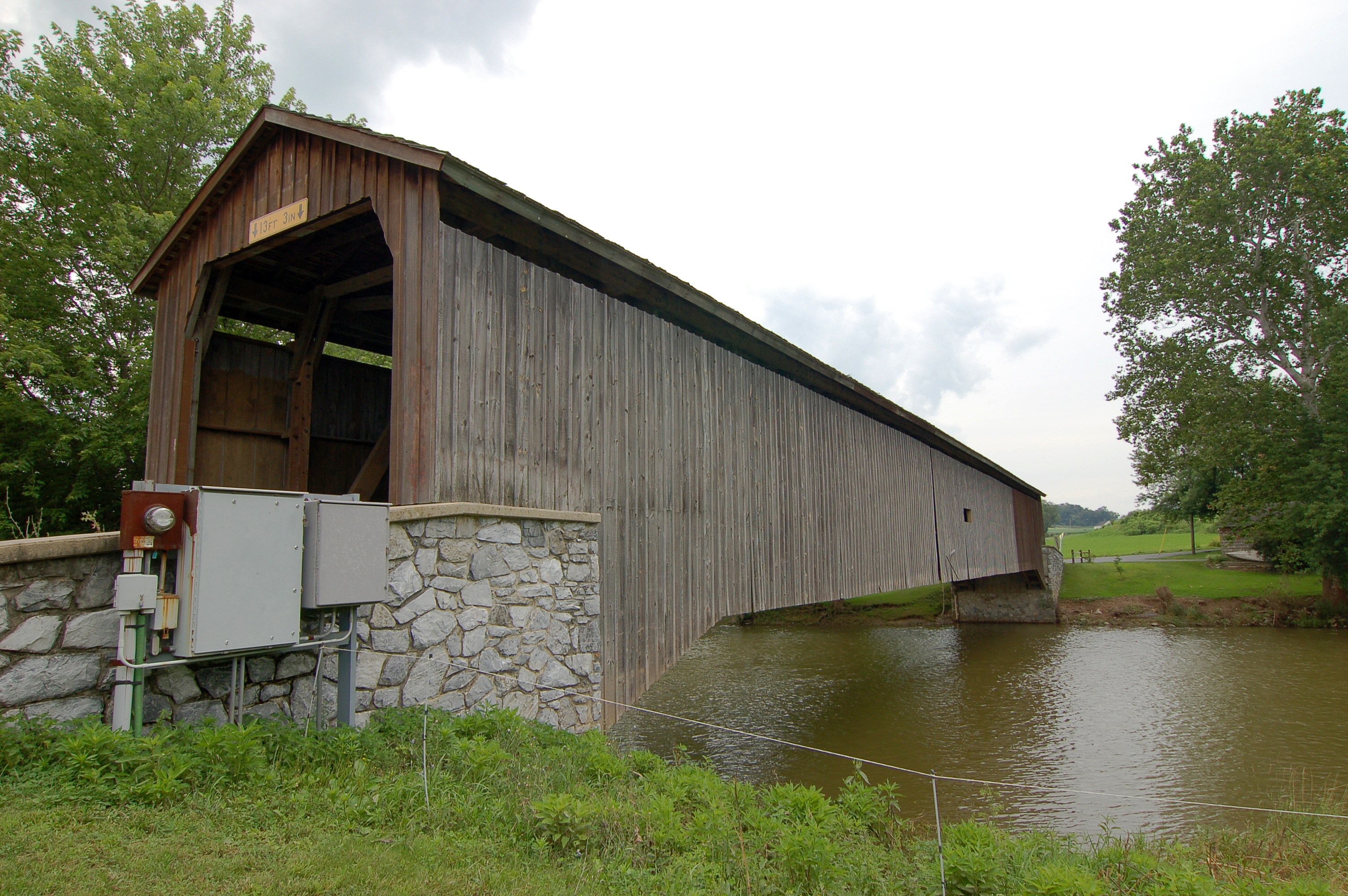
Hunsecker's Mill Covered Bridge

Covered bridges

- Hunsecker's Mill Covered Bridge
- Pinetown Bushong's Mill Covered Bridge
- Pool Forge Covered Bridge
- Kurtz's Mill Covered Bridge , spanned the Conestoga River before it was moved to a new location
- Zook's Mill Covered Bridge , spans Cocalico Creek just upstream from its confluence with the Conestoga
- Bitzer's Mill Covered Bridge
- Weaver's Mill Covered Bridge
- Pool Forge Covered Bridge

Other

- Safe Harbor Bridge, of the Enola Low Grade
- Conestoga Creek Viaduct, a stone arch railroad bridge
- Bridge in West Earl Township, a concrete bridge
- Weaverland Bridge, a concrete bowstring arch truss

== See also ==
- List of crossings of the Conestoga River
- List of rivers of Pennsylvania
- Conestogo River in Ontario and named after Conestoga River
