= Frank H. Shaw =

American civil engineer

- Born: Weymouth
- Died: May 13, 1950; West Chester
- Occupation: Civil engineer
- Works: Bridge in West Earl Township

Frank Harold Shaw (1882 – May 14, 1950) was an American civil engineer notable for designing bridges and water supply infrastructure in Lancaster County, Pennsylvania. Two water towers that he designed, affectionately named "George and Martha" by local residents, were landmarks on the Lancaster skyline until their demolition in 1996.

== Projects ==
- 1916 Big Chickies Bridge
- 1916 Weaverland Bridge (Quarry Road Bridge)
- 1917 Bridge in West Earl Township (Big Conestoga Creek Bridge No. 12)
- 1925 Lancaster Water Tower at Structurae. Retrieved 2009-10-16.
- 1932 Lancaster Water Tower at Structurae. Retrieved 2009-10-16.
