= Safe Harbor, Pennsylvania =

Unincorporated community in Pennsylvania, US

- Unincorporated community
- Location within the U.S. state of Pennsylvania Safe Harbor (the United States)
- Coordinates: 39°55′48″N 76°22′46″W
- Country: United States
- State: Pennsylvania
- County: Lancaster
- Township: Conestoga
- Time zone: UTC-5 (Eastern (EST))
  - Summer (DST): UTC-4 (EDT)

Safe Harbor is an unincorporated community located within Conestoga Township in Lancaster County, Pennsylvania, United States.

The general location was an early staging area for Native American tribes traversing the Susquehanna River from the settlements surrounding Conestoga and present day Manor Township. The "Harbor" is an inlet where the Conestoga River from the rest of Lancaster County joins with the Susquehanna River proper, and was known for its plentiful bounty of fish and wildlife that sustained the Conestoga Native Americans for centuries.

Safe Harbor and the nearby community of Conestoga were in the national media spotlight in 2001, when President George W. Bush held a photo opportunity at the Safe Harbor Dam power station.

The Safe Harbor Park and the Safe Harbor Arboretum are also located within the tiny community.

== Other ==
- Safe Harbor Trestle
