= Coventry (disambiguation) =

Coventry is a city in the West Midlands, England.

Coventry may also refer to:

== Places ==
=== United Kingdom ===
- Coventry (UK Parliament constituency), 1298–1945

=== United States ===
- Coventry, Connecticut
- Coventry, New York
- Coventry, Rhode Island
- Coventry, Vermont, a New England town
  - Coventry (CDP), Vermont, the main village in the town
- Coventry Township, Ohio
- Coventry Village, a commercial district in Cleveland Heights, Ohio

== Military ==
- HMS Coventry, names of several former warships of the Royal Navy
- Coventry armoured car, a British four-wheel-drive armoured fighting vehicle

== Arts and entertainment ==
- "Coventry Carol", a Christmas carol dating from the 16th century
- Coventry (Phish festival), a 2004 Phish music festival
- "Coventry" (short story), a short story by Robert A. Heinlein
- Coventry, a fictional location in the movie Twitches
- Sergeant Coventry, a local police officer in the Sherlock Holmes' short story Thor Bridge

== People ==
- Angela Coventry, Australian philosopher
- Charles Coventry (disambiguation)
- Francis Coventry (1725–c.1754), English satirist
- Fred Coventry (1905–1995), New Zealand artist
- George Coventry, 3rd Baron Coventry (1628–1680)
- George Coventry, 6th Earl of Coventry (1722–1809)
- George Coventry, 9th Earl of Coventry (1838–1930)
- Gertrude Mary Coventry (1886–1964), Scottish painter
- Gordon Coventry (1901–1968), Australian rules footballer
- Kirsty Coventry (born 1983), Zimbabwean swimmer, world record holder, and current International Olympic Committee president
- Paul Coventry (born 1952), English rugby league footballer of the 1970s and 1980s
- Robert McGowan Coventry (1855–1941), Scottish painter
- Syd Coventry (1899–1976), Australian rules footballer
- Thomas Coventry, 1st Baron Coventry (1578–1640)
- Thomas Coventry, 1st Earl of Coventry (c.1629–1699)
- William Coventry, 5th Earl of Coventry (c.1676–1751)
- Coventry Patmore (1823–1896), English poet and critic

== Other uses ==
- 3009 Coventry, an asteroid
- Coventry Health Care, a managed health care company in the US
- Coventry (horse), American racehorse
- Coventry Building Society, financial institution in the UK
- Coventry City F.C., a football club who compete in the English league system

== See also ==
- Coventry Climax, a Coventry-based forklift truck, fire pump, and speciality engine manufacturer
- Coventry Blitz, the 1940 German bombing of Coventry, England
- Send to Coventry, an English idiom meaning to deliberately ostracise someone
- South Coventry (disambiguation)
- East Coventry Township, Pennsylvania, US
- North Coventry Township, Pennsylvania, US
- South Coventry Township, Pennsylvania, US
