= Delaware River and Lancaster Railroad =

Overview
- Locale: Pennsylvania
- Dates of operation: 1890–1893
- Successor: abandoned

Technical
- Track gauge: 4 ft 8 1/2 in (1,435 mm) standard gauge

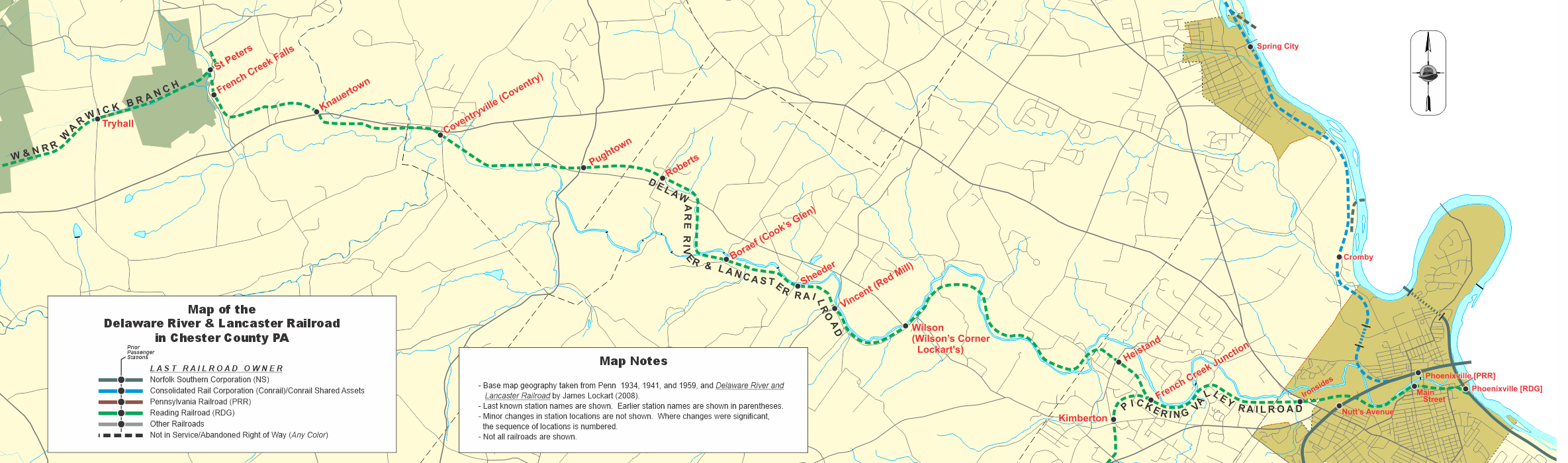
The alignment of the Delaware River & Lancaster Railroad

The Delaware River and Lancaster Railroad, known locally as the Sowbelly Railroad and sometimes called the Delaware River, Phoenixville and Lancaster Railroad, was a short-lived rail line along French Creek between Kimberton and St. Peters in Chester County, Pennsylvania.

== Planned interstate line ==
The railroad was originally chartered on March 24, 1868, to run from a railroad bridge crossing the Delaware River at Point Pleasant, Pennsylvania, via Phoenixville, Pennsylvania to Lancaster, Pennsylvania, as part of a more direct route between New York City and Lancaster. The charter required the railroad to begin construction within two years of the passage of the act. A supplemental act of February 10, 1870 extended that time by a further three years. The company was not organized until October 12, 1871. It received a charter supplement on April 4, 1872, relieving it of the need to pass through Phoenixville. A token amount of work to preserve the company's charter was done in the winter of 1872–3, when George W. Crane graded about 600 yards (550 m) of the line on the Christian Mast farm, on the Chester-Berks county border west of Springfield (Elverson). A contract with Bush & Co., of New York, was made in 1875, but no work was carried out under it. The depressed conditions after the Panic of 1873 were not favorable to speculative railroad projects. By 1883, the railroad was still unbuilt; the building contractor refused to construct it until all of the proposed right of way had been secured. Not for another five years was sufficient money raised (and then only enough for a line extending from Phoenixville to Saint Peters, and possibly from there to Lancaster).

== Local railroad ==
Control of the company eventually came into the hands of Davis Knauer, a successful local entrepreneur in northern Chester County. In the spring of 1889, contracts were let for construction of a short portion of the route, between a connection with the Pickering Valley Railroad (a Reading subsidiary) near Kimberton, at a point called French Creek Junction, to St. Peters, where it connected with the Warwick Branch of the Wilmington and Northern Railroad. Track was laid in 1890 and the first train ran on November 10. The line largely followed French Creek west of Kimberton, passing through Wilsons Corner, Sheeder, Pughtown, Coventryville, and Knauertown before reaching St. Peters, where it connected with the Wilmington and Northern in a switchback via the spur serving Knauer's black granite quarries.

The line was very lightly graded and built, and its many undulations gave rise to the local sobriquet of "Sowbelly Railroad". Knauer intended it as another outlet for black granite from his quarries, and to attract residents of Phoenixville to make outings to his hotel in St. Peters. However, it was operated by the Wilmington and Northern, using a leased Reading engine. Although the railroad projected a 30-mile (48 km) extension into Lancaster in 1893, it narrowly escaped a sheriff's sale in May when its president paid off the damages for which it had been attached. Traffic was low, and service ended on December 1, 1893. The rails remained in place for about a year. In July 1894, the Wilmington and Northern reportedly leased the railroad again and sent out work gangs to put the line back in repair. However, service was never restored. The company entered receivership in the spring of 1895. It was dissolved in 1895 and the rails removed to be sold to John T. Dyer, a railroad contractor and quarryman. The timbers were used for a number of local projects. By 1900, only the ballast (gravel) and some concrete abutments remained.

== Stations ==
The stations on the railroad were as follows (DR&LRR Timetable effective November 15, 1891):

| Station Name | Mile | km | Notes |
| French Creek Junction | 0.0 | 0.0 | Connection with Pickering Valley Railroad |
| Heistand | 0.5 | 0.8 | Place name is "Hiestand" but misspelled in DR&L timetable |
| Wilson | 3.7 | 6.0 | Water tank and siding. Also called Wilson's Corner and Lockart's. |
| Vincent | 4.6 | 7.4 | Also called Red Hill |
| Sheeder | 5.1 | 8.2 | |
| Boraef | 5.8 | 9.3 | |
| Roberts | 6.7 | 10.8 | |
| Pughtown | 7.5 | 12.1 | |
| Coventryville | 9.7 | 15.6 | Sidings to graphite mines, Chrisman's gristmill |
| Knauertown | 10.8 | 17.4 | |
| French Creek Falls | 11.7 | 18.8 | |
| Saint Peters | 12.0 | 19.3 | Connection with Warwick Branch. Also called St Peter's |
