= PA23 =

PA23 may refer to:

- Pennsylvania's 23rd congressional district
- Pennsylvania Route 23
- Piper Aztec light aircraft
