= Coventry Festival =

Coventry Festival may refer to:

- Coventry (Phish festival), 2004 music festival in Coventry, Vermont, USA
- Godiva Festival, annual music festival in Coventry, England
- Coventry UK City of Culture 2021

== See also ==
- Coventry Mystery Plays, medieval religious pageant
- Coventry (disambiguation)
