= Michener =

Michener may refer to:

== People and characters ==
=== People with the surname ===
- Charles Duncan Michener (1918–2015), American entomologist
- Earl C. Michener (1876–1957), American politician
- Edward Michener (1869–1947), Canadian politician
- James A. Michener (1907–1997), American novelist
- Louis T. Michener (1848-1828), American politician
- Norah Michener (1902–1987), doctorate in philosophy and wife of Roland Michener
- Roland Michener (1900–1991), Governor General of Canada from 1967 to 1974

=== Fictional characters ===
- Jeffrey Michener, President of the United States; a fictional character from the 2010s TV show The Last Ship; see List of The Last Ship episodes

== Places ==
- James A. Michener Art Museum, Doylestown, Pennsylvania, USA
- Nathan Michener House, South Coventry, Chester, Pennsylvania, USA
- Michener Center for Writers, University of Texas at Austin, Austin, Texas, USA
- Mount Michener, Alberta, Canada; a mountain named after Roland Michener
- Michener House Museum and Archives, Lacombe, Alberta, Canada; of Roland Michener
- The Michener Institute, Toronto, Ontario, Canada; a health education institute
- Roland Michener School, College Park East, Saskatoon, Saskatchewan, Canada

== Awards and honours ==
- Michener Award, a journalism award founded by Roland Michener
- Wendy Michener Award, Canadian film award

== Other uses ==
- Lang Michener, a Canadian law firm
- Michener-Copernicus Fellowship, a literary fellowship
- USS Jeffrey Michener, a fictional ship from the 2010s TV show The Last Ship

== See also ==
- James A. Michener's Texas, a 1994 TV miniseries
- James A. Michener's Space, a 1985 TV miniseries
