= South Coventry =

South Coventry may refer to the following places in the United States:

- South Coventry (CDP), Connecticut
  - South Coventry Historic District
- South Coventry Township, Pennsylvania

== See also ==
- Coventry (disambiguation)
- Coventry South, a UK Parliament constituency
