= Simon Meredith House =

Historic house in Pennsylvania, United States

- U.S. National Register of Historic Places
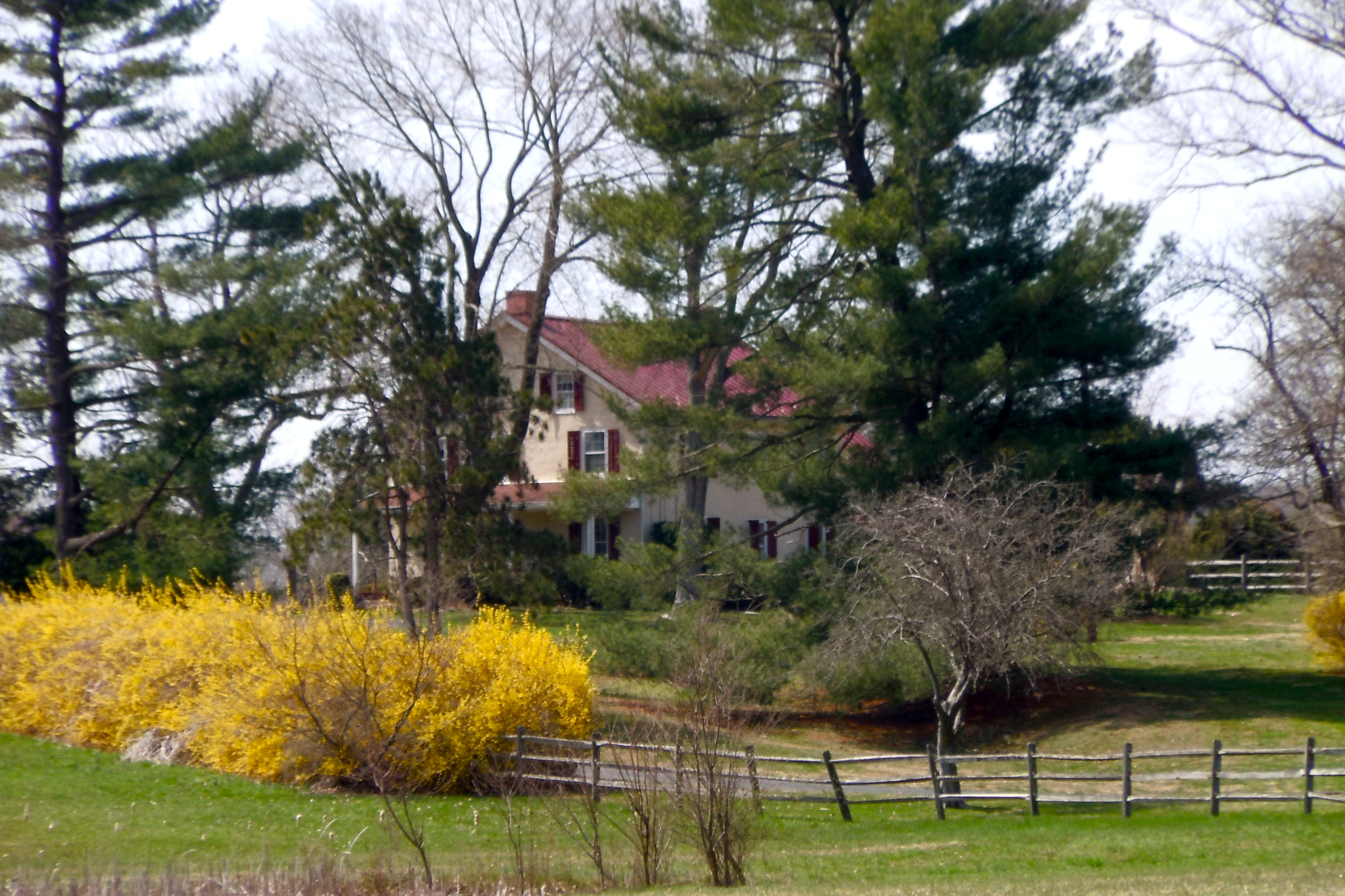
- Simon Meredith House, April 2011

- Location within Pennsylvania Location within the United States
- Location: 0.5 miles (0.80 km) west of Pughtown on Pughtown Road, South Coventry Township, Pennsylvania
- Coordinates: 40°10′12″N 75°40′39″W
- Area: 1 acre (0.40 ha)
- Built: c. 1720
- Architectural style: Federal
- NRHP reference No.: 74001772
- Added to NRHP: December 16, 1974

The Simon Meredith House is an historic home that is located in South Coventry Township, Chester County, Pennsylvania, United States.

The house was added to the National Register of Historic Places in 1974.

== History and architectural features ==
This historic structure was built in two major phases. The oldest section was built in 1717. It is a 2 1/2-story, two-bay, stuccoed fieldstone structure with a gable roof. The larger Federal-style addition was made on the east end. It is 2 1/2 stories and four bays wide, and was built using stucco-over-stone construction. The house features a full-width, one-story porch.
