= Townsend House (Pughtown, Pennsylvania) =

Historic house in Pennsylvania, United States

- U.S. National Register of Historic Places
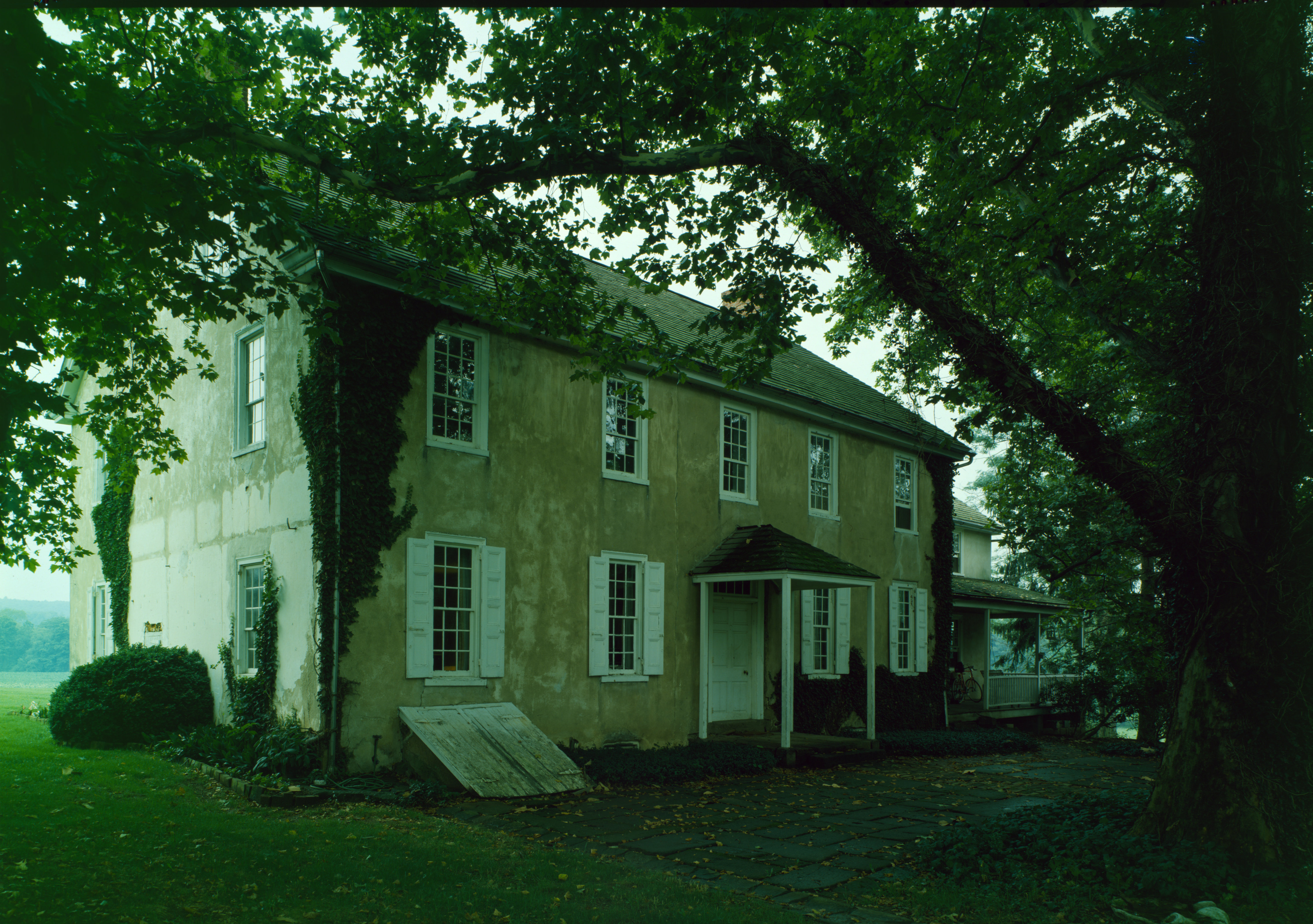
- Lundale Farmhouse, HABS Photo

- Location within Pennsylvania Location within the United States
- Location: Southwest of Pughtown off Pennsylvania Route 100, South Coventry Township, Pennsylvania
- Coordinates: 40°9′51″N 75°40′21″W
- Built: 1796
- Architect: Townsend, Samuel
- NRHP reference No.: 74001773
- Added to NRHP: December 16, 1974

The Townsend House, also known as Lundale Farm, is an historic home that is located near Pughtown in South Coventry Township, Chester County, Pennsylvania, United States.

The house was added to the National Register of Historic Places in 1974.

== History and architectural features ==
This historic residence was built in three phases. The oldest section dates to 1796, with additions made during the early nineteenth century and in 1950. The main house was built during the first two phases and is a 2 1/2-story, five-bay, random fieldstone structure that is coated in stucco. It has a gable roof and a brick chimney at the west gable end. The 1950 addition is a 2 1/2-story structure attached at the east end. Also located on the property is a stone springhouse that dates to the early eighteenth century.

== Gallery ==
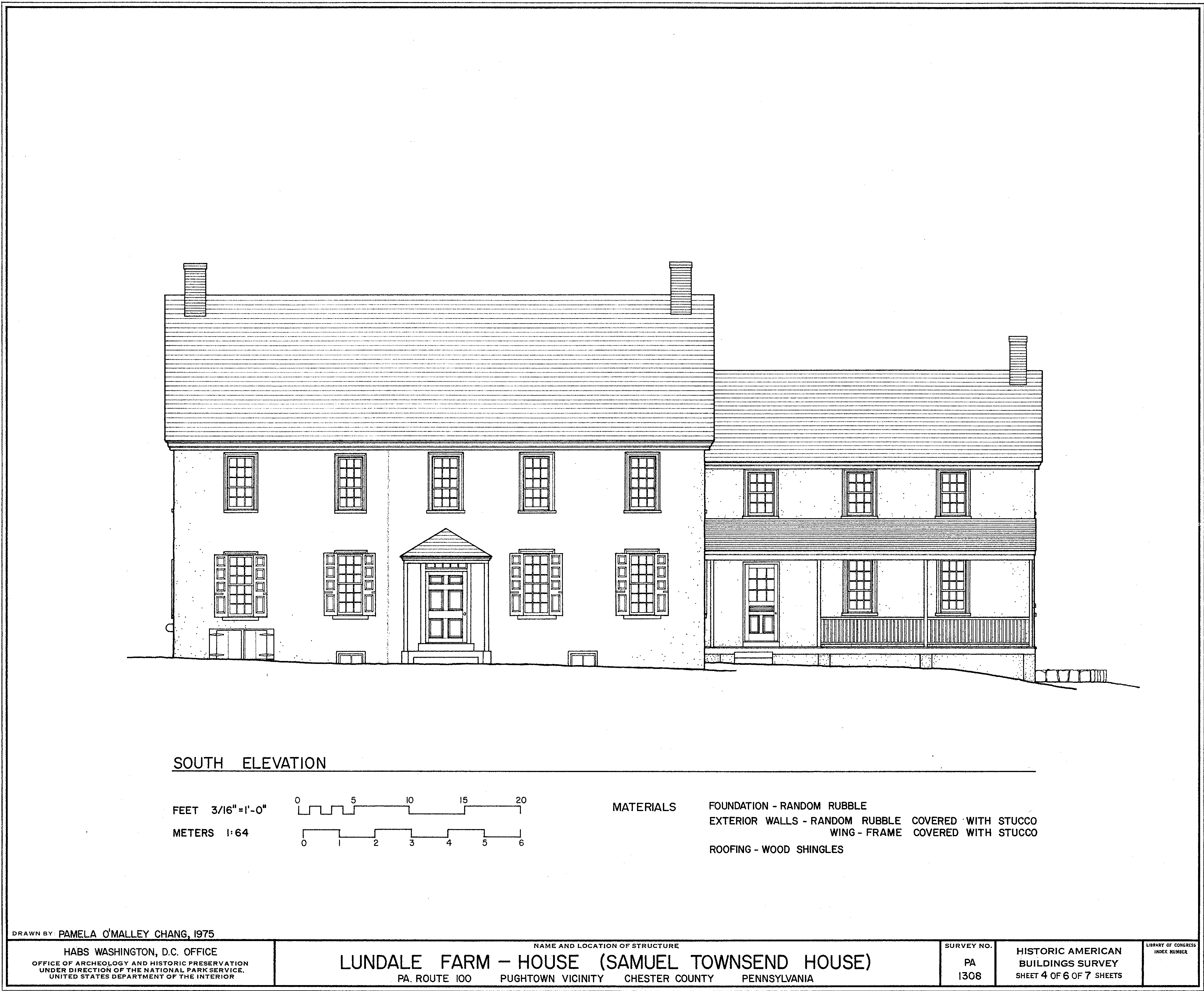
HABS Drawing, 1975
