= Edward Robertson (Semitist) =

Scottish professor, linguist, and librarian (1879–1964)

- Born: 10 October 1879; Cameron, Fife
- Died: 29 April 1964 (aged 84)
- Occupations: Academic and librarian

Edward Robertson (10 October 1879 – 29 April 1964) was a Scottish academic, Professor of Semitic Studies at the Victoria University of Manchester and afterwards Librarian of the John Rylands Library, Manchester.

== Biography ==
Robertson was born in Cameron, Fife, the son of Helen (née Angus) and John Robertson. He attended the University of St Andrews (1897–1904), earning his M.A. in 1901 and B.D. in 1904. He spent several years abroad in Germany and Syria before returning in 1905 to St Andrews as an assistant professor of Hebrew language, and earned his D.Litt. in 1913. From 1913–21, he taught Arabic at the University of Edinburgh before becoming Professor of Semitic Studies at University College, Bangor. In 1934, he was appointed to the chair of Semitic Studies at the Victoria University of Manchester.

In 1945, he retired from the university and became Professor Emeritus of Semitic Studies. In 1949, he came out of retirement when he was appointed Librarian of the John Rylands Library, Manchester. He reorganized the library administration into departments headed by a Registrar, a Keeper of Printed Books and a Keeper of Manuscripts. During his tenure an appeal for £100,000 was made to strengthen the library's financial situation. In 1962 he resigned as Librarian of the John Rylands Library and emigrated to Canada, when eighty-two years of age.

In 1948, Robertson was president of the Society for Old Testament Study. Professor Robertson was awarded D.D. degrees by the universities of St Andrews and Wales, a D.Lit. degree and the honorary degree of LL.D. by the Victoria University of Manchester. He was born at Cameron, Fife, and in 1915 married the artist Gertrude Mary Coventry, by whom he had a son and two daughters. At the time of his death on 29 April 1964 he resided at Hudson, Province of Quebec; his son had predeceased him. "His research work was done principally ... in the rather recondite field of Samaritan studies, to which he made memorable contributions, but his interests and competence as a scholar were very wide ... Robertson was an admirable teacher ... meticulous in his standards, but tolerant, patient, and always approachable ..."; from the resolution adopted by the Council and Senate of the Victoria University of Manchester after his death.

== Publications (selected) ==
- 1938: Catalogue of the Samaritan Manuscripts in the John Rylands Library, Manchester. Manchester: Manchester University Press
- 1950: The Old Testament Problem: a re-investigation together with two other essays. Manchester: Manchester University Press
- 1952: Mishnah Horayoth: its history and exposition; critical and explanatory notes by P. R. Weis; the text translated by Edward Robertson. Manchester: Manchester University Press
- 1962: Catalogue of the Samaritan Manuscripts in the John Rylands Library, Manchester; vol. 2: the Gaster Manuscripts. Manchester: Manchester University Press
