= Stephen Meredith House =

Historic house in Pennsylvania, United States

- U.S. National Register of Historic Places
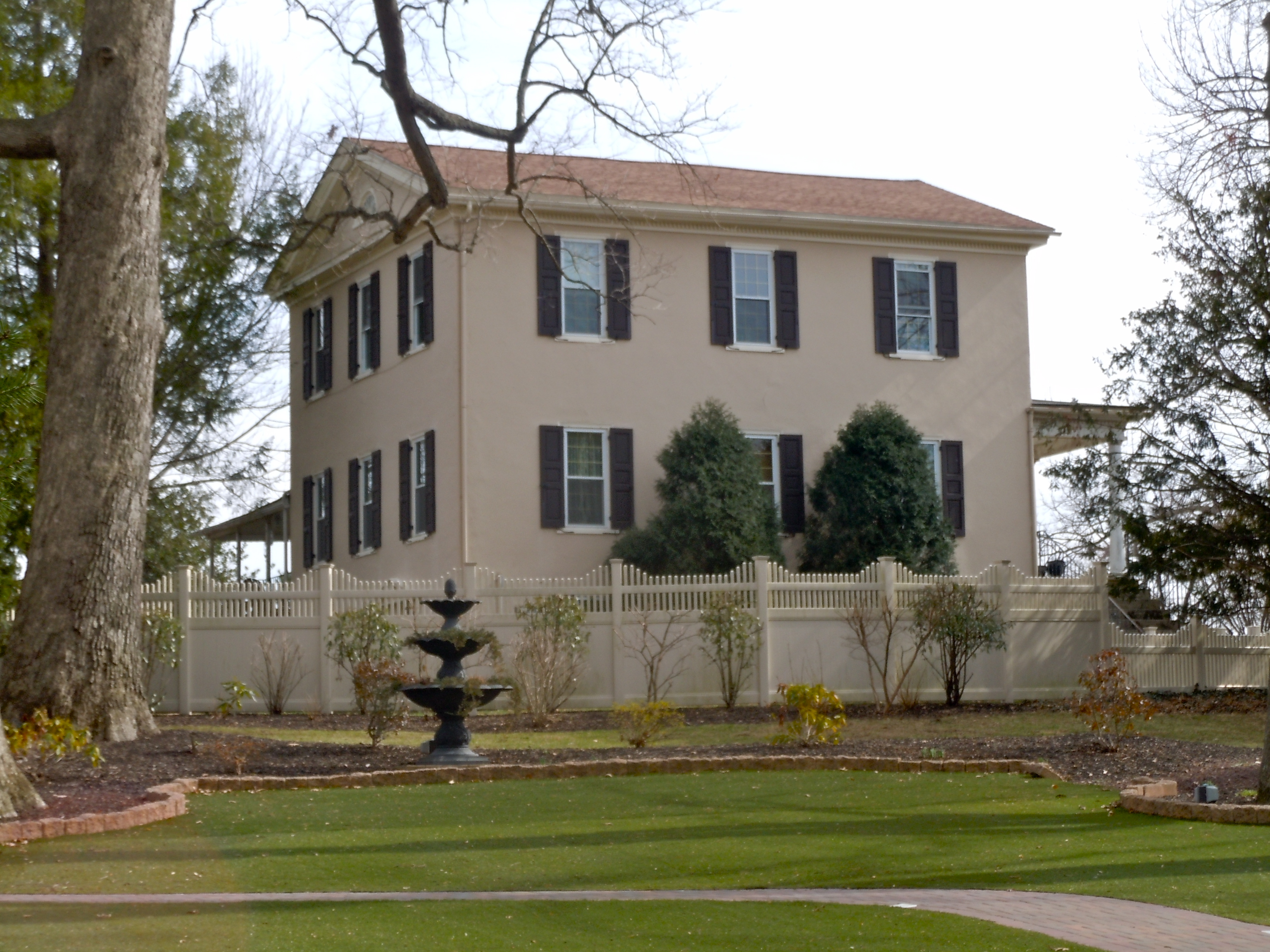
- Stephen Meredith House, March 2011

- Location within Pennsylvania Location within the United States
- Location: Pennsylvania Route 100 halfway between Bucktown and Pughtown, South Coventry Township, Pennsylvania
- Coordinates: 40°10′17″N 75°39′41″W
- Area: 10 acres (4.0 ha)
- Built: 1844, c. 1785
- Architectural style: Greek Revival
- NRHP reference No.: 93000355
- Added to NRHP: April 29, 1993

The Stephen Meredith House is an historic home that is located in South Coventry Township, Chester County, Pennsylvania, United States.

The house was added to the National Register of Historic Places in 1993.

== History and architectural features ==
Built in 1844, this historic structure is a two-story, three-bay by four-bay, stone dwelling that was designed in the Greek Revival style. The front facade features a pedimented portico with Doric order columns.

Also located on the property is a contributing barn that was built sometime between 1780 and 1790 and a stone arch bridge that dates to circa 1844.
