= Pennsylvania Route 23 =

State highway in Pennsylvania, US

Pennsylvania Route 23

Route information
- Maintained by PennDOT, City of Lancaster, Upper Merion Township, and Lower Merion Township
- Length: 81.144 mi (130.589 km)
- Existed: 1928–present
- Tourist routes: Conestoga Ridge Byway

Major junctions
- West end: PA 441 in Marietta
- US 222 / PA 272 in Lancaster; US 30 near Lancaster; US 322 in Blue Ball; I-176 in Morgantown; PA 10 in Morgantown; PA 100 in Pughtown; PA 113 in Phoenixville; PA 29 in Phoenixville; US 422 in King of Prussia; US 202 in Bridgeport
- East end: US 1 at the Bala Cynwyd–Philadelphia line

Location
- Country: United States
- State: Pennsylvania
- Counties: Lancaster, Berks, Chester, Montgomery

Highway system
- Pennsylvania State Route System; Interstate; US; State; Scenic; Legislative
← PA 22	→ PA 24

Pennsylvania Route 23 (PA 23) is an 81.14-mile-long (130.58 km) state highway in southeastern Pennsylvania. The route begins at PA 441 in Marietta and heads east to U.S. Route 1 (US 1) at City Avenue on the border of Lower Merion Township and Philadelphia. PA 23 begins at Marietta in Lancaster County and continues east to Lancaster, where it passes through the city on a one-way pair of streets and intersects US 222 and US 30.

East of Lancaster, the route runs through agricultural areas in Pennsylvania Dutch Country, serving Leola, New Holland, and Blue Ball, the latter location where it crosses US 322. PA 23 passes through the southern tip of Berks County and serves Morgantown, where a ramp provides access to Interstate 176 (I-176). The route runs through northern Chester County and serves Elverson, Bucktown, Phoenixville, and Valley Forge.

PA 23 continues into Montgomery County and intersects US 422 in King of Prussia and US 202 in Bridgeport. The route follows the Schuylkill River to West Conshohocken, where it has access to I-76 and I-476, before it continues southeast through Lower Merion Township to US 1, which there is running on the border between Montgomery County and Philadelphia. The portion of PA 23 between Blue Ball and west of Morgantown is designated the Conestoga Ridge Byway, a Pennsylvania Scenic Byway.

PA 23 was first designated in 1927 between US 230 in Lancaster and City Avenue on the Lower Merion Township/Philadelphia border. The route was extended east to US 30 (Girard Avenue) in West Philadelphia via Conshohocken Avenue and Belmont Avenue in the 1930s.

PA 23 was rerouted to use Gulph Road through Valley Forge Park by 1945, with PA 23 Truck designated to bypass the route to the north and east by 1950. PA 23 Alternate (PA 23 Alt.) was designated as an alternate alignment in Lower Merion Township in 1937. PA 23 was moved to its current alignment between Valley Forge and Bala Cynwyd by 1967, replacing parts of PA 363 between Valley Forge and Port Kennedy and PA 320 between Bridgeport and West Conshohocken. The alternate and truck routes were also decommissioned at this time.

The route was extended west from Lancaster to Marietta by 1970, replacing a part of PA 340; the route was also moved onto a one-way pair in Lancaster. The eastern terminus was moved to its current location in the 1980s. PA 23 was rerouted to its current alignment in the eastern part of Lancaster in 1992, bypassing New Holland Avenue.

A PA 23 freeway was proposed east of Lancaster in the 1960s, and parts of the road were built before construction stopped. The road was turned over to farmers and is known as the "Goat Path". A two-lane bypass of PA 23 east of Lancaster was later proposed before being shelved in 2010. A freeway between US 422 and US 202 in Upper Merion Township called the Schuylkill Parkway was planned in the 1960s. A small stub of the freeway in Bridgeport was built in 1972 before funding issues halted the project. Another freeway was proposed to bypass the borough of Phoenixville in the 1960s, although local opposition prevented the project from ever moving forward.

== Route description ==
=== Lancaster County ===
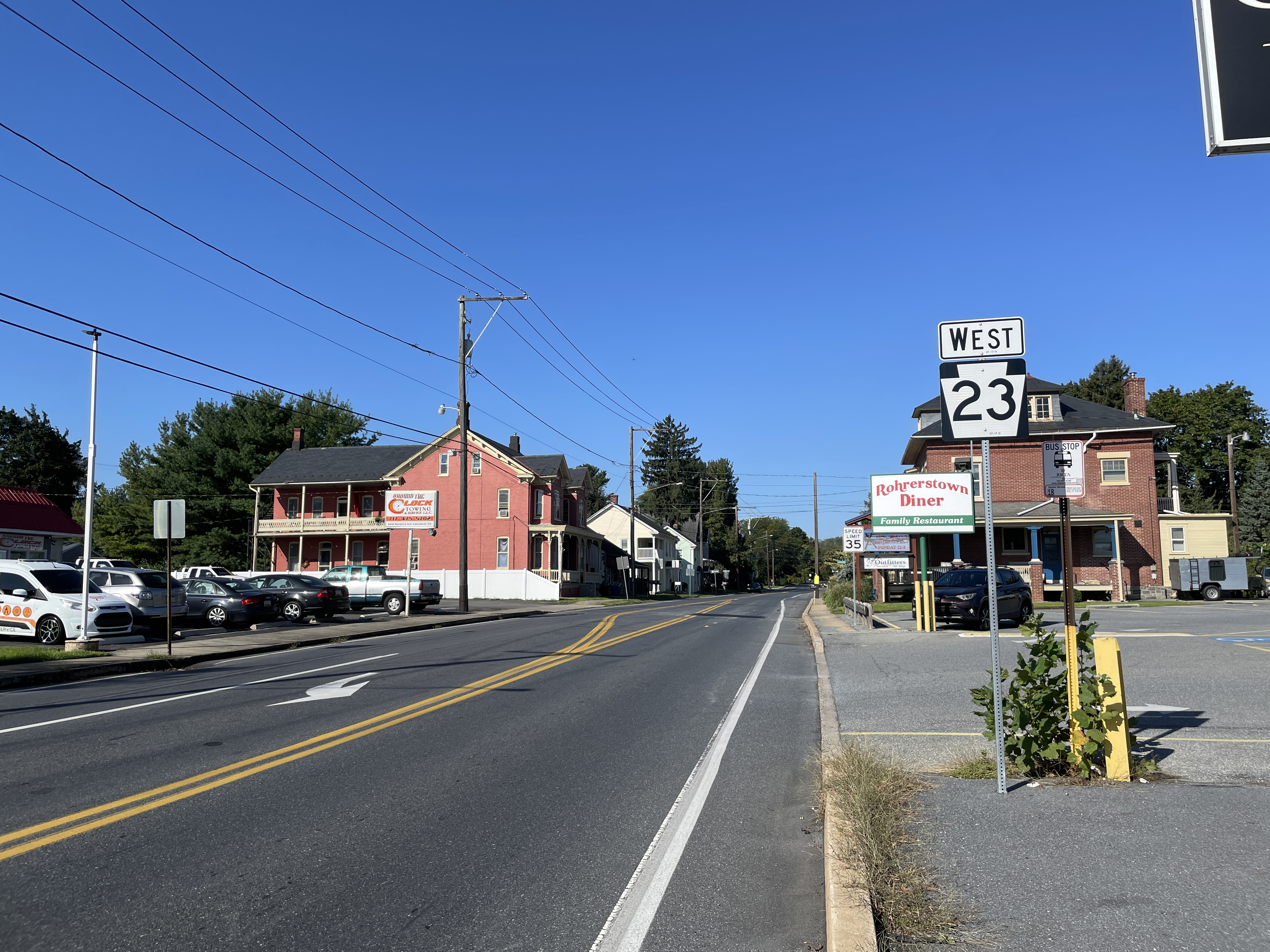
PA 23 westbound past PA 741 in East Hempfield Township

PA 23 begins at an intersection with PA 441 on the eastern edge of the borough of Marietta in Lancaster County, heading east on two-lane undivided Marietta Avenue into East Donegal Township. The road runs through a mix of farmland and trees with some residences, crossing Donegal Creek before heading across Chiques Creek into West Hempfield Township. The route continues through rural land with some housing developments as Marietta Pike, passing through the community of Silver Spring. PA 23 runs through farm fields with some residential and commercial development and crosses into East Hempfield Township at the Stony Battery Road intersection in the community of Oyster Point. The road continues through development with some farmland, coming to bridges over the US 30 freeway without an interchange and Norfolk Southern's Columbia Secondary railroad line. The route passes homes in the community of Rohrerstown and reaches an intersection with PA 741. PA 23 runs through wooded residential areas and enters Lancaster Township upon crossing Little Conestoga Creek. The route becomes Marietta Avenue, running through the community of School Lane Hills and curving to the southeast. The road passes to the north of Wheatland, the former home of 15th President James Buchanan, before it enters the city of Lancaster and becomes city-maintained.

Upon entering Lancaster, PA 23 intersects the westbound direction of PA 462 at Race Avenue. Here, the route splits into a one-way pair, with the eastbound direction of PA 23 continuing along two-way Marietta Avenue and the westbound direction of PA 23 becoming concurrent with westbound PA 462 on one-way West Walnut Street, carrying two lanes. Two blocks later, near the former UPMC Pinnacle Lancaster hospital, eastbound PA 23 splits from Marietta Avenue onto one-way eastbound West Chestnut Street, with two lanes. The route follows West Chestnut Street eastbound and West Walnut Street westbound, continuing concurrent with PA 462 westbound, passing through residential areas of the city. Eastbound PA 462 is located two blocks south of eastbound PA 23 along King Street. The route heads into the commercial downtown of Lancaster, where it intersects one-way southbound US 222/PA 272 at North Prince Street. A short distance later, PA 23 crosses one-way northbound PA 72 at North Queen Street. Past this intersection, the route becomes East Chestnut Street eastbound and East Walnut Street westbound, intersecting one-way northbound US 222/PA 272 at North Lime Street at the east end of downtown. Following this, PA 23 passes more homes and industrial establishments in the eastern part of the city. At North Broad Street, westbound PA 462 splits from westbound PA 23, and eastbound PA 23 heads northeast on Grofftown Road before the two directions of PA 23 merge a short distance later onto a four-lane expressway known as East Walnut Street, which is state-maintained. The route curves northeast through wooded areas with some nearby development, passing through a corner of Manheim Township before crossing under the Conestoga Creek Viaduct that carries Amtrak's Keystone Corridor railroad line over the route and the Conestoga River immediately to the east. The road continues north into Lancaster again before it turns northeast into Manheim Township and crosses the Conestoga River back into Lancaster. PA 23 comes to an interchange with the US 30 freeway, onto which it turns northwest for a brief wrong-way concurrency, with East Walnut Street heading northeast.

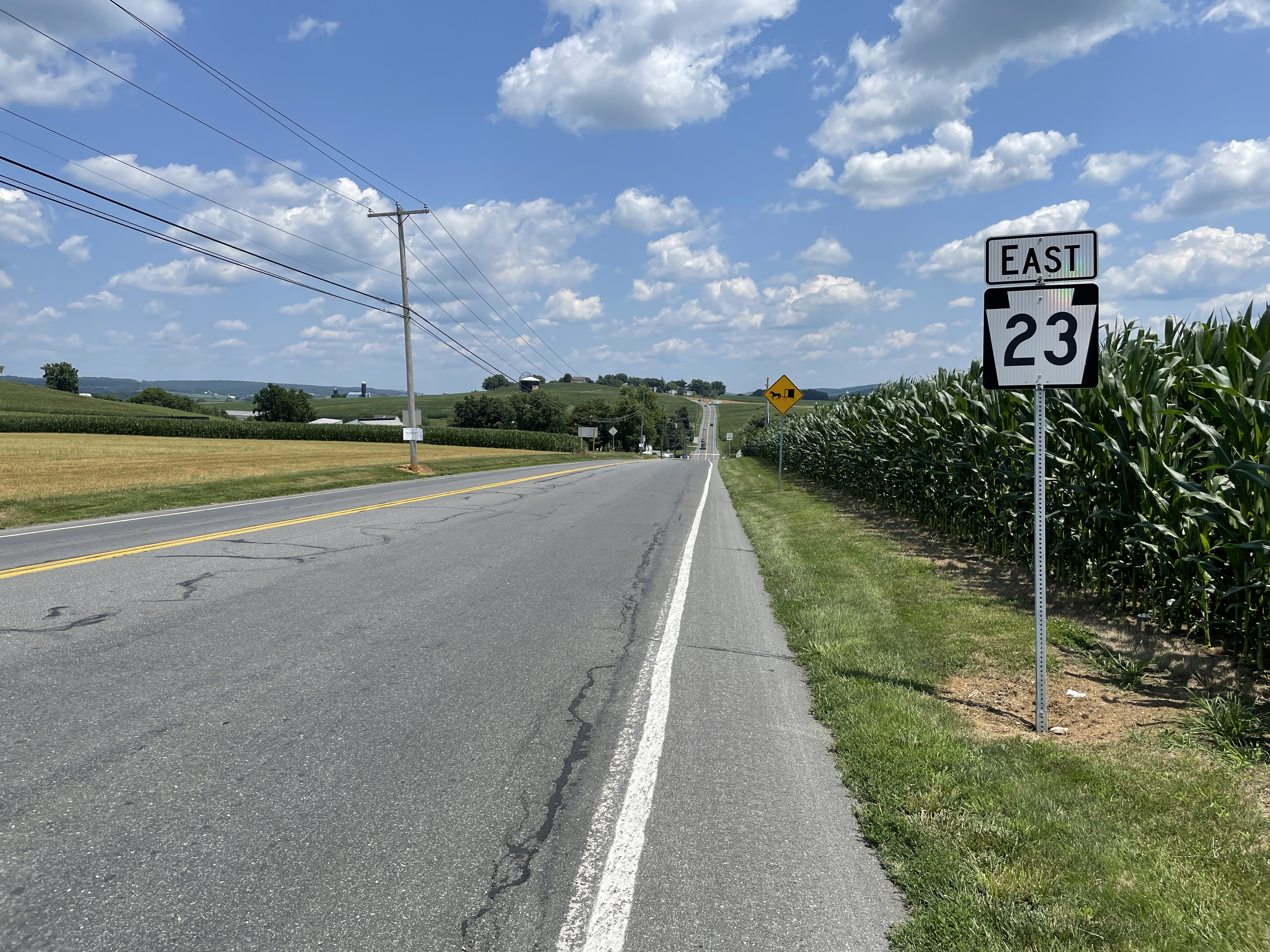
PA 23 eastbound past PA 625 in East Earl Township

PA 23 follows US 30 along a four-lane freeway, in said wrong-way concurrency, and crosses the Conestoga River into Manheim Township. After the river, PA 23 splits from US 30 at a diamond interchange and heads northeast onto New Holland Pike, a three-lane road with a center left-turn lane. The route passes through wooded residential areas to the west of the Lancaster Country Club in the community of Eden. The road narrows to two lanes and curves east to cross the Conestoga River into East Lampeter Township, passing through the community of Holland Heights. At this point, the route enters the Pennsylvania Dutch Country of eastern Lancaster County, which is home to many Amish farms. PA 23 continues into Upper Leacock Township and passes through a mix of farmland and residential and commercial development, passing north of the Lancaster County Christian School and running through the community of Geist and Leacock, where it becomes West Main Street. The route reaches the community of Leola, where PA 772 joins for a short concurrency before it splits to the southeast. The road becomes East Main Street and is lined with more homes and businesses with nearby farmland as it continues east through the community of Bareville. PA 23 forms the border between West Earl Township to the north and Upper Leacock Township to the south before it enters Earl Township in the community of Groffdale.

The road becomes West Main Street and curves northeast past residential and commercial development, crossing into the borough of New Holland. The route becomes lined with homes and passes through the commercial downtown, where it becomes East Main Street. PA 23 runs past more residences before entering commercial areas, passing to the south of Garden Spot High School and crossing back into Earl Township. The route enters East Earl Township and runs past a mix of farmland, homes, and businesses as Main Street, crossing US 322 in the community of Blue Ball. PA 23 continues east past more development and intersects PA 897, with that route joining PA 23 for a short concurrency before it heads south. Past this, PA 23 enters agricultural areas and intersects the southern terminus of PA 625. The road runs through more farmland, passing through the residential community of Goodville before it enters Caernarvon Township. The route crosses the Conestoga River and runs through Churchtown. The road curves north-northeast through more rural areas, passing north of Conestoga Christian School before coming to an intersection with PA 10. Here, PA 10 becomes concurrent with PA 23 on a three-lane road with a center left-turn lane, heading into commercial areas. The section of PA 23 in Lancaster County between US 322 and PA 10 is designated as the Conestoga Ridge Byway, a Pennsylvania Scenic Byway.

=== Berks and Chester counties ===
The road crosses into Caernarvon Township in Berks County and intersects a ramp that heads north to provide access to northbound I-176 and from southbound I-176. The two routes continue into the community of Morgantown as a two-lane road and pass homes. PA 10 splits from PA 23 by turning north onto Morgantown Road, and PA 23 continues east past more residences and some businesses. The route comes to a bridge over the Pennsylvania Turnpike (I-76) and heads south of Morgantown Airport before passing through farmland with some commercial development, coming to a junction with the western terminus of PA 401.

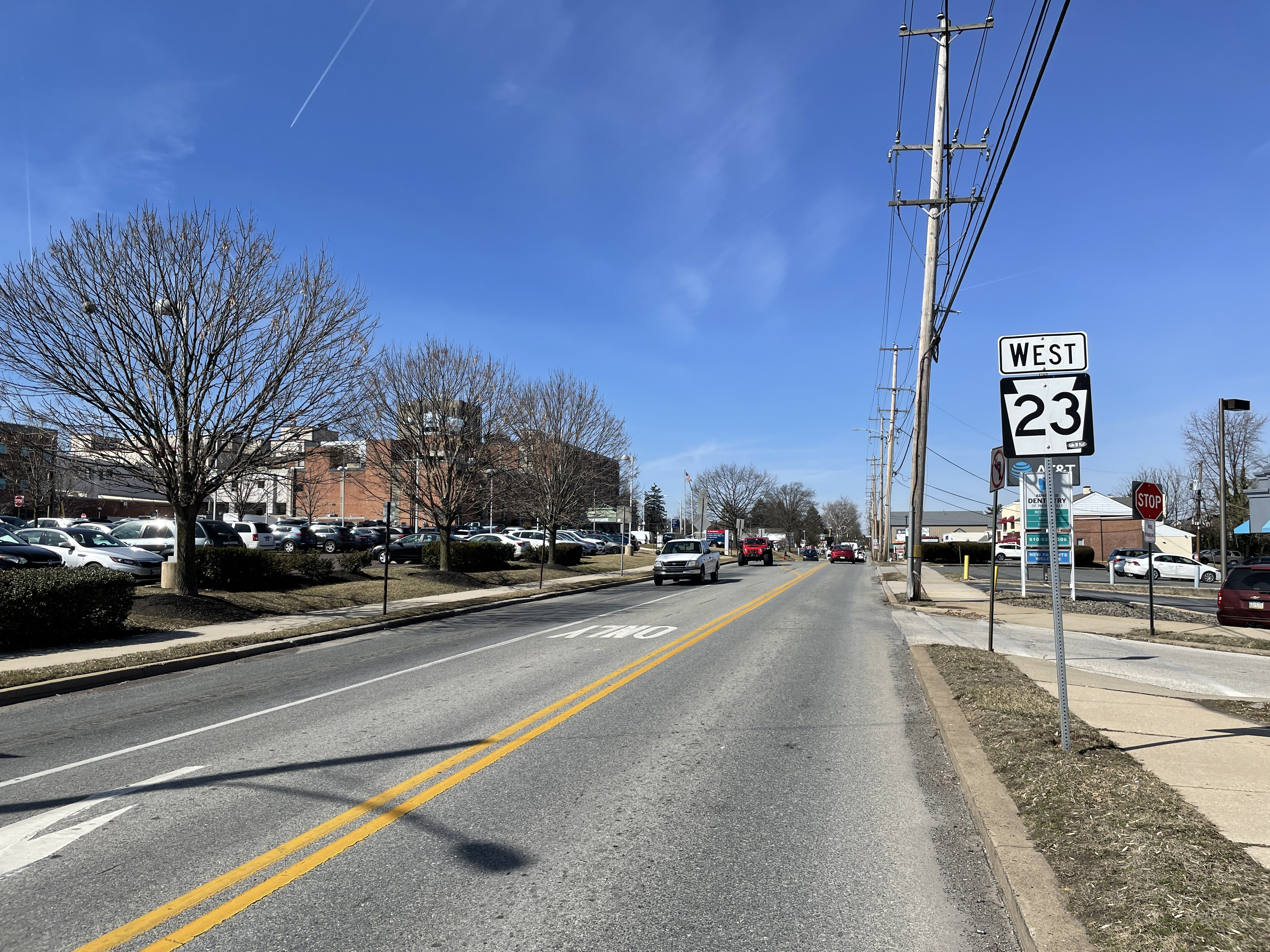
PA 23 westbound past PA 29 in Phoenixville

A short distance past the PA 401 intersection, PA 23 enters the borough of Elverson in Chester County as West Main Street, briefly gaining a median before passing homes and intersecting the northern terminus of PA 82. Past this intersection, the name of the roadway becomes East Main Street. The route briefly gains a median again before it leaves Elverson for West Nantmeal Township, where it becomes Ridge Road and heads into a mix of farmland and woodland with some homes. The road soon enters Warwick Township, where it reaches a junction with PA 345 in the community of Warwick. PA 23 continues through wooded areas with some fields and residences, passing to the south of the community of Saint Peters, where it crosses French Creek, and running to the north of Warwick County Park. The route crosses into South Coventry Township and passes through the community of Coventryville before it intersects PA 100 in Bucktown. The road passes south of Owen J. Roberts High School before it crosses into East Vincent Township and continues through a mix of fields, woods, and homes, soon entering East Coventry Township. PA 23 curves southeast and crosses back into East Vincent Township and runs through more rural land with some residences, passing to the north of a golf course. The route enters East Pikeland Township and passes near residential neighborhoods before it intersects the eastern terminus of PA 724.

At this point, PA 23 turns south onto Schuylkill Road, passing businesses and curving to the southeast. The route becomes the border between the borough of Phoenixville to the northeast and Schuylkill Township to the southwest and crosses French Creek before passing more businesses and intersecting PA 113. At this point, PA 113 turns southeast to form a concurrency with PA 23 on Nutt Road, a three-lane road with a center left-turn lane that fully enters Phoenixville. The road passes businesses and crosses under an abandoned railroad line, at which point it continues through residential areas. PA 113 splits from PA 23 by heading northeast on Bridge Street, while PA 23 continues southeast on two-lane Nutt Road. The route runs through residential areas with some businesses and passes to the northeast of Phoenixville Hospital before crossing PA 29. The road passes more suburban development and crosses into Schuylkill Township, where it becomes Valley Forge Road and curves to the east. PA 23 crosses Pickering Creek at the dam forming Pickering Creek Reservoir to the south and turns southeast through wooded areas of residential development. The route reaches the community of Valley Forge, where it curves east and enters Valley Forge National Historical Park, the site where General George Washington and the Continental Army made an important winter encampment during the American Revolutionary War.

=== Montgomery County ===
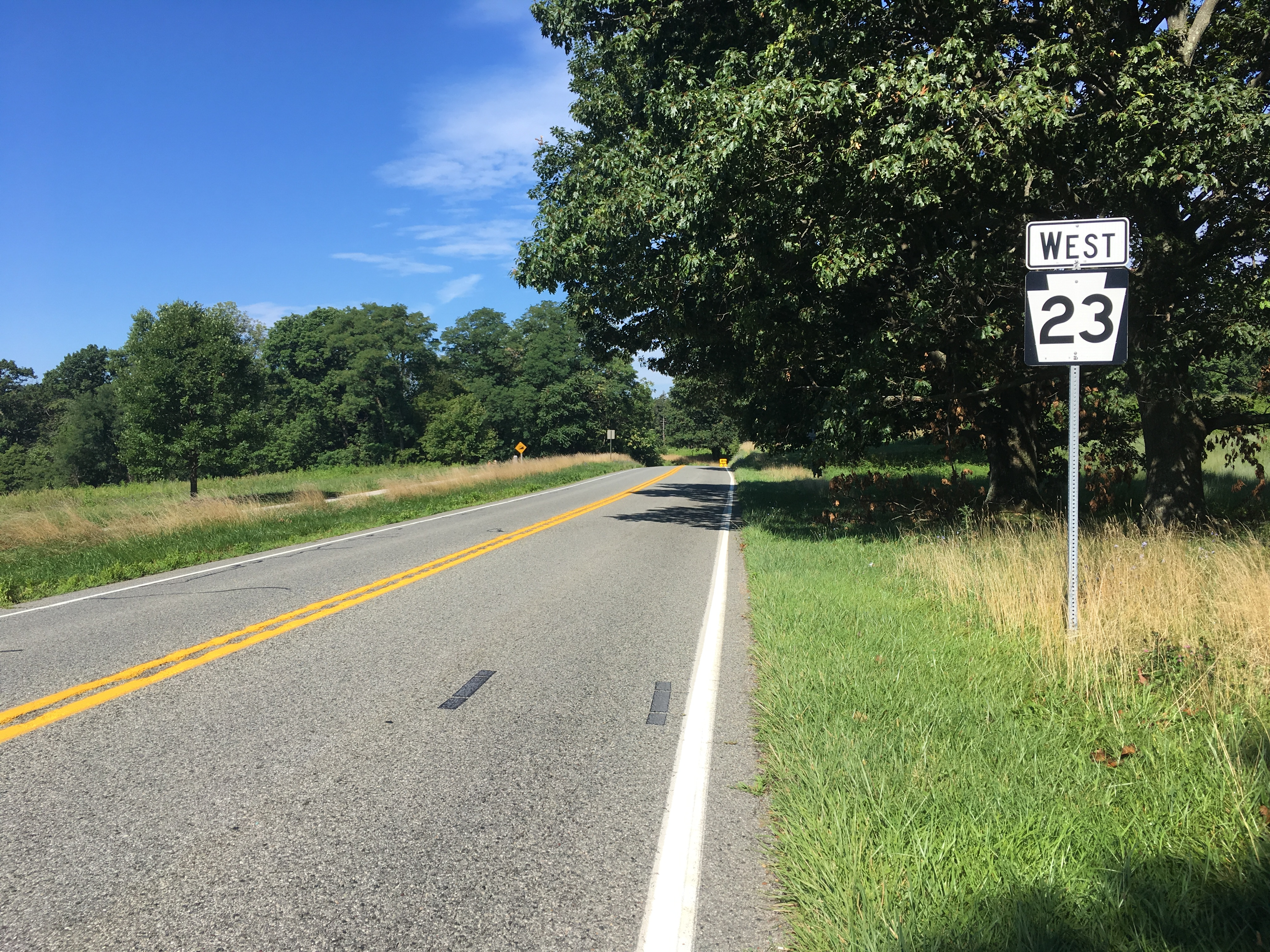
PA 23 westbound through Valley Forge National Historical Park

Upon crossing Valley Creek, PA 23 enters Upper Merion Township in Montgomery County and intersects the northern terminus of PA 252 to the south of Washington's Headquarters. The route becomes Valley Forge Park Road and has a junction with Gulph Road. The road continues east through fields and woods within Valley Forge National Historical Park, passing north of the Friedrich Wilhelm von Steuben statue and south of Washington Memorial Chapel. PA 23 curves south and intersects North Gulph Road east of the park's Visitor Center, at which point the route turns east onto four-lane divided Valley Forge Road and immediately comes to an interchange with the US 422 freeway. The route passes between residential high-rise buildings to the north and business parks to the south, narrowing into a two-lane undivided road and heading northeast. The road turns southeast and crosses Trout Creek, running near more business parks and widening back to a four-lane divided highway. PA 23 turns northeast onto four-lane, undivided, township-maintained Geerdes Boulevard briefly, with Allendale Road continuing southeast, before heading east on two-lane, undivided, state-maintained Valley Forge Road. The route winds east through suburban residential neighborhoods in King of Prussia, intersecting Henderson Road. The road passes near more homes before reaching a bridge over the unused Schuylkill Parkway freeway stub. PA 23 passes under the William F. Dannehower Memorial Bridge, which carries southbound US 202 over the route and the Schuylkill River to the north, and curves south into the borough of Bridgeport. Here, the route comes to an intersection with the Schuylkill Parkway, which provides a connection to the route from southbound US 202, and turns east onto four-lane divided Schuylkill Parkway, passing to the south of industrial development and crossing under SEPTA's Norristown High Speed Line. PA 23 intersects northbound US 202 and the Chester Valley Trail at Dekalb Street in the commercial center of Bridgeport and continues east past urban homes and businesses on two-lane undivided West 4th Street. The route becomes East 4th Street, crossing an abandoned railroad line, and passes near more neighborhoods and some industrial development, curving southeast.

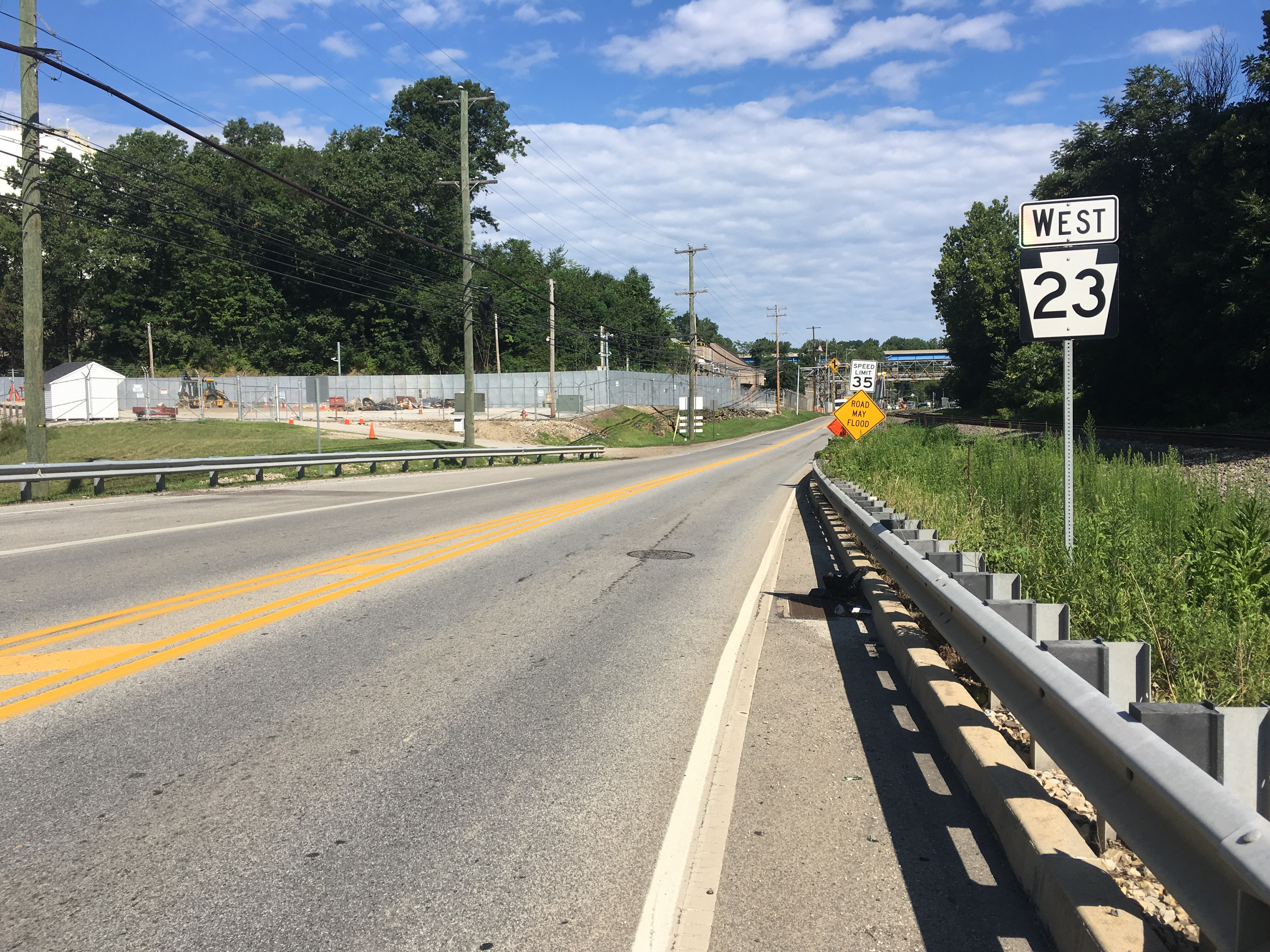
PA 23 westbound in West Conshohocken

PA 23 turns east onto Coates Street and forms the border between Bridgeport to the north and Upper Merion Township to the south. The route curves southeast into Upper Merion Township and becomes Schuylkill River Road, running between homes to the southwest and Norfolk Southern's Harrisburg Line and the Schuylkill River parallel to the northeast. The road passes under the Schuylkill River Bridge, which carries the Pennsylvania Turnpike (I-276), and Norfolk Southern's Dale Secondary, continuing south through a mix of woodland and industrial areas further west of the river and the railroad tracks and passing to the east of a quarry. In Swedeland, PA 23 gains a second westbound lane and intersects the northern terminus of PA 320. The road curves southeast past more industry, narrowing to two lanes and crossing an Upper Merion and Plymouth Railroad spur at-grade before entering the borough of West Conshohocken. Here, the route becomes Front Street and runs closely parallel to the Harrisburg Line and the Schuylkill River again, passing under the Pearl Harbor Memorial Bridge that carries I-476 over the river. PA 23 heads through PECO's West Conshohocken Gas Operations Center before it crosses Gulph Creek. Following this, the route runs past homes and intersects Fayette Street/Matsonford Road near several high-rise office buildings. Fayette Street heads northeast across the river on the Fayette Street Bridge to the borough of Conshohocken and Matsonford Road heads southwest to provide access to I-76 and I-476.

Past this, the route becomes Crawford Avenue and curves to the east past commercial development. The road turns south and becomes Conshohocken State Road, passing under I-76. PA 23 enters Lower Merion Township and curves southeast, passing through forested areas of residential development. At the Spring Mill Road intersection, the route becomes township-maintained and winds its way southeast. The road heads through the community of Gladwyne, where it passes homes and a few businesses, before it crosses Mill Creek and makes a turn to the north and a curve southeast in forested areas. At Hollow Road, PA 23 becomes state-maintained again and winds southeast through more wooded residential areas. The route comes to Bala Cynwyd, where it intersects Montgomery Avenue and Bala Avenue and turns east to follow four-lane, township-maintained Conshohocken State Road. PA 23 passes over SEPTA's Cynwyd Line at its terminus at the Cynwyd station and turns southeast past more homes. The route enters commercial areas and reaches its eastern terminus at US 1 (City Avenue) on the border of Lower Merion Township in Montgomery County and the city of Philadelphia in Philadelphia County, at which point Conshohocken Avenue continues into Philadelphia.

== History ==
=== Designation ===
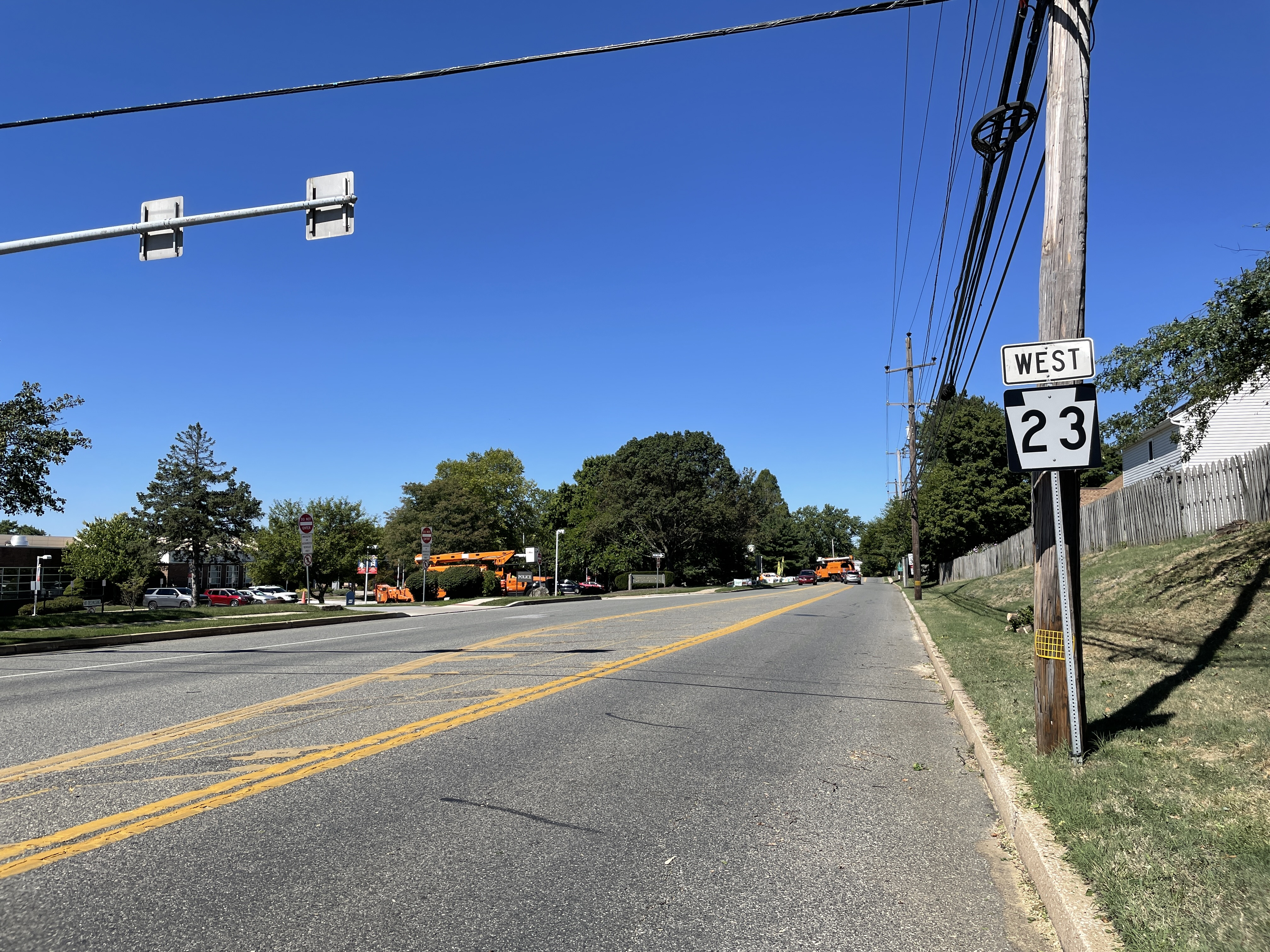
PA 23 westbound in King of Prussia

The road between Marietta and Lancaster was chartered as a private turnpike called the Lancaster, New Haven, and Waterford Turnpike in 1805, later being known as the Lancaster and Marietta Turnpike. What would become PA 23 between Lancaster and New Holland was chartered as the New Holland and Lancaster Turnpike on March 20, 1810. The Morgantown, Churchtown, and Blue Ball Turnpike was chartered on February 25, 1814. This turnpike, which was built along the Horse-Shoe Road and ran between the Downingtown and Harrisburg Turnpike at Blue Ball and Little Conestoga in Morgantown, was finished in 1819.

When Pennsylvania first legislated routes in 1911, what would become PA 23 was designated as Legislative Route 244 between Leacock and Morgantown and Legislative Route 201 between Phoenixville and King of Prussia. In 1927, PA 23 was designated to run from US 230/PA 41/PA 72 (Prince Street) in Lancaster east to City Avenue on the border of Philadelphia. The route followed Walnut Street and New Holland Avenue before continuing along its current alignment between Lancaster and Port Kennedy, where it ran southeast along Gulph Road and Old Gulph Road before turning east along Spring Mill Road and southeast along Morris Avenue, Williamson Road, Old Gulph Road, Mill Creek Road, Conshohocken State Road, and Bala Avenue. When first designated, the entire length of the route was paved. The route between Marietta and Lancaster was an unnumbered road that was paved by 1930. The present route between Bridgeport and Swedeland was designated as part of PA 123 in 1928.

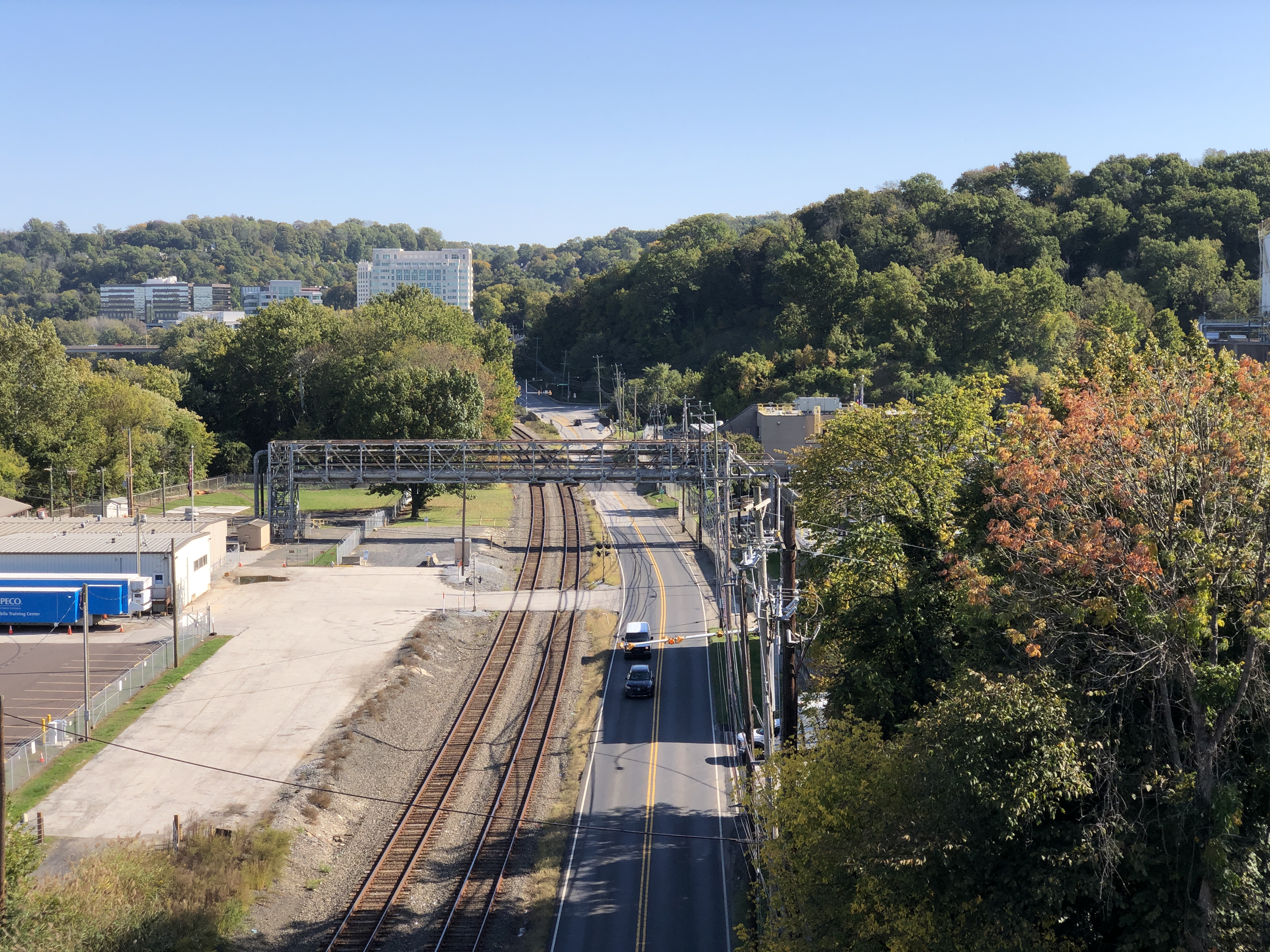
PA 23 eastbound entering West Conshohocken

In the 1930s, PA 23 was extended east to US 30 (Girard Avenue) in West Philadelphia, following Conshohocken Avenue and Belmont Avenue. By 1940, the road between Marietta and Lancaster became part of an extended PA 340. By 1945, PA 23 was rerouted to pass through Valley Forge Park along Gulph Road, with an extended PA 363 replacing the route on Valley Forge Road and PA 652 replacing the designation between PA 363 and Gulph Road. By 1950, PA 23 Truck was designated as a truck bypass of the section along Gulph Road through Valley Forge Park, running concurrent with PA 363 on Valley Forge Road before turning south along former PA 652. In addition, PA 23 Alt. was designated as an alternate alignment in Lower Merion Township following Montgomery Avenue. The current alignment between US 202 in Bridgeport and Spring Mill Road in Lower Merion Township became a northern extension of PA 320 by 1960.

By 1967, PA 23 was moved to its current alignment between Valley Forge and Bala Cynwyd. The route replaced PA 363 and PA 23 Truck along Valley Forge Road through Valley Forge Park and replaced PA 320 between Bridgeport and Spring Mill Road. By 1970, PA 23 was extended west from US 222/PA 72 in Lancaster to PA 441 in Marietta, replacing PA 340. In Lancaster, the route was moved to a one-way pair following Chestnut Street eastbound and Walnut Street westbound between College Avenue and Plum Street. In the 1970s, the west end of the one-way pair in Lancaster was shifted to Race Street while westbound PA 462 was designated concurrent with westbound PA 23 on Walnut Street, shifting from Orange Street. The eastern terminus of PA 23 was cut back from US 30 (Girard Avenue) to US 1 (City Avenue) in Philadelphia in the 1980s. In 1992, the four lane-road connecting the east end of Chestnut and Walnut streets to the US 30 freeway in Lancaster was built, and PA 23 was rerouted off New Holland Avenue to follow Chestnut and Walnut streets east before continuing northeast on the four-lane road and northwest on the US 30 freeway over the Conestoga River to rejoin New Holland Pike.

=== Freeway proposals ===
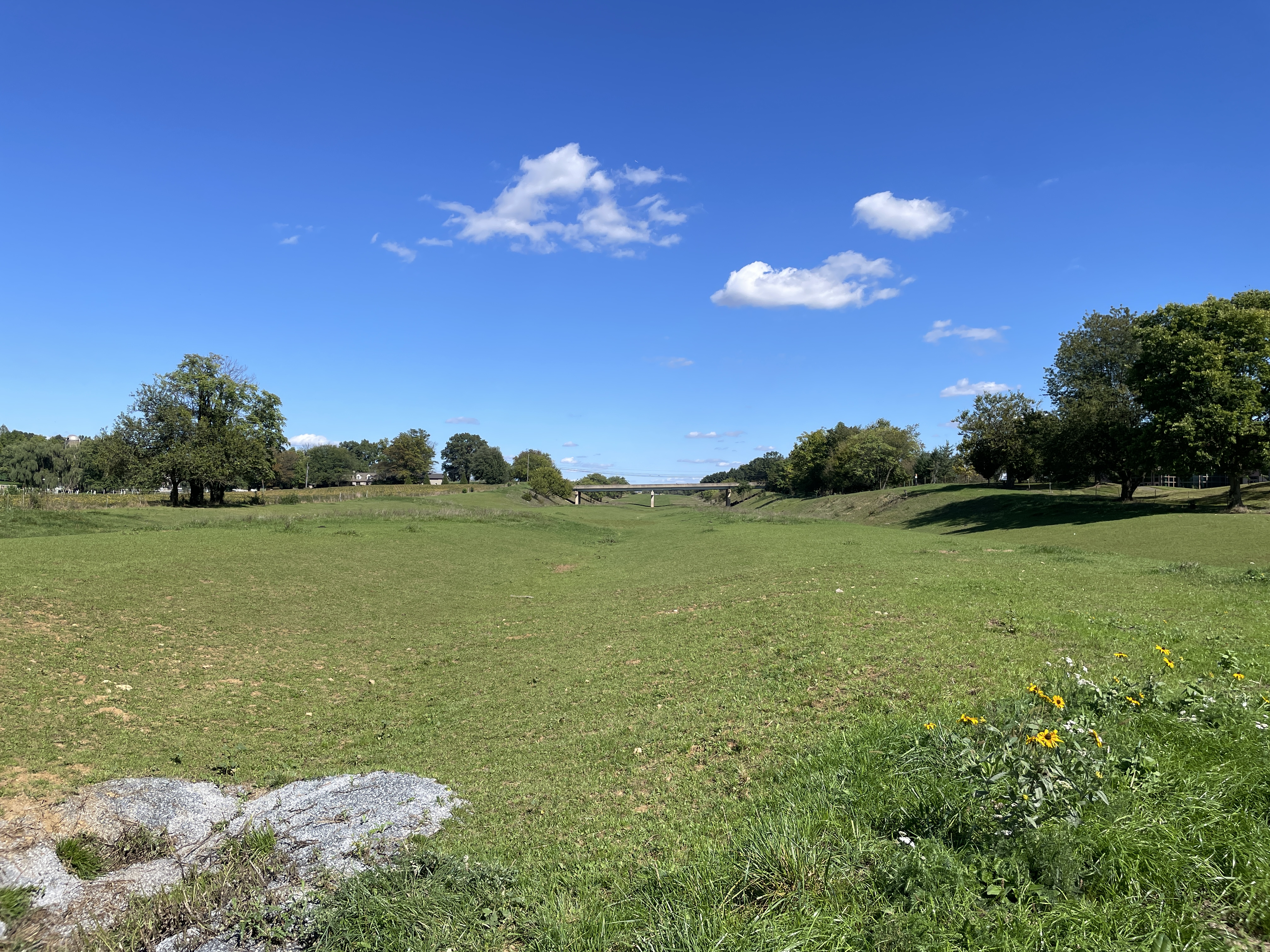
Uncompleted PA 23 freeway right-of-way, known as the "Goat Path", in East Lampeter Township

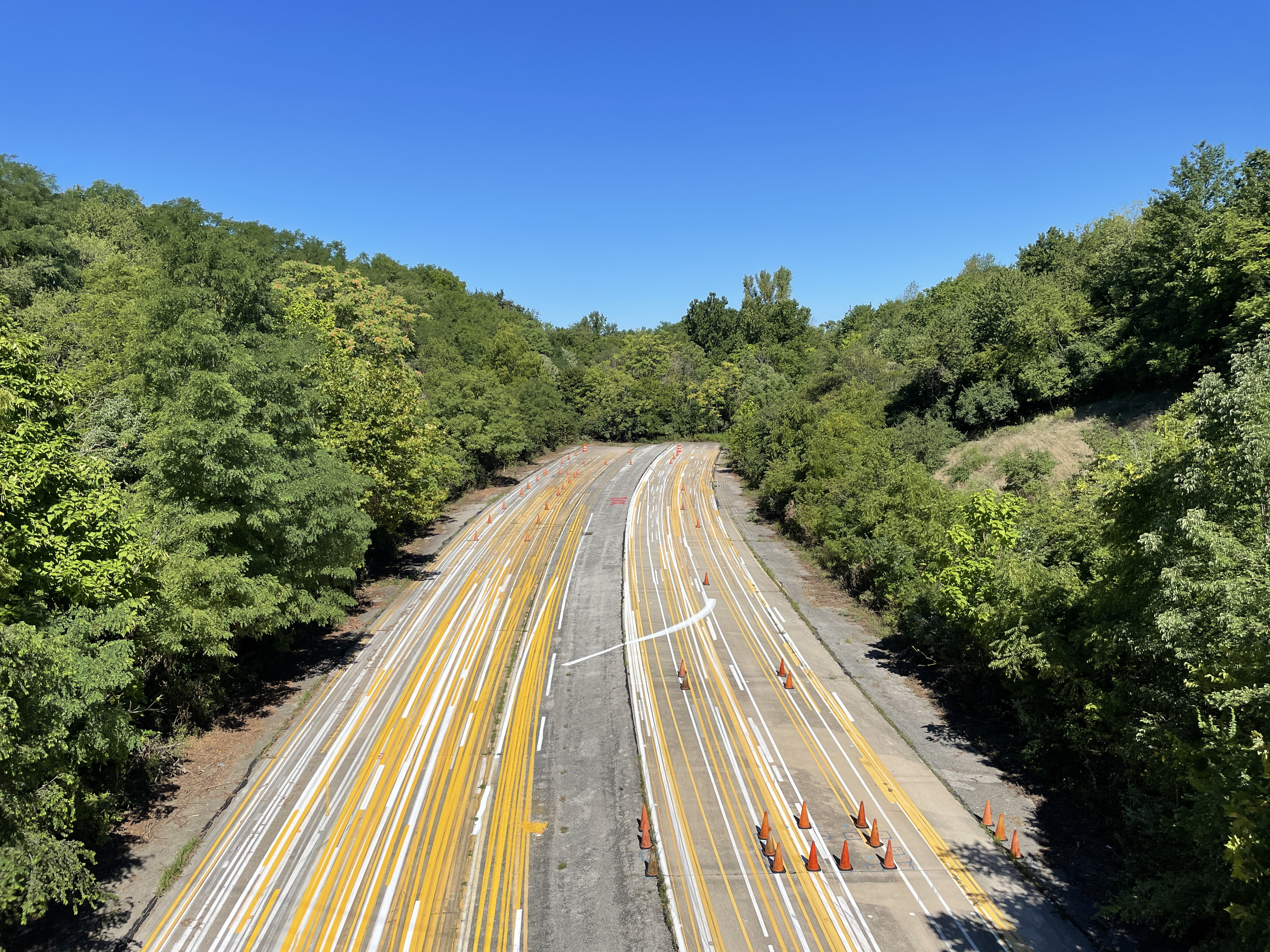
The Schuylkill Parkway freeway stub near Bridgeport

In the 1960s, plans were made to build a freeway for PA 23 between US 30 and PA 772 in Lancaster County. Construction began, but was stopped due to funding issues and public opposition. In 1977, the right-of-way for the freeway was planted over and leased to area farmers, becoming known as the "Goat Path". Traces of the incomplete freeway remain, including bridges over and under local roads, grading for the roadway, and an incomplete interchange with PA 772. Despite the cancellation of the freeway, plans continued for capacity improvements on the PA 23 corridor in eastern Lancaster County due to increased traffic levels. Two proposed alternatives existed to build a new two-lane alignment of PA 23 east of Lancaster. The Bareville Connector Alternative would build a new two-lane PA 23 between the US 30 interchange east of the Conestoga River and Bareville, following the Goat Path and having access to Greenfield Road, Horseshoe Road, and PA 772. In addition, a two-lane Industrial Connector would be built between PA 23 in Bareville and Diller Avenue in New Holland. The Southern Alternative would build a new two-lane PA 23 between the US 30 interchange east of the Conestoga River and US 322 in Blue Ball. The route would utilize the Goat Path and have access to Greenfield Road, Horseshoe Road, PA 772, Diller Avenue, New Holland Road, Ranck Road, and Rancks Church Road. The proposed two-lane bypass would have cost $100 million. In 2010, the project was shelved after the Pennsylvania Department of Transportation (PennDOT) determined it needed the money to repair structurally deficient bridges. In July 2022, PennDOT broke ground on a project that extended Walnut Street northeast 1.2 mi (1.9 km) from the interchange between US 30 and PA 23 along the Goat Path alignment. The extension of Walnut Street was built as a two-lane road along with a parallel bicycle and pedestrian trail called the Greater Lancaster Heritage Pathway. The road, which cost $22 million, was built to alleviate traffic congestion. The Walnut Street extension running between US 30 and PA 23 and Ben Franklin Boulevard opened to traffic on September 29, 2023.

Plans were made in the late 1960s to build the Schuylkill Parkway, a freeway bypass of PA 23 between US 422 and US 202 in Upper Merion Township. In 1972, overhead traffic signals were installed and a portion of the road was built west from US 202 and PA 23 in Bridgeport. Construction was halted after PennDOT ran out of funds to construct the road. The short freeway stub of the Schuylkill Parkway that was built became known as "The Road to Nowhere". In 2002, the Schuylkill Parkway was incorporated into new plans to build a bypass of PA 23 in Upper Merion Township, this time as a surface road that would connect and improve existing roads. Nothing has come from these plans so far. The Schuylkill Parkway freeway stub has been used as a filming location as well as for training emergency vehicle drivers and for commercial vehicle driver tests. It is maintained by PennDOT as State Route 3021, an unsigned quadrant route.

Also in the 1960s, plans were made to build the Phoenixville Spur, a 4.4-mile expressway spur route of PA 23 running from the intersection of PA 23 and PA 724 in East Pikeland Township to the then-planned Pottstown Expressway (US 422) near Arcola. The spur was planned to include interchanges at Township Line Road and Freemont Street (PA 113) in the borough of Phoenixville, an interchange with PA 29 near Mont Clare, and a partial interchange with the Pottstown Expressway at the route's eastern terminus, providing access to and from the east. Although PennDOT had secured funding for the spur, the start of construction was delayed for many years due to both local opposition to the location of the highway within Phoenixville, along with disputes over the design of the interchanges within the borough. As a result, the project has been considered dead since the late 1970s. One remnant of the Phoenixville Spur can still be seen today, as part of the Pottstown Expressway (US 422) near Arcola was constructed with a wide median, done specifically to accommodate for the planned interchange with the spur.

In 2006, the Delaware Valley Regional Planning Commission proposed the "Intercounty Relief Route", a smaller-scale project that focused on the improvement of the corridor that would have been occupied by the Phoenixville Spur. The project focused on the improvement of local roads instead of the construction of an expressway, while still providing a new crossing of the Schuylkill River, which was originally included with the spur route. No significant progress has been made on the Intercounty Relief Route however, largely due to both recent residential development in the area and concerns with the proximity of the potential Schuylkill River crossing to the historic Oakes Reach section of the Schuylkill Canal.

== Major intersections ==
County	Location	mi	km	Destinations	Notes
Lancaster	Marietta–East Donegal Township line	0.000	0.000	PA 441 (River Road)	Western terminus
Lancaster	East Hempfield Township	9.541	15.355	PA 741 (Rohrerstown Road)	
Lancaster	Lancaster	11.565	18.612	PA 462 west (Race Avenue)	West end of PA 462 westbound concurrency
Lancaster	Lancaster	12.451	20.038	US 222 south / PA 272 south (Prince Street)	Southbound only
Lancaster	Lancaster	12.651	20.360	PA 72 north (Queen Street)	Northbound only
Lancaster	Lancaster	12.851	20.682	US 222 north / PA 272 north (Lime Street)	Northbound only
Lancaster	Lancaster	13.551	21.808	PA 462 east (Broad Street)	East end of PA 462 westbound concurrency
Lancaster	Lancaster			Western end of limited-access section	
Lancaster	Lancaster	15.114	24.324	US 30 east – Coatesville	West end of US 30 concurrency
Lancaster	Manheim Township	15.673	25.223	US 30 west – York, Harrisburg	East end of US 30 concurrency
Lancaster	Manheim Township	15.673	25.223	Eastern end of limited-access section	
Lancaster	Upper Leacock Township	20.793	33.463	PA 772 west (Glenbrook Road)	West end of PA 772 concurrency
Lancaster	Upper Leacock Township	21.036	33.854	PA 772 east (Newport Road)	East end of PA 772 concurrency
Lancaster	East Earl Township	29.100	46.832	US 322 – Ephrata, Honey Brook	
Lancaster	East Earl Township	29.637	47.696	PA 897 north (Weaverland Valley Road)	West end of PA 897 concurrency
Lancaster	East Earl Township	30.159	48.536	PA 897 south (Springville Road)	East end of PA 897 concurrency
Lancaster	East Earl Township	30.486	49.062	PA 625 north (Reading Road) – Bowmansville, Reading	Southern terminus of PA 625
Lancaster	Caernarvon Township	37.316	60.054	PA 10 south (Twin County Road) – Honey Brook	West end of PA 10 concurrency
Berks	Caernarvon Township	37.515	60.375	I-176 north – Green Hills, Reading	Access to I-176 north and from I-176 south; access via SR 2089; exit 2 on I-176; former I-176 routing
Berks	Caernarvon Township	37.962	61.094	PA 10 north (Morgantown Road) to Penna Turnpike – Beckersville	East end of PA 10 concurrency
Berks	Caernarvon Township	40.191	64.681	PA 401 east (Conestoga Road) – Malvern	Western terminus of PA 401
Chester	Elverson	41.017	66.010	PA 82 south (Chestnut Street) – Coatesville	Northern terminus of PA 82
Chester	Warwick Township	43.314	69.707	PA 345 (Bulltown Road) – Birdsboro, Coatesville	
Chester	South Coventry Township	50.288	80.931	PA 100 (Pottstown Pike) – Pottstown, West Chester	
Chester	East Pikeland Township	57.081	91.863	PA 724 west (Schuylkill Road) – Spring City, Pottstown	Eastern terminus of PA 724
Chester	Phoenixville	58.168	93.612	PA 113 south (Kimberton Road) – Downingtown	West end of PA 113 concurrency
Chester	Phoenixville	58.636	94.365	PA 113 north (Bridge Street)	East end of PA 113 concurrency
Chester	Phoenixville	59.501	95.758	PA 29 (Manavon Street / Main Street) – Collegeville, Devault	
Montgomery	Upper Merion Township	63.034	101.443	PA 252 south (Valley Creek Road) – Devon	Northern terminus of PA 252
Montgomery	Upper Merion Township	65.573	105.530	US 422 to US 202 / I-76 – Pottstown, West Chester	Interchange
Montgomery	Bridgeport	69.764	112.274	US 202 south	Interchange; access from US 202 south only
Montgomery	Bridgeport	69.942	112.561	US 202 north (Dekalb Street)	
Montgomery	Upper Merion Township	72.357	116.447	PA 320 south (Swedeland Road) – Gulph Mills	Northern terminus of PA 320
Montgomery	West Conshohocken	73.716	118.634	Matsonford Road to I-76 / I-476 – Philadelphia, Valley Forge, Chester, Plymouth Meeting	Exits 331B-332 on I-76; exits 16A-B on I-476
Montgomery–Philadelphia county line	Lower Merion Township–Philadelphia line	81.144	130.589	US 1 (City Avenue)	Eastern terminus
1.000 mi = 1.609 km; 1.000 km = 0.621 mi: Concurrency terminus; Incomplete access

== Special routes ==
=== King of Prussia alternate truck route ===
PA Route 23 Alternate Truck
- Location: Upper Merion Township
- Length: 5.1 mi (8.2 km)
- Existed: 2013–present

Pennsylvania Route 23 Alternate Truck (PA 23 Alt. Truck) is a truck route around a weight-restricted bridge over the Trout Creek in Upper Merion Township, on which trucks over 15 tons and combination loads over 25 tons are prohibited.

The route follows Gulph Road, US 202, and Henderson Road. It was signed in 2013.

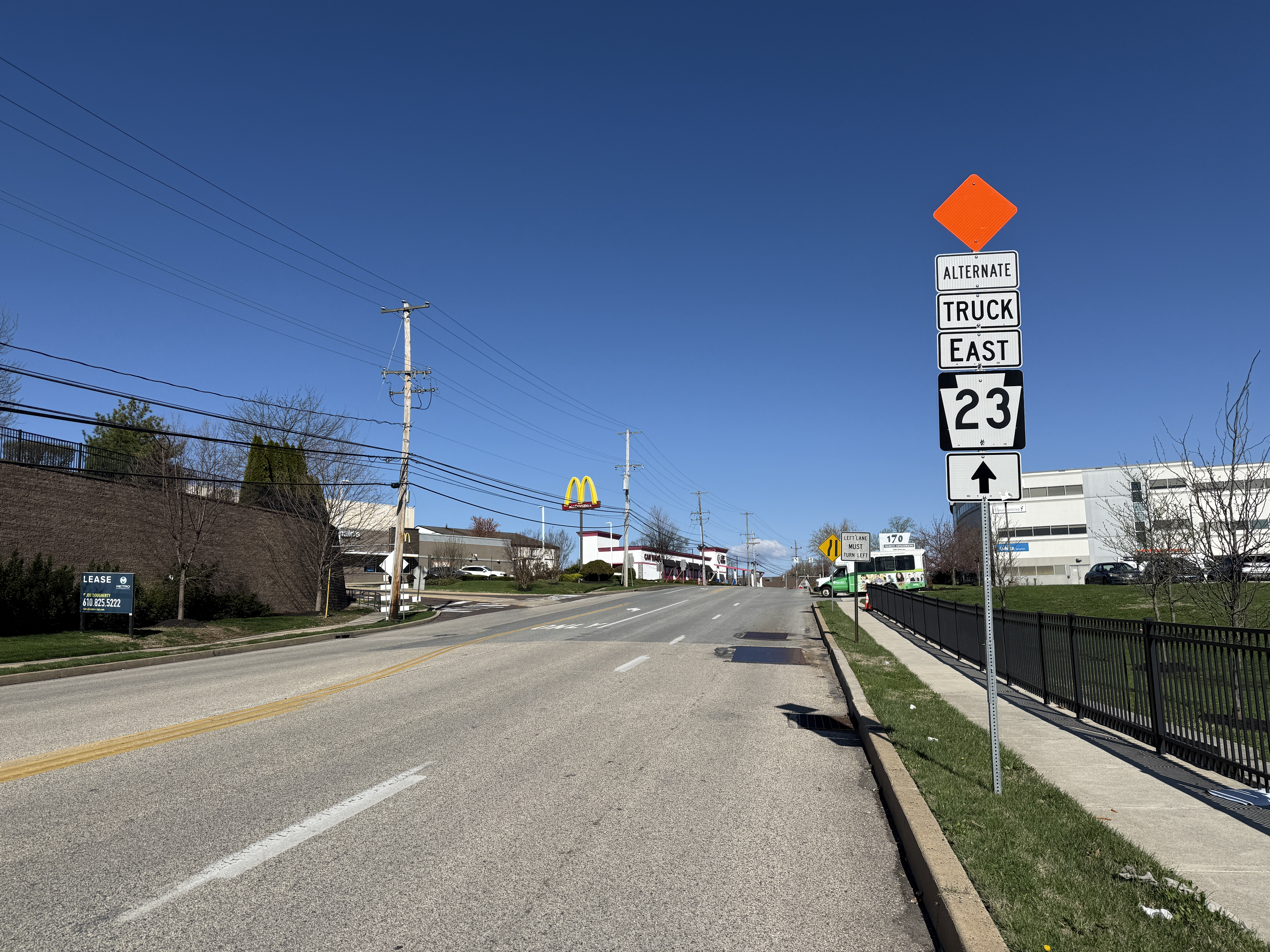
PA 23 Alt. Truck eastbound past US 202 in King of Prussia

=== Former Phoenixville alternate truck route ===
PA Route 23 Alternate Truck
- Location: East Pikeland Township–Upper Merion Township
- Length: 16.0 mi (25.7 km)
- Existed: 2013–2017

Pennsylvania Route 23 Alternate Truck (PA 23 Alt. Truck) was a truck route around a formerly weight-restricted bridge over the French Creek in Phoenixville, on which trucks over 22 tons and combination loads over 26 tons were prohibited.

The route followed PA 724, Bridge Street, Main Street, Township Line Road, and US 422.

It was signed in 2013 and decommissioned by Fall 2017 with the rehabilitation of the bridge over French Creek allowing for the removal of the weight restriction.

=== Former Lower Merion alternate route ===
Pennsylvania Route 23 Alternate
- Location: Upper Merion Township–Lower Merion Township
- Existed: 1937–1967

Pennsylvania Route 23 Alternate (PA 23 Alt.) was an alternate route of PA 23 in Montgomery County.

The route began at PA 23 (Gulph Road) in Upper Merion Township and headed southeast on Montgomery Avenue into Lower Merion Township, reaching an intersection with PA 320.

PA 23 Alt. continued southeast and passed through Narberth before it ended at another intersection with PA 23 (Conshohocken State Road) in Bala Cynwyd.

PA 23 Alt. was designated in 1937.

The alternate route was decommissioned in 1967, with PA 320 replacing the route north of Spring Mill Road.

=== Former Valley Forge truck route ===
Pennsylvania Route 23 Truck
- Location: Upper Merion Township
- Existed: 1950–1967

Pennsylvania Route 23 Truck (PA 23 Truck) was a truck route around the section of PA 23 that followed Gulph Road through Valley Forge Park.

The truck route began at PA 23 near the community of Valley Forge and headed east concurrent with PA 363 on Valley Forge Road. At Port Kennedy, PA 363 turned north and PA 23 Truck headed south to rejoin PA 23 near King of Prussia.

PA 23 Truck was designated by 1950, following PA 363 along Valley Forge Road and replacing PA 652 between Port Kennedy and King of Prussia.

The truck route was decommissioned in 1967, with PA 23 replacing the route along with PA 363 on Valley Forge Road and the route east of there becoming a rerouted PA 363 on North Gulph Road.
