= Charles Coventry =

Charles Coventry may refer to:

- Charles Coventry (British Army officer) (1867–1929), English cricketer and British Army officer
- Charles Coventry (Zimbabwean cricketer) (born 1983), Zimbabwean cricketer
- Charles Coventry (umpire) (1958–2011), Zimbabwean cricket umpire
