= Pughtown, Pennsylvania =

Unincorporated community in Pennsylvania, US

- Census-designated place
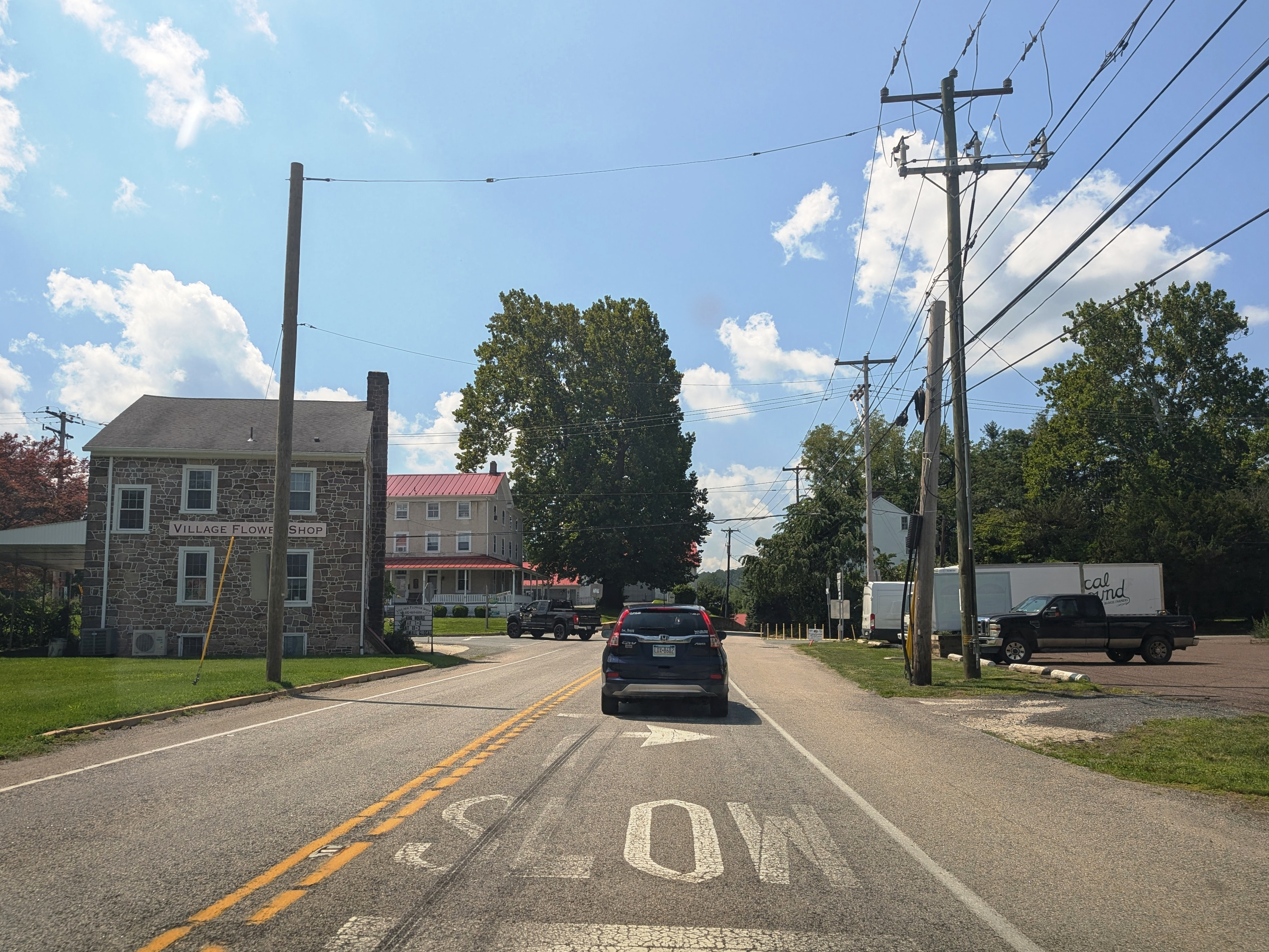
- PA 100 southbound in Pughtown

- Location in Chester County and the U.S. state of Pennsylvania

- Location within the state of Pennsylvania
- Coordinates: 40°10′00″N 75°39′56″W
- Country: United States
- State: Pennsylvania
- County: Chester
- Township: South Coventry

Area
  - Total: 0.45 sq mi (1.16 km^{2})
  - Land: 0.45 sq mi (1.16 km^{2})
  - Water: 0.0039 sq mi (0.01 km^{2})

Population (2020)
  - Total: 849
  - Density: 1,899.2/sq mi (733.27/km^{2})
- Time zone: UTC-5 (Eastern (EST))
  - Summer (DST): UTC-4 (EDT)
- FIPS code: 42-62872

Pughtown is an unincorporated community and census-designated place in Chester County, Pennsylvania, United States. The community is located in South Coventry Township on Pennsylvania Route 100, just south of Buckstown. As of 2020, the CDP has a population of 849.

== Demographics ==
Historical population
Census	Pop.	Note	%±
2020	849		—
U.S. Decennial Census

== Education ==
The community is in the Owen J. Roberts School District. Owen J. Roberts High School is the zoned comprehensive high school.

== Notable people ==
- Stephen M. Meredith (1802–1874), physician of Pughtown and member of the Pennsylvania House of Representatives
- Jules Louis Prevost (1863–1937), missionary, linguist, and professor who died in Pughtown

== See also ==
- Townsend House
