= Gertrude Mary Coventry =

Scottish artist (1886–1964)

- Born: 2 November 1886; Glasgow, Scotland
- Died: 1964 (aged 77–78); Hudson, Quebec, Canada
- Education: Glasgow School of Art
- Known for: Painting
- Spouse(s): Edward Robertson, m.1915-1964, his death.

Gertrude Mary Coventry, later Gertrude Robertson, (2 November 1886 – 1964) was a Scottish artist who painted portraits, landscapes and coastal scenes.

== Biography ==
Coventry was born in Glasgow where her father, Robert McGowan Coventry was a well known artist. She studied at the Glasgow School of Art between 1902 and 1911. She regularly went on painting trips with her father to both Europe, notably to the Netherlands and Belgium, and also within Scotland. On one such trip, to Pittenweem in Fife, Coventry met her future husband, the scholar Edward Robertson, whom she married in 1915. From 1916 to 1921 the couple lived at Inveresk in East Lothian and then, between 1921 and 1934, in Bangor in north Wales where Robertson was a professor of Semitic languages. When he took a post in Manchester they moved to Didsbury before moving in 1962 to Canada where Coventry died at Hudson, Quebec in 1964.

During her career Coventry frequently exhibited with the Royal Glasgow Institute of the Fine Arts, showing some 47 pieces there and with the Glasgow Society of Lady Artists which she had joined in 1905. She also exhibited at the Royal Academy, the Royal Cambrian Academy and the Royal Scottish Academy where she showed a total of twenty works. While living in Didsbury, Coventry painted a number of portraits including one of the Chief Rabbi of Manchester. Portraits by Coventry are held by several British universities, including Bangor University, the University of St Andrews and the University of Manchester.
