= Coventry Hall =

Historic house in Pennsylvania, United States

- U.S. National Register of Historic Places
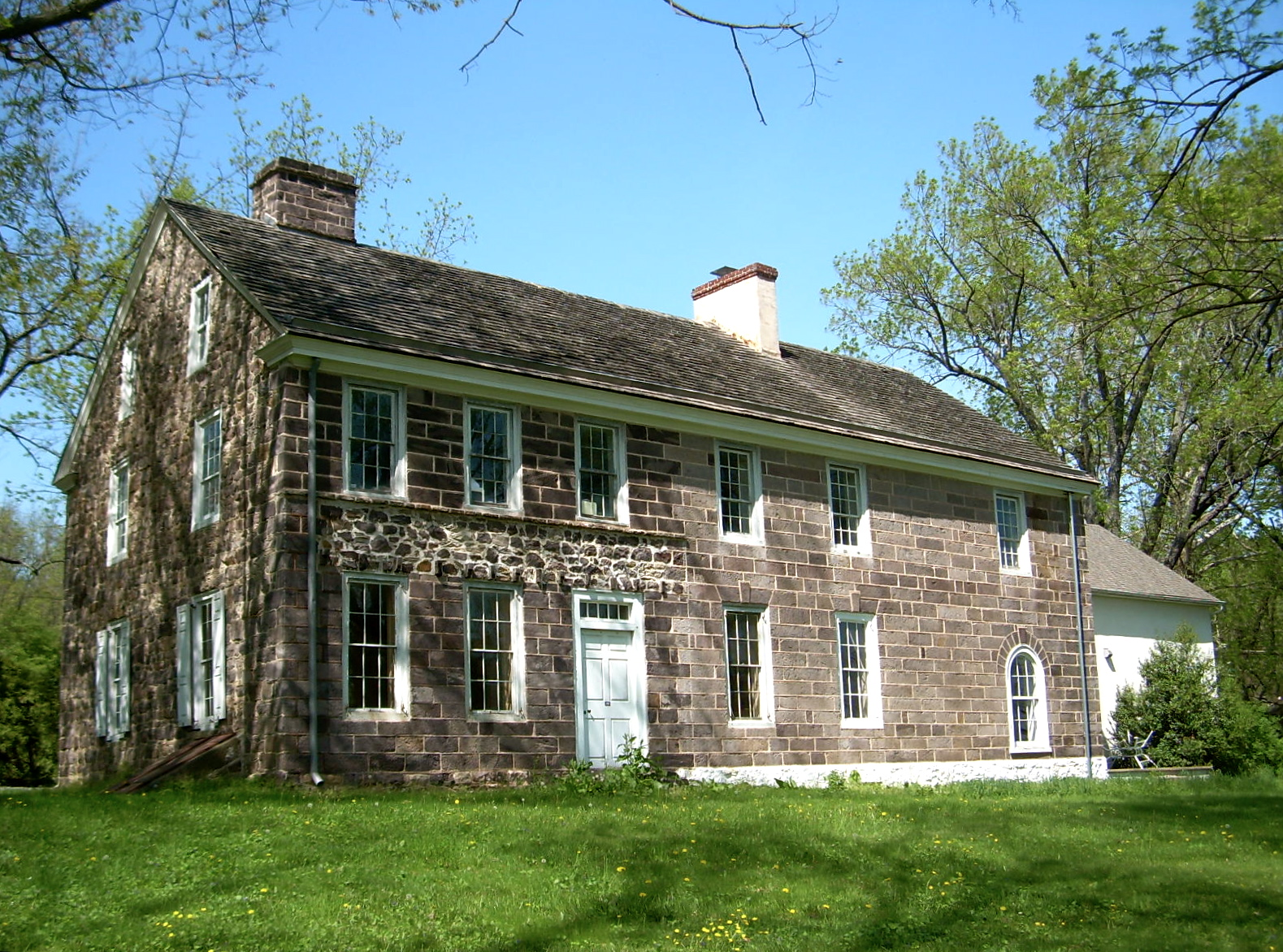
- Coventry Hall

- Location within Pennsylvania Location within the United States
- Location: Off PA 23, Township, South Coventry Township, Pennsylvania
- Coordinates: 40°10′30″N 75°41′14″W
- Area: 9.9 acres (4.0 ha)
- Built: c. 1750, c. 1798, 1803
- Architectural style: Colonial, Federal
- NRHP reference No.: 74001767
- Added to NRHP: December 16, 1974

Coventry Hall, also known as Oakleigh, is a historic home located in South Coventry Township, Chester County, Pennsylvania. It was built in three major phases. The oldest section was built between 1740 and 1760. It is a 2 1/2-story, fieldstone structure with a gable roof and cut stone on the front facade. Two additions were made on the east end; the first about 1798 and the second in 1803.

The house was added to the National Register of Historic Places in 1974.
