= Nathan Michener House =

Historic house in Pennsylvania, United States

- U.S. National Register of Historic Places
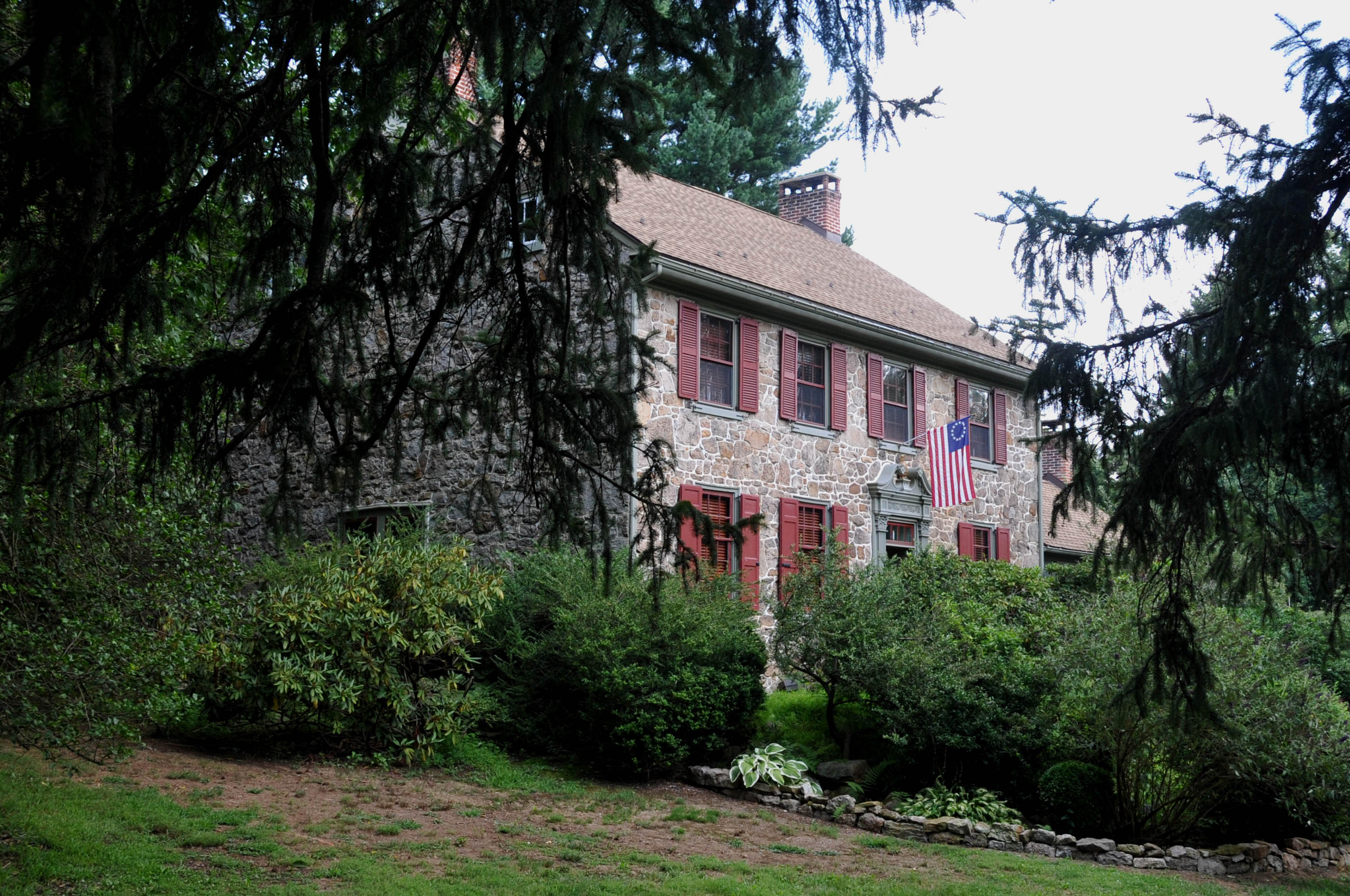

- Location within Pennsylvania Location within the United States
- Location: West of Bucktown on Ridge Road, South Coventry Township, Pennsylvania
- Coordinates: 40°10′25″N 75°40′30″W
- Area: 0.7 acres (0.28 ha)
- Built: c. 1813
- Architectural style: Greek Revival
- NRHP reference No.: 76001622
- Added to NRHP: April 3, 1976

The Nathan Michener House is an historic home that is located in South Coventry Township, Chester County, Pennsylvania, United States.

The house was added to the National Register of Historic Places in 1976.

== History and architectural features ==
Built circa 1813, this historic structure is a 2 1/2-story, four-bay by two-bay, fieldstone dwelling that was designed in a transitional Greek Revival style. It has a gable roof and end chimneys, and features large corner quoins. It also has a one-story, fieldstone sunporch with a pyramidal roof.
