= Coventryville Historic District =

Historic district in Pennsylvania, United States

- U.S. National Register of Historic Places
- U.S. Historic district
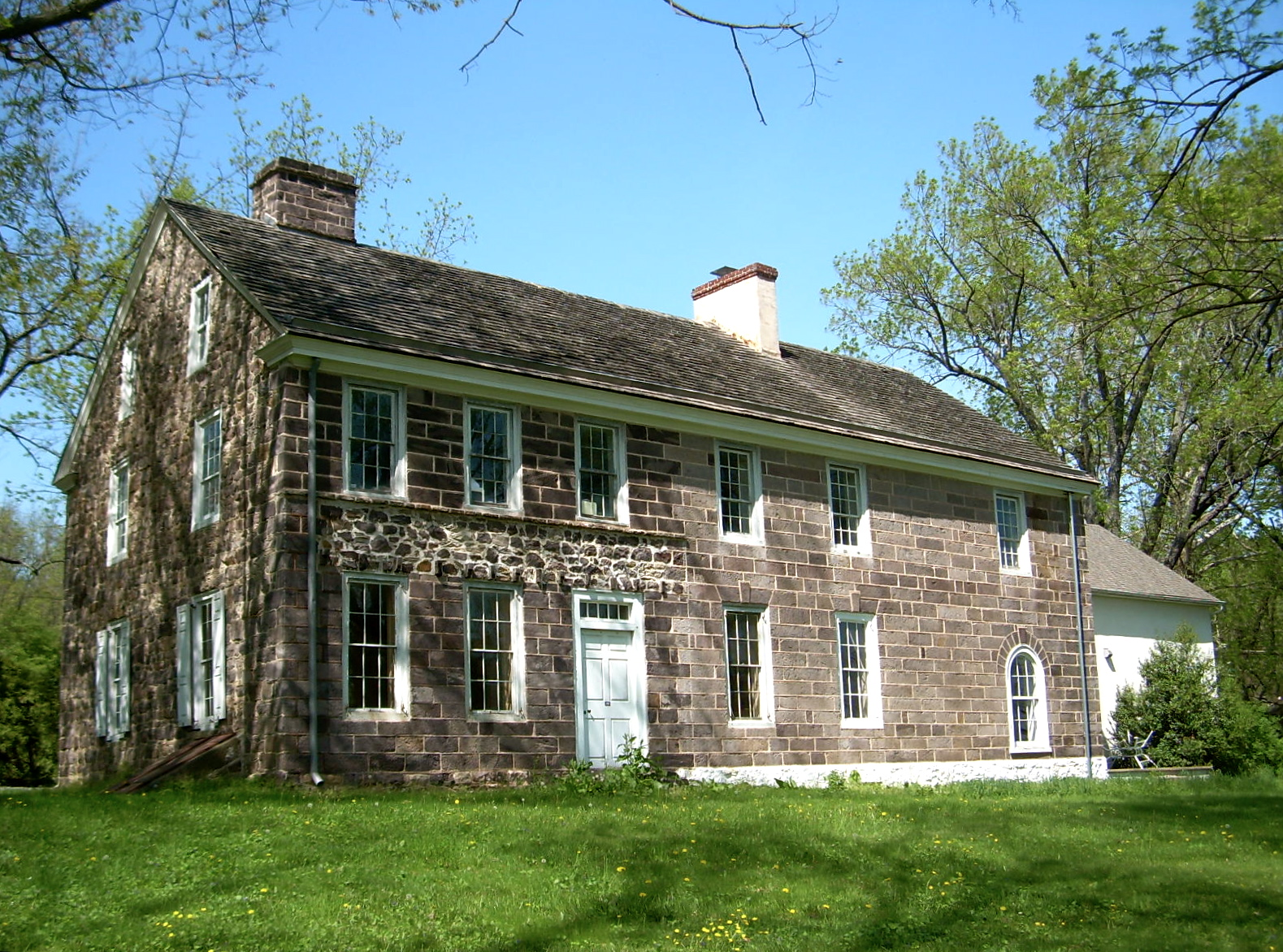
- Coventry Hall, built c. 1730.

- Location within Pennsylvania Location within the United States
- Nearest city: Pottstown, Pennsylvania
- Coordinates: 40°10′12″N 75°41′32″W
- Built: 1731
- Architectural style: Georgian, Federal
- NRHP reference No.: 78002378
- Added to NRHP: January 31, 1978

The Coventryville Historic District is a historic district and historic village in Chester County, Pennsylvania, United States that enjoyed a significant role in the early American metal industry.

== History ==
Coventryville's origins lie in the iron forge founded in 1717 by Englishman Samuel Nutt, an early American industrialist and member of Pennsylvania's Assembly in 1723–26. Named for his native home of Coventry, England, Coventry was the first forge in Chester County and was located at the confluence of the north and south branches of French Creek a short distance from rich iron deposits.

In 1723, Nutt formed a partnership with Mordecai Lincoln (great-great grandfather of Abraham Lincoln), and iron pioneer William Branson and expanded the operation to include two furnaces, Warwick and Reading. It was at Reading Furnace under Branson's operation that same year that experiments led to the production of early steel.

After Nutt's death in 1737, Coventry passed to his nephew Samuel Nutt Jr. whose wife, Rebecca Savage inherited the site upon his death. Upon her marriage to Robert Grace, Coventry and Warwick were joined to become Rebecca Nutt and Company. It was Robert Grace's close friendship with Benjamin Franklin that led to the popular legend of the Franklin Stove prototyped at Grace's home, Coventry Hall.

In 1757, Coventry and Warwick passed to Thomas Potts, Rebecca's son-in-law and father of John, founder of nearby Pottstown. By the time of the Revolution Coventry had passed his brother Samuel and Thomas Rutter. It was under the Thomas Potts/Rutter ownership that Coventry and Warwick supplied munitions for the Continental Army.

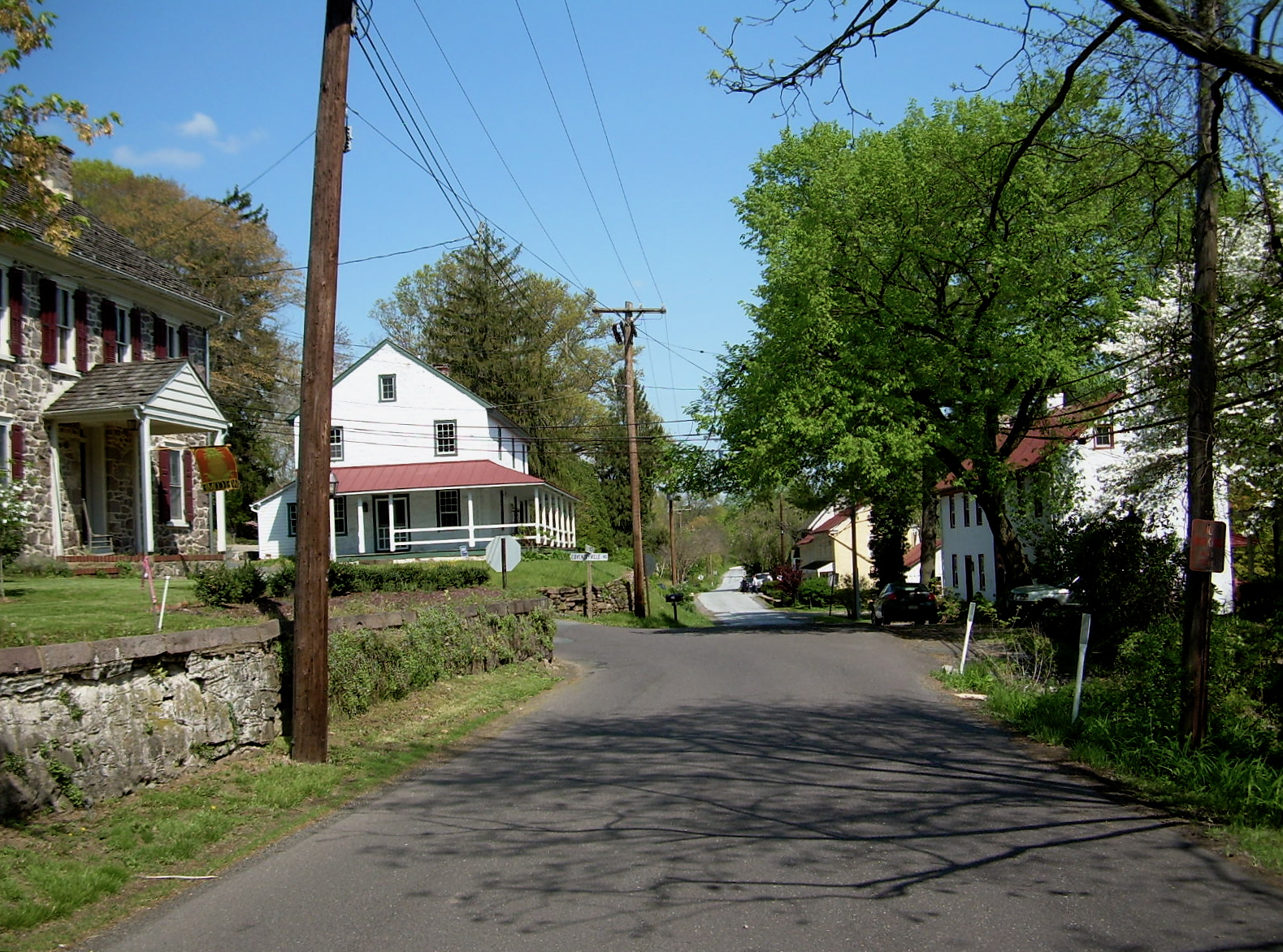
Coventryville, Pennsylvania looking east on Old Ridge Road at Coventryville Road

In the early 19th century, Coventry forge was enlarged and re-equipped and much of the present village was constructed. During this time, however, anthracite coal began to replace charcoal as fuel and new techniques for manufacturing iron and steel were developed. Smaller operations like those at Coventry and nearby Hopewell lay far from coal deposits and outside rail transportation centers and declined with only brief peaks in production during the American Civil War. Coventry Forge ceased operations entirely in 1871.

The village today consists of structures dating from the early 18th century until the mid 19th including workers housing, the Inn, the ironmaster's house (Coventry Hall) and the mid 19th century Methodist church. While the realignment of Route 23 to the south of the village in 1959–1960 obliterated a portion of the forge site, the Coventryville Historic District remains an intact concentration of original eighteenth and nineteenth century structures. The community was listed on the National Register of Historic Places in 1978.
