= Robert McGowan Coventry =

Scottish painter (1855–1914)

Robert McGowan Coventry or Robert McGown Coventry (1855–1914) was a Scottish painter born in Glasgow.

== Biography ==
Coventry studied at the Glasgow School of Art under Robert Greenlees and in Paris. Although he traveled much to the continent and the Middle East, many of his paintings depict quayside and highland scenes from eastern Scotland. He used the signature "R M G COVENTRY". His daughter, Gertrude Mary was also an artist, known for her portrait paintings.

In 1889 Coventry became a member of the Royal Scottish Society of Painters in Watercolour and in 1906 he was elected an associate of the Royal Scottish Academy, RSA. He exhibited his marine and landscape paintings mainly at the RSA.
