= Bucktown, Pennsylvania =

Unincorporated community in Pennsylvania, US

- Unincorporated village
- Location within the U.S. state of Pennsylvania Bucktown (the United States)
- Coordinates: 40°10′29″N 75°39′44″W
- Country: United States
- State: Pennsylvania
- County: Chester
- Township: South Coventry
- Time zone: UTC-5 (Eastern (EST))
  - Summer (DST): UTC-4 (EDT)

Bucktown is a historic, unincorporated village within South Coventry Township in Chester County, Pennsylvania, United States. Located at the intersection of Route 23 and Route 100, it is home to the Owen J. Roberts School District's main campus, where both the Owen J. Roberts Middle School and the Owen J. Roberts High School are located.

Much like the other surrounding villages in Northern Chester County, Bucktown contains a rich sense of historical architecture dating back to the 18th and 19th centuries. The crossroads features a bustling commercial scene that includes a gas station, two banks, a church, several restaurants, a car dealership, auto mechanic, and hair salon.

A large dairy farm named Ridglea Farms used to exist just next to Bucktown. The farm consisted of a dairy store, restaurant and farm. However, in the year 2000, the land that was farmed by Lester High for many years was sold to the development company Realan Properties, who built a large-scale development. The plans included 161 homes as well as an assisted living facility.

Bucktown took its name from Buck Tavern, which stood upon one of the corners beginning in 1790. In 1883, it had only six houses and a hotel.
