= South Coventry Township, Pennsylvania =

Township in Pennsylvania, US

South Coventry Township
- Township
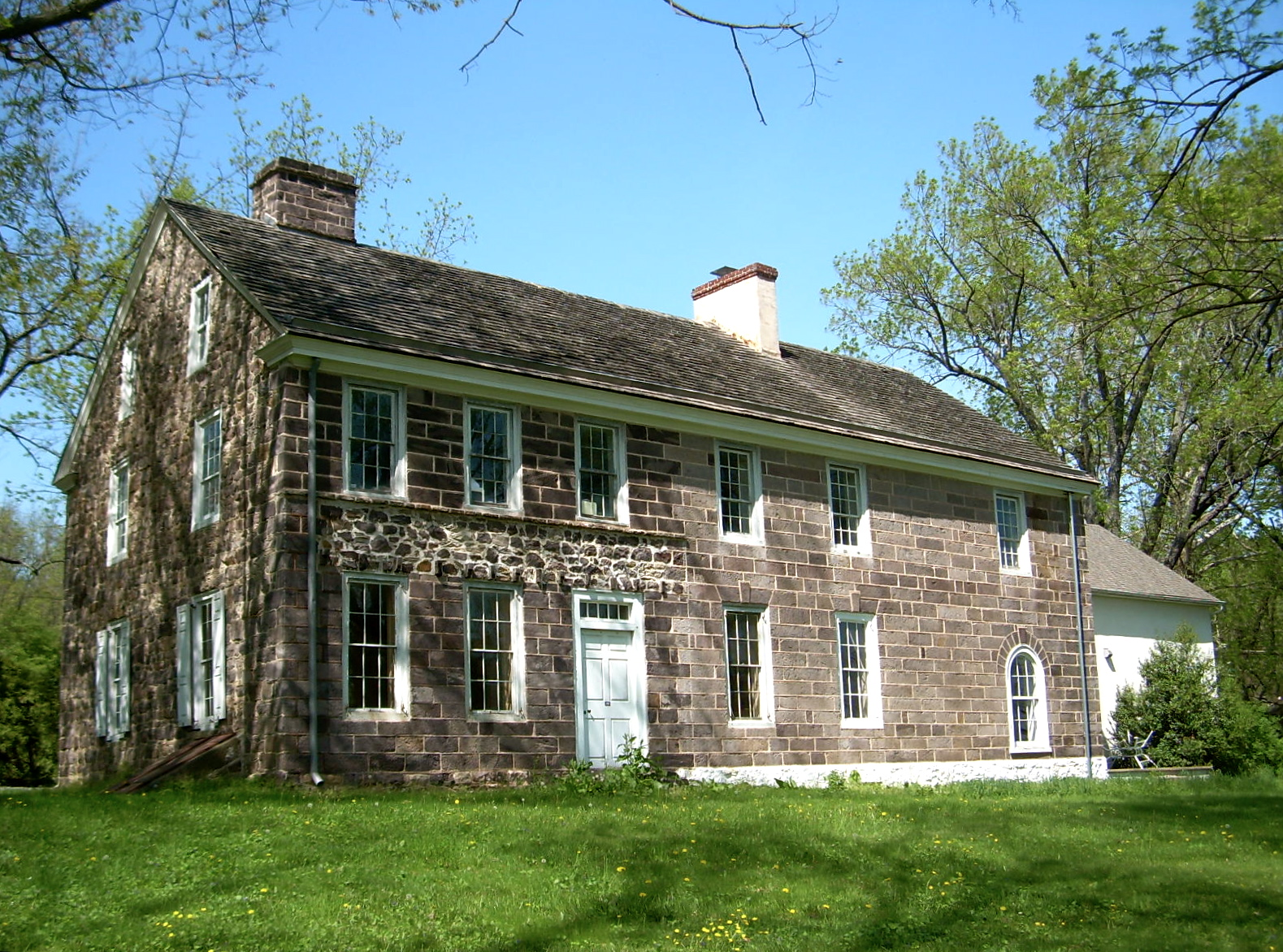
- Coventryville Historic District

- Location of South Coventry Township in Chester County and of Chester County in Pennsylvania

- Location of Pennsylvania in the United States
- Coordinates: 40°11′07″N 75°40′43″W
- Country: United States
- State: Pennsylvania
- County: Chester

Area
  - Total: 7.60 sq mi (19.68 km^{2})
  - Land: 7.54 sq mi (19.52 km^{2})
  - Water: 0.058 sq mi (0.15 km^{2})
- Elevation: 650 ft (200 m)

Population (2010)
  - Total: 2,604
  - Estimate (2016): 2,603
  - Density: 345.3/sq mi (133.34/km^{2})
- Time zone: UTC-5 (EST)
  - Summer (DST): UTC-4 (EDT)
- Area code: 610
- FIPS code: 42-029-72088
- School district: Owen J. Roberts
- Website: www.southcoventry.org

South Coventry Township is a township in Chester County, Pennsylvania, United States. The population was 2,604 at the 2010 census.

== History ==
The township derives its name from Coventry, England, the native home of an early settler.

Coventry Hall, Coventryville Historic District, Simon Meredith House, Stephen Meredith House, Nathan Michener House, and Townsend House are listed on the National Register of Historic Places.

== Geography ==
According to the United States Census Bureau, the township has a total area of 7.5 square miles (19 km^{2}), all land. The township is located in the Hopewell Big Woods.

There are three main historical and unincorporated villages within the township: Bucktown, Coventryville, and Pughtown.

It is the home of Owen J. Roberts School District's main campus, located at the intersection of Route 23 and Route 100.

== Demographics ==
Historical population
Census	Pop.	Note	%±
1930	589		—
1940	679		15.3%
1950	863		27.1%
1960	1,212		40.4%
1970	1,518		25.2%
1980	1,556		2.5%
1990	1,682		8.1%
2000	1,895		12.7%
2010	2,604		37.4%
2020	2,796		7.4%

At the 2010 census, the township was 95.5% non-Hispanic White, 0.5% Black or African American, 0.2% Native American, 1.0% Asian, and 1.2% were two or more races. 1.7% of the population were of Hispanic or Latino ancestry.

At the 2000 census, there were 1,895 people, 690 households and 529 families living in the township. The population density was 253.6 inhabitants per square mile (97.9/km^{2}). There were 721 housing units at an average density of 96.5 per square mile (37.3/km^{2}). The racial makeup of the township was 98.47% White, 0.63% African American, 0.16% Native American, 0.11% Asian, 0.21% from other races, and 0.42% from two or more races. Hispanic or Latino of any race were 0.69% of the population.

There were 690 households, of which 34.5% had children under the age of 18 living with them, 68.8% were married couples living together, 4.9% had a female householder with no husband present, and 23.3% were non-families. 18.6% of all households were made up of individuals, and 7.1% had someone living alone who was 65 years of age or older. The average household size was 2.69 and the average family size was 3.09.

Age distribution was 26.0% under the age of 18, 4.5% from 18 to 24, 30.8% from 25 to 44, 24.1% from 45 to 64, and 14.6% who were 65 years of age or older. The median age was 40 years. For every 100 females, there were 98.4 males. For every 100 females age 18 and over, there were 96.5 males.

The median household income was $62,857 and the median family income was $75,157. Males had a median income of $51,063 versus $33,482 for females. The per capita income for the township was $28,956. About 3.2% of families and 3.7% of the population were below the poverty line, including 1.0% of those under age 18 and 13.1% of those age 65 or over.

== Education ==
The township is in the Owen J. Roberts School District. Owen J. Roberts High School is the zoned comprehensive high school.

== Transportation ==
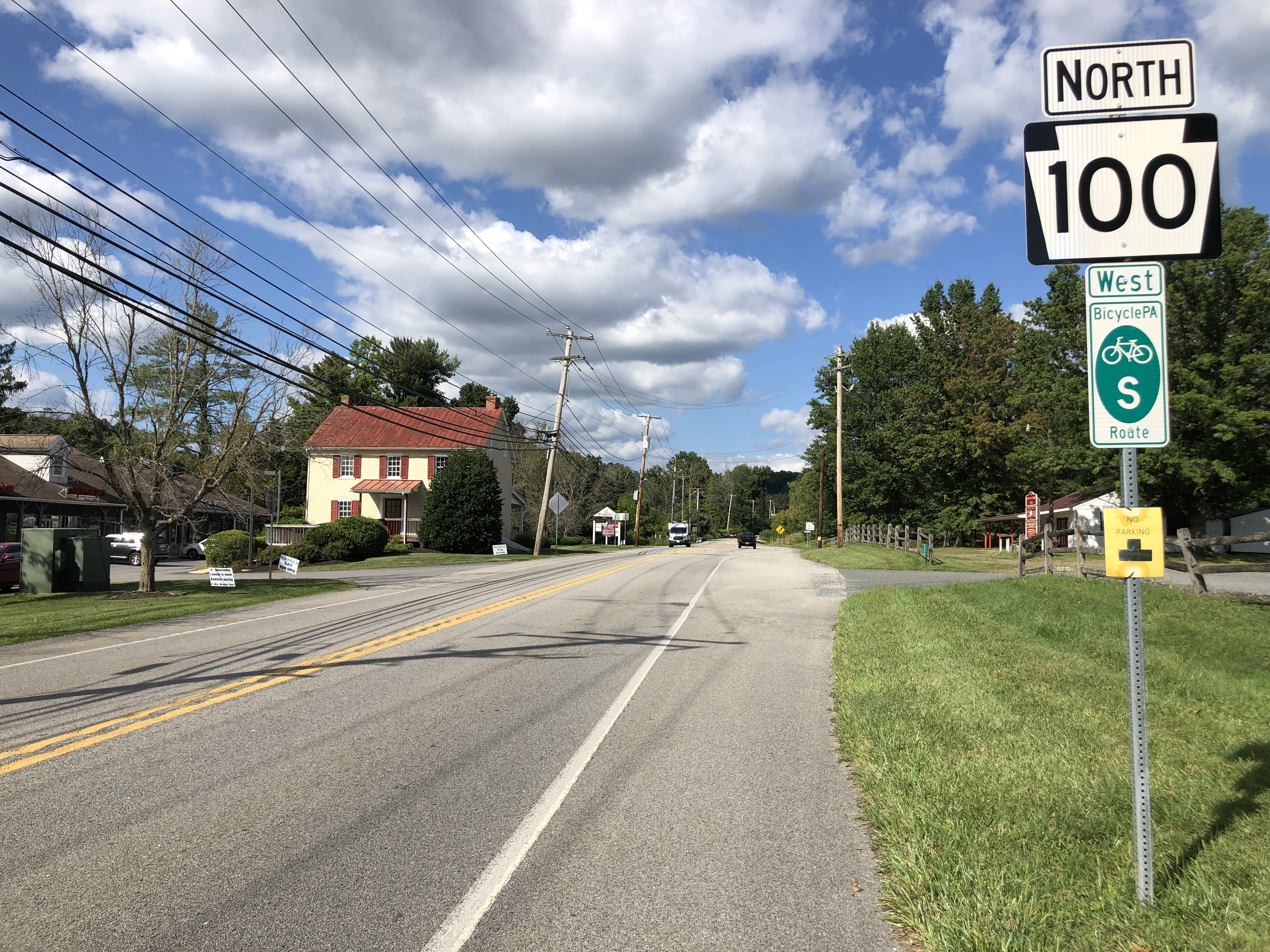
PA 100 northbound in South Coventry Township

As of 2019, there were 26.43 miles (42.53 km) of public roads in South Coventry Township, of which 9.12 miles (14.68 km) were maintained by the Pennsylvania Department of Transportation (PennDOT) and 17.31 miles (27.86 km) were maintained by the township.

Pennsylvania Route 23 and Pennsylvania Route 100 are the numbered roads serving South Coventry Township. PA 23 follows Ridge Road along an east-west alignment through the central portion of the township. PA 100 follows Pottstown Pike along a north-south alignment across the eastern portion of the township.
