= Transportation in Lancaster County, Pennsylvania =

Transportation in Lancaster County, Pennsylvania has a long and variegated history. An early-settled part of the United States, and lying on the route between Philadelphia and Harrisburg, it has been the site of early experiments in canals, railroads, and highways. Before all these, at least ten Native American paths crossed parts of the county, many connecting with the Susquehannock village of Conestoga.

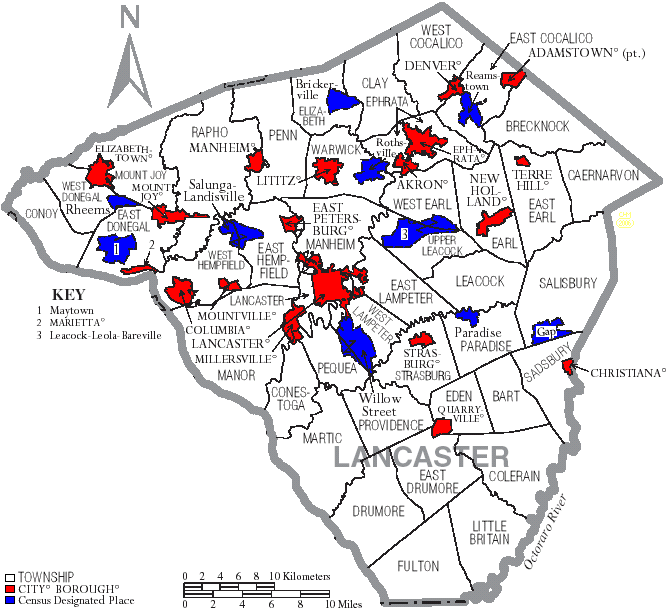
Map of Lancaster County, Pennsylvania today, showing City and Boroughs (red), Townships (white), and Census-designated places (blue).

== Canals ==
The principal waterway in Lancaster County is the Susquehanna River, which forms its western border. However, its many rocks and rapids made it difficult for navigation. An attempt was made in 1820 by James Hopkins to dig a canal to bypass the Conewago Falls, already bypassed in 1797 by the Conewago Canal in York County on the opposite side of the river. However, the Hopkins Canal was poorly laid out and not useful for navigation. He was then authorized by the legislature to build a canal along the Conestoga River to Lancaster to connect that city with the Susquehanna, but abandoned it after building one lock.

On March 3, 1825, the Conestoga Navigation Company was incorporated to make a second attempt at improving the Conestoga River. It was placed into operation in 1826. The Conestoga Navigation was 18 miles (29 km) long, with nine locks and dams, between Safe Harbor, at the mouth of the creek, and Lancaster.

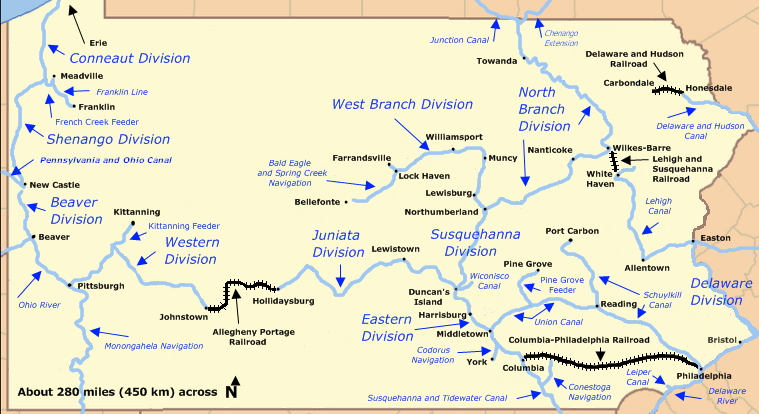
Map of historic Pennsylvania canals and connecting railroads; not all of the canals shown existed at the same time.

Interest in improving the Susquehanna continued. Surveys were made along the east bank from Chickies Rock to the Maryland state line in 1827; the extension of the Eastern Division of the Pennsylvania Canal to Columbia was authorized on March 24, 1828, and again on March 21, 1831, and was completed on December 4, 1832. Revenue service began on April 9, 1833. The construction of the Philadelphia and Columbia Railroad (vide infra) placed Columbia on the route from Philadelphia into the western parts of the state, via the canal. The Susquehanna and Tidewater Canal to Baltimore was ultimately opened in 1840 on the west side of the river, canal boats crossing at Columbia to reach the Pennsylvania Canal.

By this time, the Conestoga Navigation was already in financial difficulties, and was sold to the Lancaster & Susquehanna Slack-water Navigation Company. The newly built (1838) rail line from Harrisburg to Lancaster allowed westward trade to bypass the canals, and by 1849, the Eastern Division was entirely paralleled by rail. The state sold the Main Line of Public Works to the Pennsylvania Railroad in 1857, which kept the canals in desultory operation. The former Columbia Navigation last collected lock fees in 1872; its dams were later used for hydropower in the early 20th century. The last operating segment of the Pennsylvania Canal, from Columbia northward to Nanticoke, was abandoned on April 11, 1901.

Of the nine original Conestoga Navigation locks between Lancaster and the Susquehanna River, Lock 6 is the only survivor. Maintained by the Safe Harbor Water Power Corporation, it can be seen at Conestoga Creek Park near Safe Harbor. Railroad fill and construction has essentially obliterated the Pennsylvania Canal within the county.

== Railroads ==
=== Railroad history ===
The first railroad to pass through Lancaster County was the Philadelphia and Columbia Railroad, opened through Lancaster to the canal port of Columbia on March 31 or April 1, 1834. It was constructed by the state as part of the Main Line of Public Works, a combined rail and canal system connecting Philadelphia and Pittsburgh. In these early days, it was looked upon as a sort of public highway, and private horses and wagons that fit the gauge could be used on the line until 1844. Today this might be called open access.

The Philadelphia and Columbia quickly inspired connecting lines. In 1836, the Harrisburg, Portsmouth, Mount Joy and Lancaster Railroad (HPMt.J&L RR) built a connecting line from Dillerville, just west of Lancaster, to Mount Joy. Building from both ends, the line was completed from Dillerville to Harrisburg in 1838. This bypassed the canal between Harrisburg and Columbia. The P&C also encouraged the businessmen of Strasburg, who built the Strasburg Railroad from the Philadelphia and Columbia at Leaman Place to Strasburg in 1837. Transformed from a freight line to a tourist railroad in the 1950s, it is now one of the county's most popular tourist attractions.

In 1849, the HPMt.J&L RR was taken over by the Pennsylvania Railroad, then constructing an all-rail route across the state. It also bought the Marietta and Portsmouth Railroad, under whose charter it built a branch, paralleling the river and canal, from Royalton to Columbia. Besides the canal, the Philadelphia and Columbia (and the new branch from Royalton) connected to the Columbia-Wrightsville Bridge, which provided rail access to the Northern Central Railway via the Wrightsville, York and Gettysburg Railroad.

The PRR was forced to use the Philadelphia and Columbia between Dillerville and Philadelphia, and the sometimes lackadaisical operation of the state-run railroad proved burdensome and a bottleneck to traffic. In 1853, the PRR arranged to lease the Lancaster, Lebanon and Pine Grove Railroad, an as-yet unbuilt line from Philadelphia to Salunga via Phoenixville, and threatened to bypass the State line entirely. The threat, and intensive lobbying, was ultimately successful in persuading the Commonwealth to sell the entire Main Line of Public Works to the PRR in 1857. The PRR sold its interest in the LL&PG the following year, and the line would never be built.

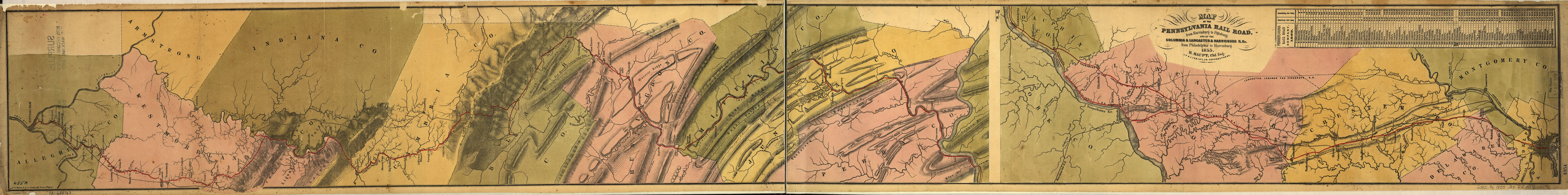
1855 map, including the planned Lancaster, Lebanon and Pine Grove Railroad and the Lancaster Pike road

The PRR also formally leased the HPMt.J&L RR in 1861, giving it complete control over its line from Philadelphia to Pittsburgh. This line would provide valuable service during the Civil War, particularly when the Philadelphia, Wilmington and Baltimore Railroad came under attack from Confederates and saboteurs or was simply jammed with traffic. Troops could be sent via the PRR to Columbia, cross the Columbia-Wrightsville Bridge, and ride down the Northern Central to Baltimore. However, Lee's invasion of Pennsylvania forced the state militia to retreat across the Columbia-Wrightsville Bridge and burn it behind them on June 28, 1863. While the destruction of the bridge saved the county from a Confederate invasion, it cut off access to the markets of York County, and it was not replaced until several years after the war.

During the Civil War, a new railroad appeared on the scene in Lancaster County. Controlled by the Philadelphia and Reading Rail Road, the Reading and Columbia Railroad built down from the Reading area to reach Columbia, crossing the PRR at Landisville, with a branch from Lancaster Jct. to Lancaster. The Columbia and Port Deposit Railroad also proposed to enter the county from the south, following the Susquehanna, but its construction was long stalled by inadequate funds and the difficult, rocky bluffs along the river.

While the principal arteries of the Lancaster County railroads had mostly been completed by this time, the Gilded Age witnessed a period of independent railroad construction, speculation, and financial maneuvers. The Lancaster and Reading Narrow Gauge Railroad was chartered in 1871 to build a 4 ft 0 in (1.22 m) gauge route from Safe Harbor to Lancaster to Reading, with a branch from Lancaster to Quarryville, competing with the Reading & Columbia. Construction began on the branch line to Quarryville, but was quickly changed to standard gauge. Hindered by the Panic of 1873, the company struck a deal with the Philadelphia & Reading to complete the line from Lancaster to Quarryville in return for control of the company, which it did in the following year. It thus became an extension of the Reading's Lancaster Branch. In 1876, the East Brandywine and Waynesburg Railroad built into the county from the east to reach the prosperous agricultural town of New Holland, and was promptly leased by the PRR. In 1877, the Columbia and Port Deposit, under control of the Philadelphia, Wilmington and Baltimore Railroad, finally finished its line into Columbia.

1878 saw the construction of one of the more implausible railroads of the area, the Peach Bottom Railway. Born of the "narrow-gauge fever" then sweeping the country, it was conceived as a 3 ft 0 in (0.91 m) gauge line from Philadelphia to the Broad Top coal fields. Surprisingly, the Eastern Division of the line was constructed from Oxford into Lancaster County, ending on the banks of the Susquehanna at Peach Bottom; no bridge was ever built to the Middle Division across the river, which would become the Maryland and Pennsylvania Railroad. Subsisting on sparse local traffic, the Eastern Division was sold at a bankruptcy auction in September 1881 and reorganized as the Peach Bottom Railroad. Another chimerical dream of this period was the Hanover Junction and Susquehanna Railroad. Intended to run from Landisville across the river to Hanover Junction on the Northern Central, it was reorganized in 1881 as the Reading, Marietta and Hanover Railroad, under the control of the Reading and Columbia, and produced only a short line built in 1883 from Marietta Jct. to the PRR's Columbia Branch at the foot of Chickies Rock and the dying iron furnaces there.

A more substantial result was achieved by the construction, in the same year, of the Cornwall and Mount Hope Railroad from the massive iron ore pits at Cornwall, in Lebanon County, to Mount Hope and a connection with the Reading & Columbia (which had built a spur there from Manheim a few years previous). It was controlled by the Cornwall Railroad, one of two competing lines from Cornwall to Lebanon; the other was the Cornwall and Lebanon Railroad, which set about its own southward extension at the same time. Its subsidiary, the Colebrook Valley Railroad completed a line from Cornwall to Conewago Jct., on the PRR main line, the following year. It was merged into the Cornwall & Lebanon in 1886.

In 1888, the East Brandywine & Waynesburg was foreclosed and reorganized as the Downingtown and Lancaster Railroad, still controlled by the PRR. It extended from New Holland into Lancaster in 1890, creating a rural bypass of the main line from Downingtown to Lancaster. About this time, the PRR faced a threat to its relative dominance in Lancaster County. The Peach Bottom was sold to a group of Lancaster businessmen and reorganized in 1890 as the Lancaster, Oxford and Southern Railroad. The new owners hoped to use it as part of a bridge line which would allow the Baltimore and Ohio Railroad to enter Lancaster. The B&O would build north from Childs to reach the Peach Bottom at Oxford. The Peach Bottom would be converted to standard gauge and build a branch from Fairmont to Quarryville. From there, B&O trains would travel over the Lancaster & Reading Narrow Gauge to reach Lancaster. However, the plan was foiled by the poor financial state of the companies involved. At the beginning of 1900, the PRR was able to gain control of the L&RNG from the Reading, scotching the plan. Despite the failure of the grand scheme, the LO&S built the Quarryville branch anyway in 1905. This ill-advised maneuver plunged it into debt from which it would never recover. The B&O completed its portion of the LO&S line to Providence, Maryland, where it served a paper plant. The line was removed in 1977.

One of the smaller lines in the county was built in 1902, when the Champion Iron and Separating Company built a spur from the Columbia and Port Deposit (by now a PRR branch) at Safe Harbor to reach their ore banks and concentrating mill near Marticville. Never successful, the company struggled along through foreclosures and reorganizations for a decade before abandonment in 1912.

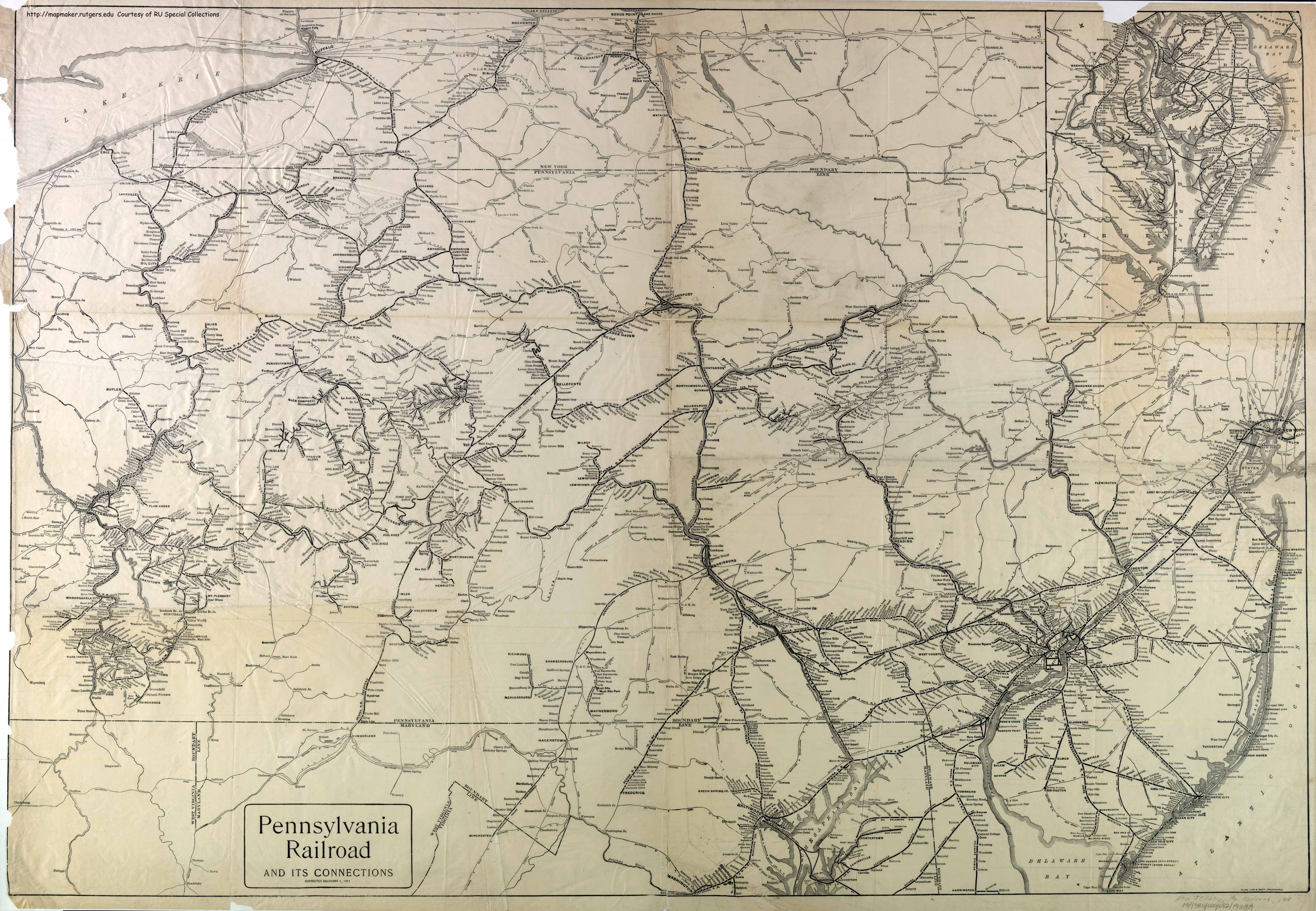
1911 map of Pennsylvania Railroad "Lines East" including Lancaster County

The turn of the century, however, was principally marked by the construction of the PRR's Atglen and Susquehanna Branch. This was part of the PRR's "Low-Grade Lines" project, which aimed to provide low-grade (slope) routes for freight which would bypass the congestion of major cities and the steeper grades of the Main Line. It was an engineering effort which would literally change the face of Lancaster County. With the goal of low grades always in mind, the new branch was surveyed through an empty area of southern Lancaster County, without significant industries. While it did pass near Quarryville, it did so on a high fill and did not descend to serve the town. Turning to parallel the Susquehanna River, the new route descended to join the Columbia and Port Deposit Branch at Creswell. At Columbia, the routes diverged again, with the new line following a parallel route straighter and closer to the river than the old line. At Marietta, the new line (under the York Haven and Rowenna Railroad charter) left the old line and the county, crossing the Susquehanna on the way to Enola. Construction of this branch required massive cuts and fills and two high bridges at Martic Forge and Safe Harbor. Most of the work, which took several years, was performed by H.S. Kerbaugh, an important PRR contractor. The line north of Marietta was opened first, on January 1, 1905, crossing Shocks Mills Bridge. The rest of the line opened on August 10, 1906, and the York Haven & Rowenna was merged into the PRR in the same year. It rapidly became a major freight route for the PRR.

This marked the high-water mark of railroading in Lancaster County. Consolidation and abandonment would soon ensure. The PRR bought up the Cornwall & Lebanon in 1913, and it was merged into the PRR in 1918, becoming the Lebanon Branch. The hapless Lancaster, Oxford & Southern, in and out of bankruptcy since 1910, scrapped its Quarryville branch in 1917. The rest of the railroad ceased operation in 1918, and the equipment was sold the next year. One oddity did appear in 1923: Samuel Strause opened a 3 ft 0 in (0.91 m) gauge logging operation at Penryn Park, a short portion of which extended into Lancaster County to transfer timber to the Cornwall & Mount Hope RR for shipment. This was Lancaster County's only logging line, and was sporadically active until 1936, being scrapped in 1941.

In 1930, with the iron industry at Chickies long played out, the Reading's Marietta Branch was abandoned. However, the railroad network in Lancaster County thereafter remained relatively stable until the general decline of the Northeastern railroads in the 1960s. The Cornwall & Mount Hope, long out of use, was abandoned in 1964, and part of the Mount Hope spur followed in 1971. With the formation of Conrail in 1976 and the transfer of the PRR Main Line to Amtrak, major abandonments of little-used lines began. The Lebanon Branch and the Quarryville Branch both went at its formation, although a steep spur was built off the Atglen & Susquehanna Branch at Quarryville to reach a stub of the old branch to New Providence. The remainder of the Mount Hope spur soon followed, as did the remaining stub of the Quarryville Branch, the New Holland Branch east of East Earl, and the Reading and Columbia from Lancaster Jct. to Columbia and from Lititz to Akron, all by 1982. The Reading and Columbia from Landisville to Bruckarts did survive, being sold to the Landisville Terminal and Transfer Company, operating off a new connection with the Amtrak line at Landisville. In 1984, the Reading and Columbia was further trimmed back from Akron to Stevens, near Ephrata. The final, major abandonment of the Conrail years was that of the Atglen & Susquehanna Branch from Safe Harbor to Lenover in 1989. Conrail's decision to divert Philadelphia-bound freight over the former Lebanon Valley Branch and Reading Company main line (to avoid interference with Amtrak) had left it with little or no traffic.

=== Current railroads ===
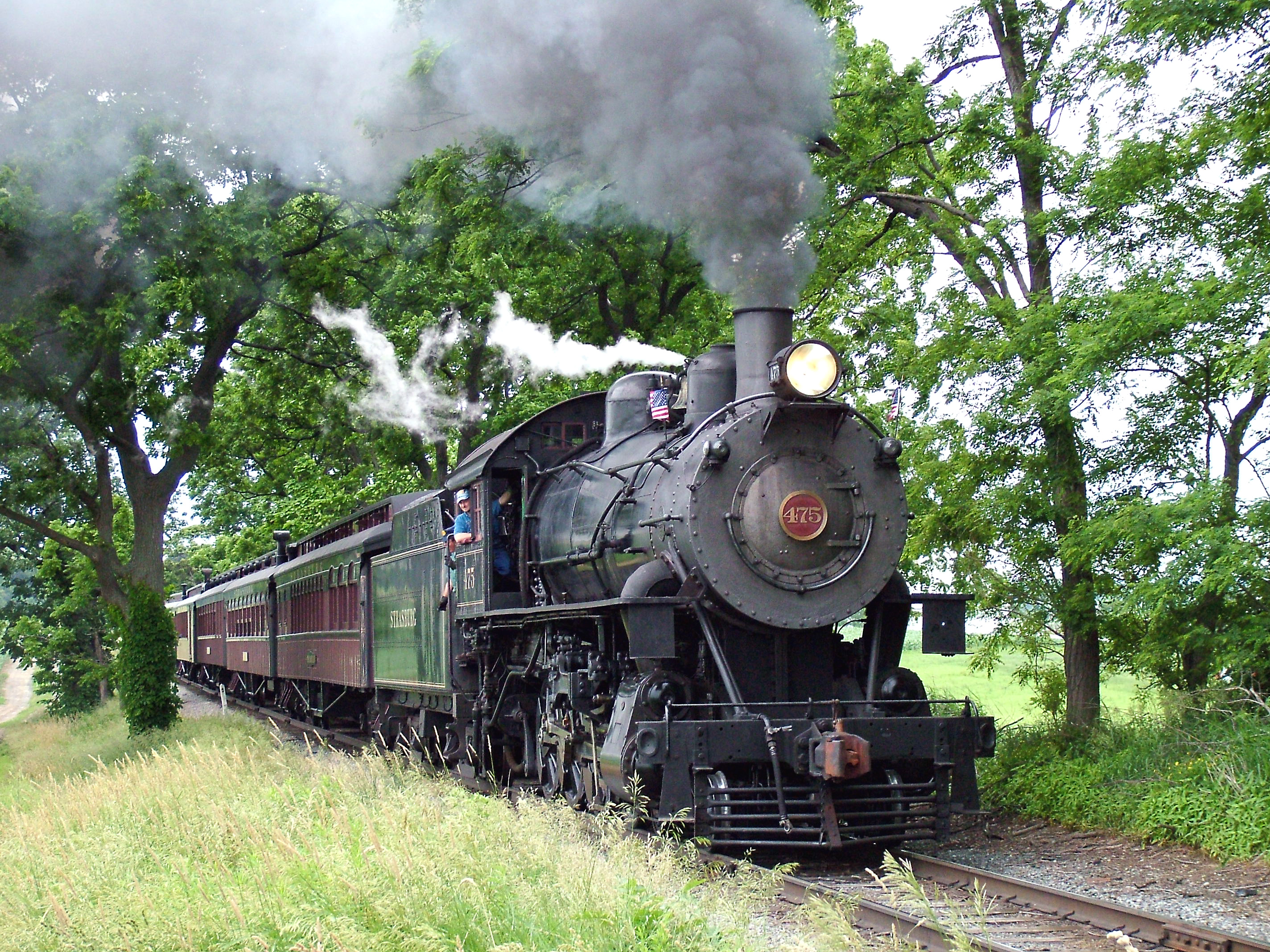
Strasburg Railroad #475

As of 2010, passenger service in Lancaster County is provided by Amtrak, whose Keystone Corridor passes through the county, with stops at Lancaster, Mount Joy and Elizabethtown. A station has been discussed for the town of Paradise to provide connecting service with the Strasburg Railroad, which runs passenger excursions from nearby Leaman Place to Strasburg, but this is no longer being planned as of 2021.

The principal freight operator in the county is Norfolk Southern Railway (NS), as successor to Conrail in 1999. The NS main line follows the Susquehanna River (with trackage rights for Canadian Pacific Railway (CPR)), and leaves the county by crossing the river on Shocks Mills Bridge near Marietta. NS also has trackage rights over the Keystone Corridor, to which it is connected by the Royalton Branch, which runs north along the river from the main line at Marietta, and the Columbia Branch, which runs from the Corridor at Dillerville to the main line at Columbia. Two other NS branches originate on the Corridor: the Lititz Secondary, which runs from Dillerville to Manheim and ends at Lititz, and the New Holland Industrial, which leaves the Corridor around the east end of Lancaster to run east to New Holland and ends at East Earl.

Several short lines also operate in the county. With the exception of the Strasburg Railroad, all are freight railroads. The East Penn Railroad (ESPN) operates on a spur off the NS branch to Manheim, and on a longer line in the northeast corner of Lancaster County into Berks County. Landisville Terminal and Transfer Company (LNTV) operates on a spur off the Amtrak line at Landisville. The Tyburn Railroad (TYBR) operates some trackage around Dillerville. Most recently, the Columbia and Reading Railway (CORY) began operating on 2.5 miles (4.0 km) of track in Columbia in January 2010. Excepting the Tyburn Railroad, all of these lines operated over former Reading & Columbia trackage.

=== Trolleys ===
The principal trolley company in Lancaster County was the Conestoga Traction Company. Conestoga Traction was an interurban trolley system that operated seven country routes radiating spoke-like from Lancaster, Pennsylvania, to numerous villages and towns. It ran side-of-road trolleys through Amish farm country to Coatesville, Strasburg/Quarryville, Pequea, Columbia/Marietta, Elizabethtown, Manheim/Lititz, and Ephrata/Adamstown/Terre Hill. By its connections to adjacent interurban trolley companies such as Philadelphia and West Chester (later Red Arrow and now today's SEPTA route 101), West Chester Street Railway, Schuylkill Valley Traction, Reading Transit, Hershey Transit, and Harrisburg Railways, one could ride trolleys from Philadelphia to Harrisburg, although slowly. This could be accomplished by two circuitous routes. The southern route went via West Chester-Coatesville-Lancaster-Hershey and the northern route via Norristown-Pottstown-Reading-Ephrata-Lebanon-Hershey. In the early part of the 1900s, Conestoga Traction was relatively fast and reliable transportation between towns in the days of horse-drawn wagons and buggies using rutted and muddy dirt roads. CT also transported products such as milk and produce from farm to town. With its connection to Hershey Transit, milk was shipped by trolley to the Hershey chocolate factory. Most interurbans like CT did not survive paved highways and the Great Depression. The Conestoga Traction Manheim line, for example, was abandoned in 1932. City service in Lancaster continued until 1947. A single CT car is preserved in working condition by the Manheim Historical Society, who operate it on a short stretch of track in their parking lot.

== Bus transit ==
The Red Rose Transit Authority is a transit agency operating buses serving Lancaster County, and is headquartered in downtown Lancaster. York County's Rabbit Transit connects Columbia with the East York Mall Monday through Friday. A Saturday-only bus run by Lebanon Transit connects Park City Mall with the nearby city of Lebanon. Intercity bus service to New York is provided by OurBus on select days.

== Native American paths ==
Ten or more Native American paths (or trails) are known to have passed through what is today Lancaster County. While none of these paths are still in existence, the routes they took were often followed by later roads, canals, and railroads.

=== Conestoga paths ===
Many of these paths were connected with the Susquehannock people, whose main village was Conestoga (meaning at the place of the immersed pole), in what is now Manor Township in Lancaster County. The village of Conestoga thrived from 1690 to 1740, and was a center of trade with settlers as early as 1696. William Penn, James Logan, and four colonial governors of Pennsylvania visited Conestoga. Conestoga is another name used for the Susquehannocks (primarily in Pennsylvania), while Susquehannock is used more in Maryland and points south.

Conestoga was located north of the Conestoga River and east of the Susquehanna River, about 4 miles (6 km) southwest of the borough of Millersville. Washington Boro to the northwest is the closest modern village to the location of Conestoga, while the village of Safe Harbor lies to the south (at the confluence of the Conestoga River with the Susquehanna). Today the hamlet of Indiantown is probably at the actual location of Conestoga.

From the village of Conestoga, six or seven paths led in several directions.

The Great Minquas Path went east from Conestoga to the Dutch, Swedish, and later British settlements in the Philadelphia and Chester area. Minquas is the Dutch name for the Susquehannocks (from the Lenape for treacherous). The path went east by way of Rockhill (at the ford of the Conestoga River) to Willow Street, Strasburg, and Gap, then entered Chester County. There it continued east via Atglen, Parkesburg, Mortonville, and Gradyville, crossed into Delaware County and there led through Morton and Lima, where it could go south to Chester or east to Darby, and finally to Philadelphia. Parts of U.S. Route 222 and Pennsylvania Route 741 follow the path in Lancaster County. At its eastern end, numerous branches of the path led to Chester, Philadelphia and other nearby destinations. This path was also sometimes known as the Conestoga Path.

The Conestoga - Newport Path followed the Great Minquas Path to Gap, where it branched off and led southeast to Newport, Delaware (on the Christina River). Pennsylvania Route 41 and State Route 41 (Delaware) follow the route of the path from Gap southeast to Newport today.

The French Creek Path led northeast from Conestoga along the Conestoga River to Lancaster, then east to Phoenixville in Chester County. From Lancaster the path followed the Conestoga River to Eden then left the river and went east through New Holland and Blue Ball, before entering Berks County, where it passed through Morgantown. It then entered Chester County and went through Elverson and Warwick to French Creek, which it followed to Bucktown and finally Phoenixville (on the Schuylkill River). Pennsylvania Route 999 follows the course of this path to Lancaster, and Pennsylvania Route 23 continues from there to Phoenixville. As much of this path follows the Conestoga River and French Creek, it is possible it paralleled a canoe path with a portage between these two streams.

The Blue Rock Path, according to a separate tradition, followed the French Creek Path closely from Phoenixville west to Conestoga (and may be the same path). From Conestoga, the Blue Rock Path went west to the Susquehanna River and crossed it at a ford south of modern Washington Boro, going west to York County.

The Monocacy Path led west from Conestoga across the Susquehanna River to York, then southwest to Hanover, then into Maryland and Frederick there (on the Monocacy River). From Frederick one could continue southwest to the Cumberland Gap and Kentucky or into Virginia. This path was also sometimes known as the Conestoga Path in Pennsylvania and the Susquehanna Path in Maryland. The Blue Rock Path was either a connector to, or extension of this path. U.S. Route 30 to York, Pennsylvania Route 116 to Hanover, and Pennsylvania Route 194 to the Maryland State line follow the Monocacy Path in Pennsylvania today.

The Paxtang Path went north from Conestoga along the Susquehanna River to Paxtang (modern Harrisburg), then mostly followed the river north to the village of Shamokin at modern Sunbury. In Lancaster County it went through Washington Boro and Columbia, past Chickies Rock, through Marietta, Bainbridge (and the Native American village of Conoy there), and Falmouth, before entering Dauphin County and continuing on to Paxtang. The Pennsylvania Canal and Pennsylvania Railroad ran along the river here, and the Norfolk Southern rail line still does. In Lancaster County today, Pennsylvania Route 441 leads to Royalton, Pennsylvania in Dauphin County along the path's route and from Royalton Pennsylvania Route 230 leads to Harrisburg (formerly Paxtang). Heading north from Paxtang, the path ended at the village of Shamokin, where the Susquehanna River forks. The Great Shamokin Path along the West Branch Susquehanna River led to western Pennsylvania, the Allegheny River, and eventually Ohio. The Great Warriors Path followed the main or North Branch of the Susquehanna River north to modern day Wilkes-Barre and Scranton, then north to New York state and the Five (later Six) Nations of the Iroquois there.

=== Peach Bottom paths ===
An unnamed path led south from Conestoga along the Susquehanna River to a Native American village at modern Peach Bottom in the southwest corner of Lancaster County. Peach Bottom is in Fulton Township, on the Susquehanna River just north of Maryland and the Mason–Dixon line. In addition to the path south from Conestoga, two other paths met here.

The Peach Bottom Path led west and slightly north from Peach Bottom to the village of Hayesville, in Chester County. From Peach Bottom the path went through Wakefield, Oakryn, Little Britain, Oak Hill, Tayloria, and crossed Octoraro Creek into Chester County at Pine Grove. From there it continued west via Tweedale to Hayesville, where it connected to the Nanticoke Path running north from Calvert, Maryland to Nanticoke, Pennsylvania. Pennsylvania Route 272 follows the path from Wakefield to Oak Hill.

The New Castle Path ran from Peach Bottom east to New Castle, Delaware, and was sometimes known as the Susquehanna Path. James Logan traveled this path in 1705 to Peach Bottom and north to Conestoga on his first visit there, as did Governor John Evans.

=== Conoy paths ===
From circa 1718 to 1743 there was a Native American village called Conoy (at the modern village of Bainbridge) in Conoy Township. The village was at the mouth of Conoy Creek on the Susquehanna River in the northwest corner of Lancaster County. The Paxtang Path ran through here, and two other paths met at Conoy as well.

Old Peter's Road went from the village of Conoy (modern Bainbridge) east to the village of Downington in Chester County. The name comes from Peter Bezaillon, who had a trading post and 700 acres (2.8 km^{2}) at Conoy by 1719. The road was laid out in 1718 on Bezaillon's bridle path, which followed an old Native American path. From Bainbridge, the path went northeast through Donegal Springs and Mount Joy to Lancaster Junction, where it forded Chiques Creek. Continuing east, it formed the boundary between the following sets of townships: Penn and East Hempfield, Warwick and Manheim, and West Earl and Upper Leacock. Fording Conestoga River just south of the mouth of Cocalico Creek, the path led east to Center Square, Springville, and White Horse. Crossing into Chester County, it passed through Compass, Wagontown, Siousca, and Thorndale, and reached Downington on the East Branch of Brandywine Creek. U.S. Route 30, Pennsylvania Route 340, Pennsylvania Route 897, Pennsylvania Route 283, and Pennsylvania Route 230 all follow parts of Old Peter's Road. For a time it was "the main artery between Philadelphia and the west".

The Conoy Path led west from modern Bainbridge across the Susquehanna River to modern Carlisle in Cumberland County. From Conoy the path followed the Paxtang Path north to a ford at the Conewago Falls in the Susquehanna River, where it crossed west to York Haven at the mouth of Conewago Creek in York County. There it headed west and slightly north, through Newberrytown, fording Yellow Breeches Creek into Cumberland County near Lisburn. There it led west through Bowmansdale to the village of Letort's Spring, modern Carlisle. There was a connection there to the east–west Allegheny Path from Harrisburg to Pittsburgh. The path is sometimes also known as the Conewago Path and the part in Lancaster County is sometimes seen as an extension of Old Peter's Road.

== Highways ==
=== Current highways ===
- I-76 / Penna Turnpike
- US 30
- US 222
- US 322
- PA 10
- PA 23
- PA 41
- PA 72
- PA 230
- PA 241
- PA 272
- PA 283
- PA 324
- PA 340
- PA 372
- PA 441
- PA 462
- PA 472
- PA 501
- PA 625
- PA 722
- PA 741
- PA 741 Truck
- PA 743
- PA 772
- PA 896
- PA 897
- PA 999

== Airports ==
The Lancaster Airport was opened on August 17, 1935, with commercial service beginning on March 28, 1949, via All American Airways, now known as US Airways Express. Currently operated by The Lancaster Airport Authority, the facility can be found at 500 Airport Road in Lititz. The airport has had difficulty maintaining commercial service, due to low passenger volume. As of September 2007 commercial flights accounted for only 1 percent of traffic and less than 3 percent of revenue. An 18-month lapse in service occurred in 2003 and 2004. In 2007, the federal government awarded $1.37 million in subsidies (via the Essential Air Service program) to Air Midwest, in an attempt to maintain service. Despite the heavy subsidies, Air Midwest ended service on September 30, 2007, the day that its contract with the Lancaster Airport expired.

Smoketown Airport, a public airport which serves general aviation traffic, is located 6.3 miles (10.1 km) east of Lancaster. Larger and better served airports are within a short distance of Lancaster. Harrisburg International Airport is within a 30-minute Amtrak train ride or a 45-minute drive of the city of Lancaster. Philadelphia International Airport is within a 60-minute Amtrak train ride or a 1-hour, 30 minute drive of the city of Lancaster.

== See also ==
- List of canals in the United States
- Transportation in Lycoming County, Pennsylvania
