= Enola Branch =

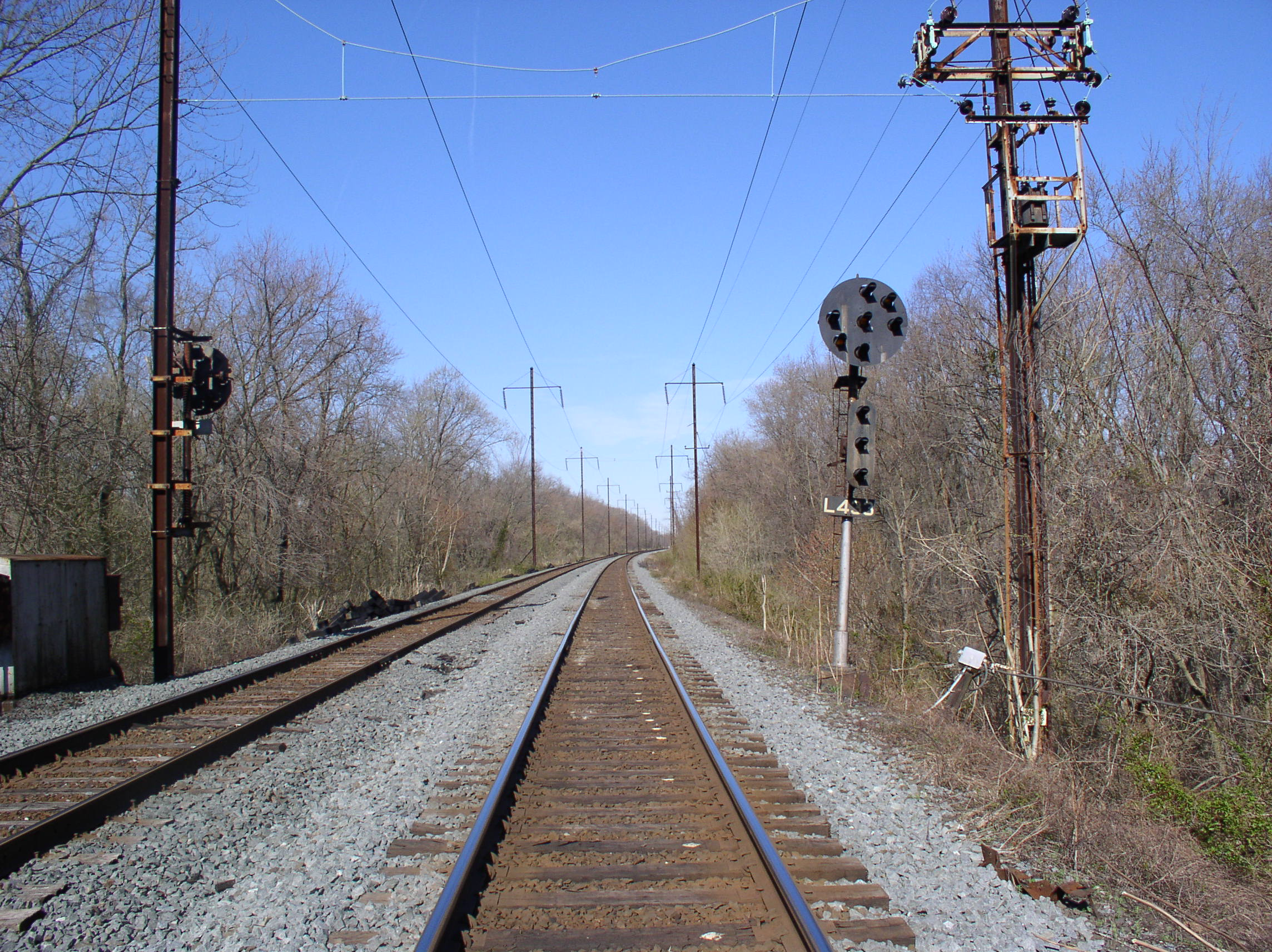
Enola Branch

The Enola Branch is a rail line segment of the Port Road Branch and was a rail line. The Enola Branch rail line segment and the rest of the Port Road Branch is owned and operated by the Norfolk Southern Railway in the U.S. state of Pennsylvania. The rail line segment runs from Washington Boro northwest to Marysville and it is a former Pennsylvania Railroad rail line. Its south end is at a former junction with the Atglen and Susquehanna Branch, where the main segment of the Port Road Branch continues southeast. Its north end is at the Pittsburgh Line. Along the way, it meets the York Secondary at Wago Junction (near York Haven) and goes under the Lurgan Branch at Lemoyne. Norfolk Southern labels the Enola Branch as part of the Port Road Branch, officially ending the Enola Branch's existence as a rail line. The main segment of the Port Road Branch runs from Marysville south to Perryville, Maryland. The line goes through the Enola Yard.

== History ==
The York and Cumberland Railroad opened the line from York north to Lemoyne in 1851; this is part of the current Enola Branch rail line segment north of Wago Junction. The Northern Central Railway extended the line north to Dauphin in 1858; this extension south of Marysville is now the Enola Branch railroad segment.

The Columbia and Port Deposit Railroad opened in 1877, including the Enola Branch rail line segment south of Columbia. The York Haven and Rowenna Railroad opened the Shocks Mills Bridge and connecting trackage in 1905, running from Rowenna northwest to Wago Junction. The final piece of the Enola Branch rail line segment opened in 1906, with the completion of the Atglen and Susquehanna Branch to Rowenna. The entire Enola Branch property became part of the Pennsylvania Railroad, Penn Central and Conrail through leases, mergers, and takeovers, and in the 1999 breakup of Conrail it was assigned to Norfolk Southern.
