= Transportation in Lycoming County, Pennsylvania =

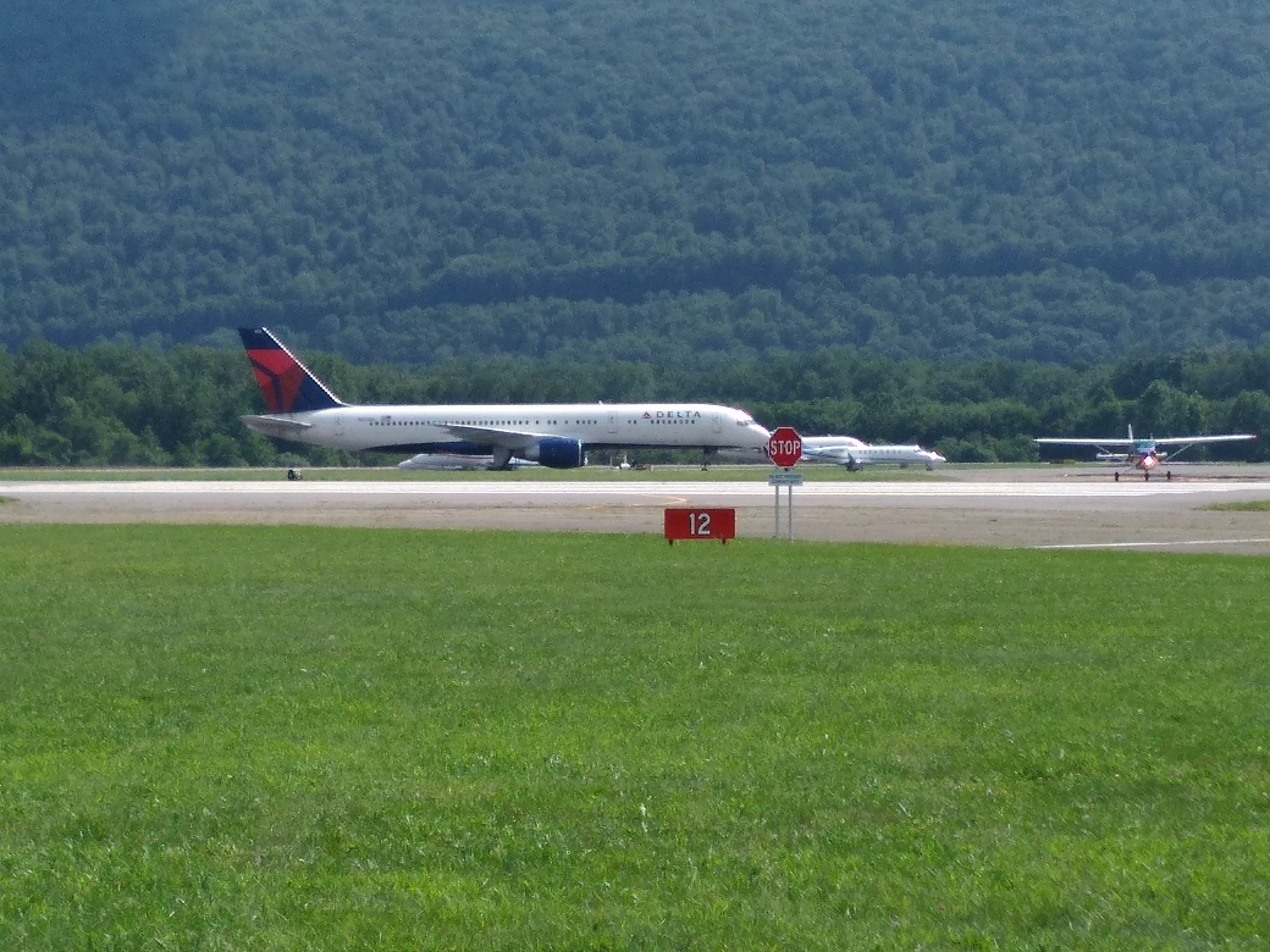
A Delta Air Lines Boeing 757 at Williamsport Regional Airport, the airport is the areas main travel hub

Transportation in Lycoming County, Pennsylvania has a long and varied history. The area was settled in the mid-1700s. Transportation was mostly using the Susquehanna River and railroad as Williamsport was a travel hub or center for Central Pennsylvania.

Modern transportation includes aviation, infrastructure such as roadways, bridges and highways.

== Transportation demographics ==
Transportation to work as of 2011
1. Drive (73.0%)
2. Public Transportation (13.0%)
3. Walk or bike (9.00%)
4. Other (5.00%)

In an online poll done by the Williamsport Sun Gazette a majority (approx. 73%) of residents in Lycoming County 25 years of age and up get to work in a vehicle. 13% uses public transportation, 9% walk or bike to work and 5% other modes of transportation.

79% of 500 Lycoming county residents interviewed said that they have used public transportation at least once, and 73% of riders say they are happy with service. "Service" includes, fair prices, time and bus interior condition (trash on floor, broken seats etc.)

== Transportation infrastructure ==
=== Bridges ===
- Carl E. Stotz Memorial Little League Bridge formerly Market Street Bridge
- Maynard Street Bridge
- Arch Street Bridge
- Broad Street Bridge; also known as The Green Bridge
- Loyalsock Creek Railroad Bridge
- Multiple Bridges for Interstate 180 and US 15

=== Roadways ===
Over 3,500 miles of roadways throughout the county.

== Railroads ==
=== History ===
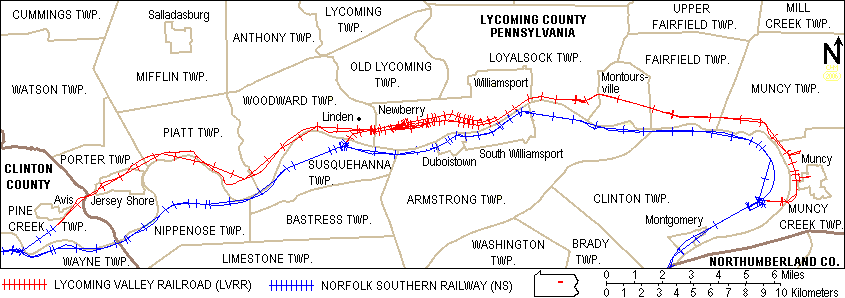
Map of the Lycoming Valley Railroad (red) and Norfolk Southern Railway (blue) lines in Lycoming County.

Vast stands of timber and nearby coal deposits brought three early railroads to the Williamsport and Lycoming County area. After drifting logs down the West Branch Susquehanna River became impractical. Transporting logs and other goods by rail was faster and more business-friendly. After the logging boom from 1880 to 1930 the area railroads were used for passenger lines connecting Williamsport to Philadelphia, State College, Pittsburgh, Allentown and the Wilkes Barre-Scranton area.

The areas rail lines schedule has decreased in the past 25 years. As of 2011 <10 daily train movements in Lycoming County (excl. inter-county rail operations accounts for <5 daily rail movement).

== Highways ==
=== Current highways ===
Highways in Lycoming County include Pennsylvania State Routes: 14, 42, 44, 87, 184, 284, 287, 405, 442, 554, 654, 864, 880, 973. U.S. Routes: 15 and 220. Also Interstate I-180.

=== Major roadways ===
The following are major roadways in Lycoming County:

- Broad Street; Montoursville
- East Third Street; Williamsport and Loyalsock Township
- Market Street; Williamsport
- South Market Street; South Williamsport
- Haststings Street; South Williamsport
- Four Mile Dr.; Loyalsock Township
- Northway Road; Loyalsock Township
- West Southern Ave; South Williamsport

== Airports ==
There is one airport in Lycoming. Williamsport Regional Airport is a fully operational public airport with daily commercial flights. The airport serves Williamsport, Pennsylvania and the surrounding Lycoming County area and serves about 25,000 annual passengers. The airport is located five miles east of Williamsport, in Lycoming County, Pennsylvania. It is owned by the Williamsport Municipal Airport Authority.

=== Passenger numbers ===
Year	Passengers	Change	Airline
2009	19,753	N/A	US Airways Express
2010	22,457	▲13.7%	US Airways Express
2011	24,401	▲8.7%	US Airways Express
2012	25,949	▲6.3%	US Airways Express
2013	23,194	▼10.6%	US Airways Express
2014	24,645	▲6.3%	US Airways Express
2015	21,886	▼11.2%	American Eagle
2016	N/A	-	American Eagle

== Growth and continued expansion ==
=== Airport ===
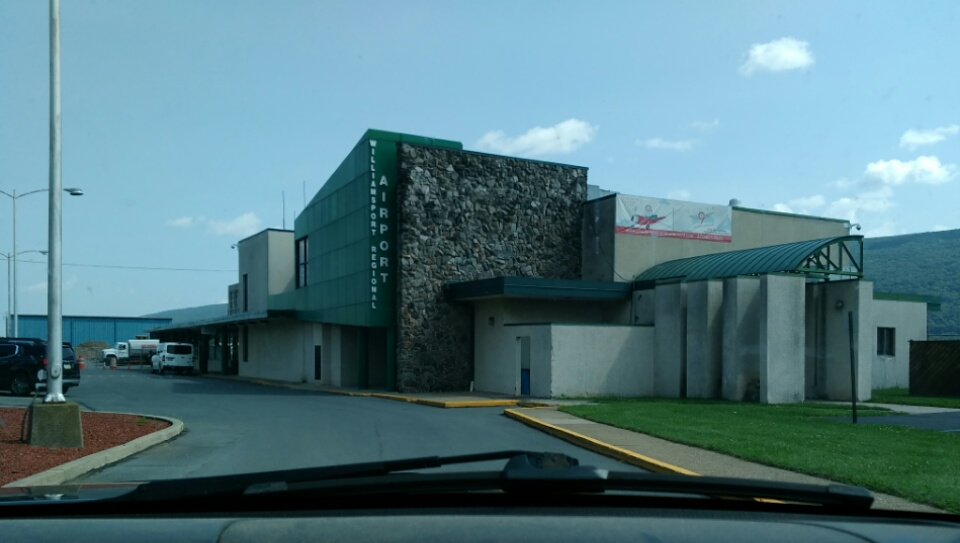
Existing terminal (1954–2018) that will be torn down in 2018 when replaced with new, modern terminal building.

Williamsport Regional Airport received a $19 million expansion budget paid for by the Williamsport Municipal Airport Authority, local, state and federal governments to replace the old terminal and air-side improvements.

Other improvements other that the terminal include. Upgrades to the instrument landing system and runway safety area. Construction of a parallel taxiway, re-marking of the airfield to adhere to FAA directives. Construction of new taxiway “C” to the terminal ramp and upgrades to the airfield taxiways lighting system.

=== Roadways ===
Williamsport and county authorities along with PennDOT created a master plan through the year 2025. Which includes up-keep, construction and re-construction of area, highways and roadways.

=== Public transit ===
In 2015 the River Valley Transit Corp. introduce the new Trade and Transit II and upgrades to its bus terminal in downtown Williamsport. Also additions to bus routes and new natural gas busses with a cleaner burn. Which then produces reduced prices for riders.
