= Shocks Mills Bridge =

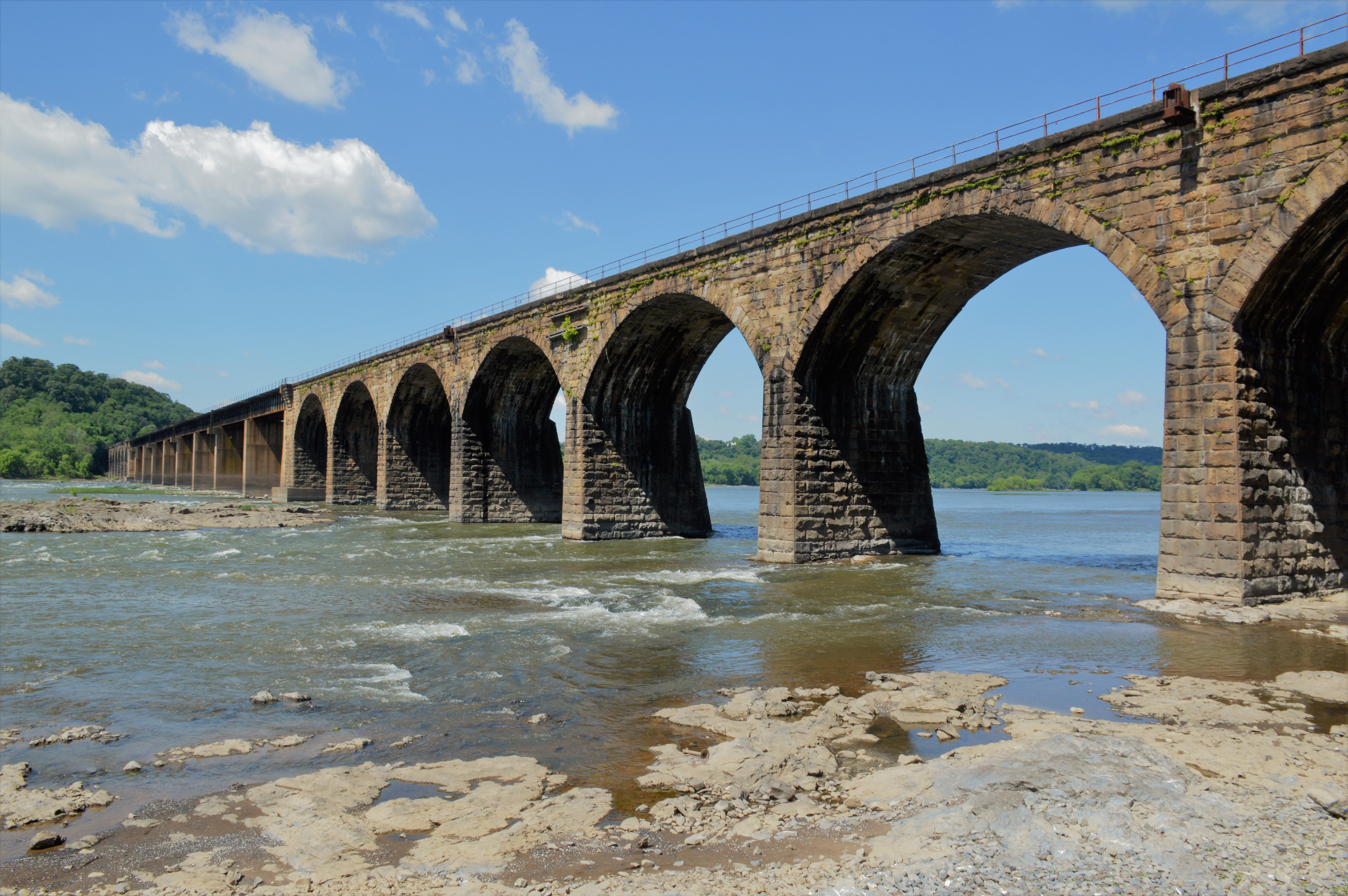
- Coordinates: 40°03′42″N 76°38′14″W
- Carries: Norfolk Southern Railway
- Crosses: Susquehanna River
- Locale: Wago Junction, Pennsylvania and Marietta, Pennsylvania

Characteristics
- Design: brick arch; replacement center sections concrete and steel
- Total length: 2209 feet

History
- Opened: January 1, 1905

Statistics
- Toll: none

Shocks Mills Bridge carries tracks of the Norfolk Southern Railway (formerly the Atglen and Susquehanna Branch of the Pennsylvania Railroad) over the Susquehanna River between Marietta, Pennsylvania and Wago Junction, Pennsylvania.

== Construction ==
During the early 20th century, the PRR constructed what it referred to as its "Low-Grade Lines", branches constructed with a minimal grade to divert freight traffic from its congested and steeper main lines. One of these new lines was the Atglen and Susquehanna Branch, which left the Main Line at Parkesburg to cut cross-county to the Susquehanna River, followed the east bank of the river to Marietta, crossed the river and ran along the west bank to Wago Junction, where it met the Northern Central Railway. The line from Marietta to Wago Junction was chartered as the York Haven and Rowenna Railroad, and much of the construction, including the crossing of the Susquehanna at Shocks Mills, was done by H.S. Kerbaugh, a major PRR contractor. The bridge was first opened on January 1, 1905, as a twenty-eight span brick arch.

== Damage from Hurricane Agnes and repair ==
The bridge was closed during the flooding caused by Hurricane Agnes in late June 1972. Penn Central's commuter train service between Lancaster and Harrisburg was affected by the damages to the bridge, and freight traffic to Harrisburg was required to be re-routed. In August of that year, the federal bankruptcy court, overseeing the reorganization of Penn Central, gave the railroad permission to make repairs to the span, a process that was expected to take "four or five months".
