= Atglen and Susquehanna Branch =

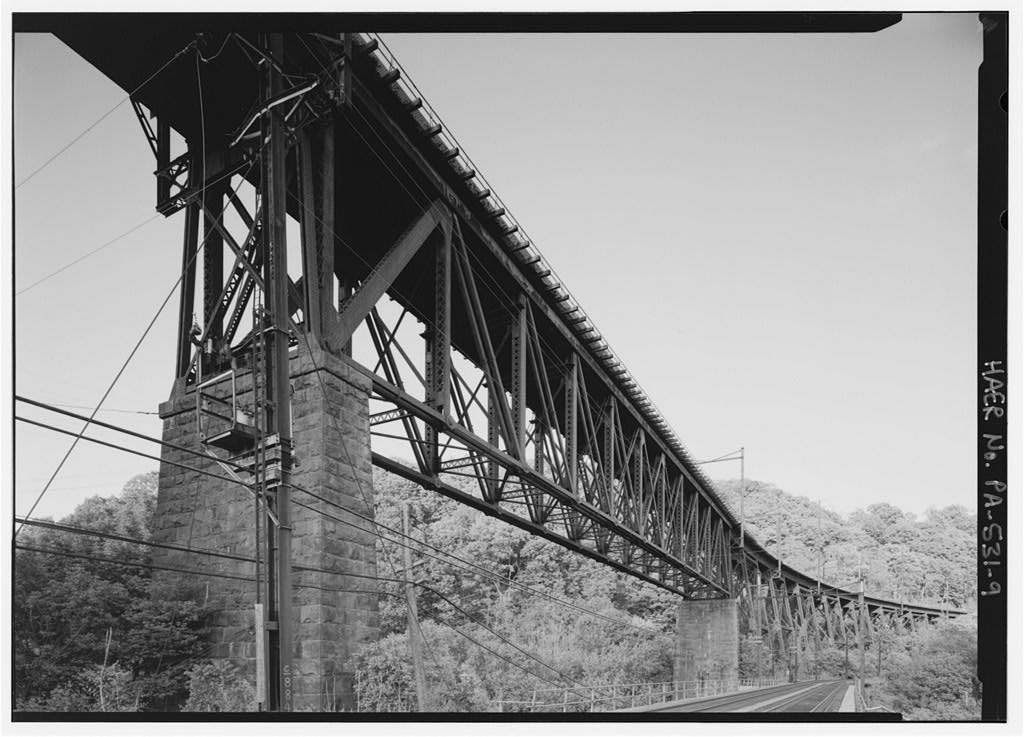
The Atglen and Susquehanna Branch crosses the Conestoga River on the upper span of this bridge, located at the Safe Harbor Dam, Pennsylvania.

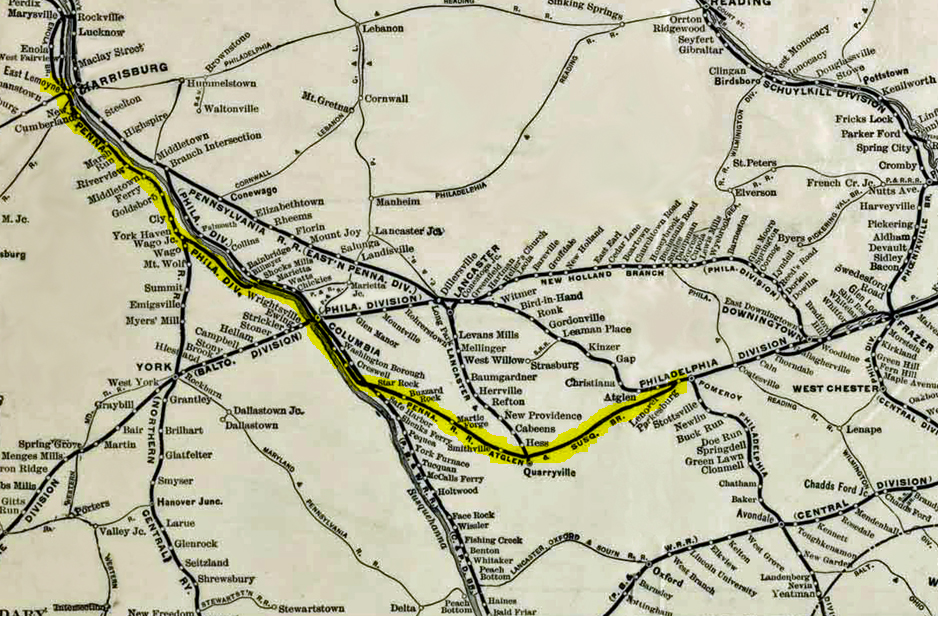
Map of the A&S Branch in 1911

The Atglen and Susquehanna Branch is an abandoned branch line of the Pennsylvania Railroad that ran between Lemoyne and Atglen, Pennsylvania. A portion of the line is now the Enola Low Grade Trail.

== History ==
The Atglen and Susquehanna (A&S) Branch was built by the Pennsylvania Railroad (PRR) between 1902 and 1906. The branch was built to relieve congestion on the Philadelphia to Harrisburg Main Line and the railroad's Columbia & Port Deposit (C&PD) line. With freight service on the Main Line hampered by relatively steep grades, the A&S Branch—which was specifically designed with minimal grades and curves—was often known simply as the "Low Grade".

During construction of the A&S Branch, the existing C&PD stone bridge at the Conestoga River washed out. Rather than rebuild, the C&PD bridge was combined with the A&S bridge to form a unique two-line, two-level steel viaduct known as the Safe Harbor Trestle. This bridge at the Conestoga carried the C&PD line over the river, while the A&S ran parallel and approximately 100 feet (30 m) above.

Construction was completed and the line opened by July 1906.

When combined with the railroad's Trenton Cutoff and Philadelphia & Thorndale Branch, the new line permitted the PRR to operate a low-grade bypass between Morrisville, Pennsylvania (just south of Trenton, New Jersey) and Harrisburg. This allowed freight trains to avoid the congestion of the eastern seaboard and the steep grades of the Main Line.

The line flourished with freight traffic until the decline of northeast railroads and overall reduction in traffic made the line redundant. The line survived PRR's short-lived successor Penn Central (1968–1976) and into the era of the PC's successor, Conrail. Conrail downgraded the line, removing the overhead catenary and later rerouting traffic over the former Reading Company's line between Harrisburg and northern New Jersey. The last train ran on the line in 1988. Conrail petitioned the Interstate Commerce Commission to abandon the line in 1989 and track was removed around 1990.

While the track had been removed prior to the 1999 breakup of Conrail by the Norfolk Southern (NS) and CSX, the right-of-way was retained due to disputes over the historical nature of the line's bridges and passed to NS. A group called Friends of the Atglen–Susquehanna Trail proposed using the line as a rail trail, which was opposed by local residents and ultimately failed. In July 2008, NS sold a portion of the abandoned line to eight municipalities, charging each $1 and supplying a total of $1.4 million in grants for bridge removal or repair. NS also contributed $1.25 million to Manor Township to develop their portion of the right of way. After being abandoned, much of the right of way had been overgrown with heavy brush, and while the rail and ties had been removed, a rough surface of loose track ballast remained.

== Modern day ==
=== Enola Low Grade Trail ===
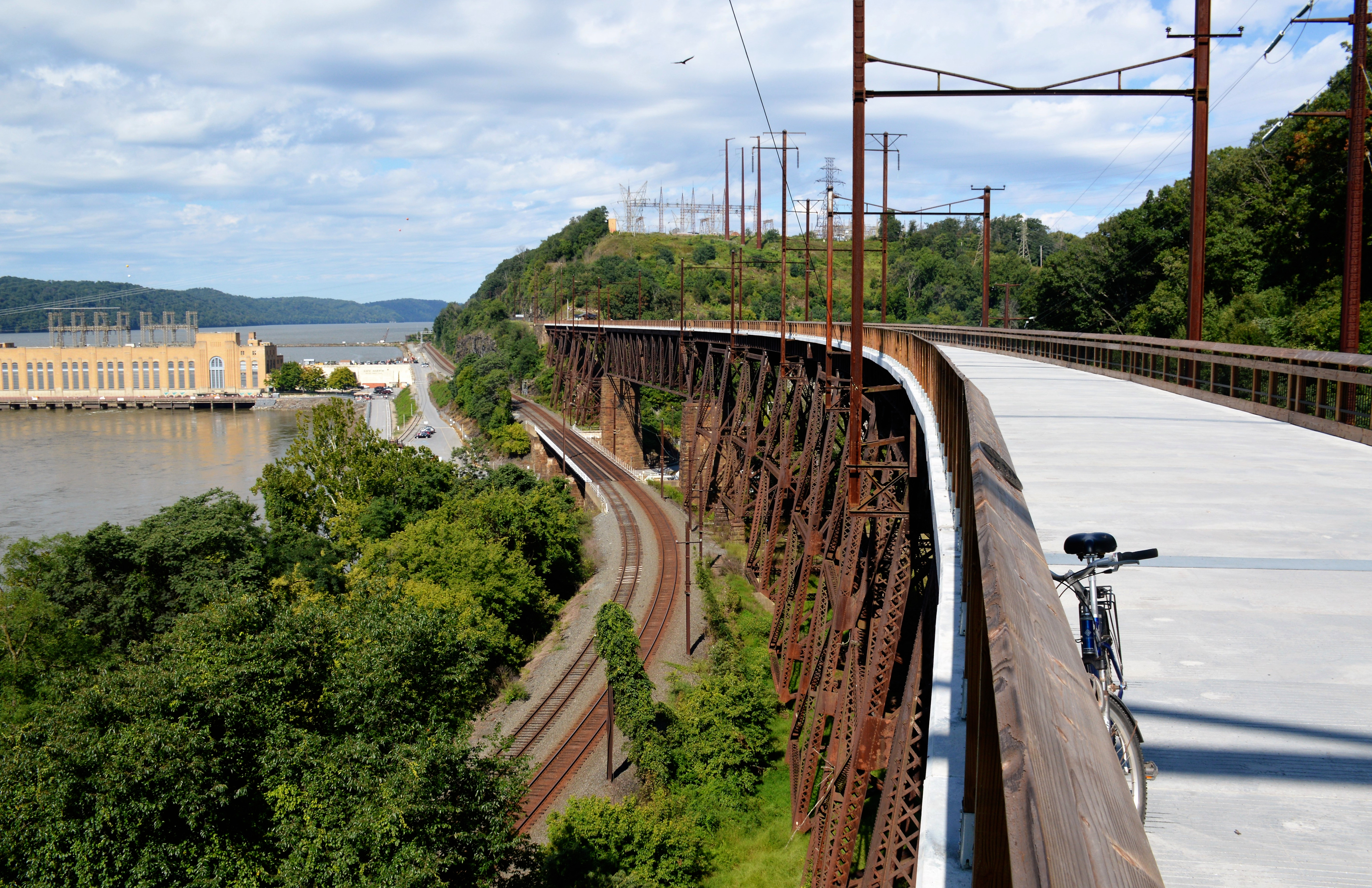
Enola Low Grade Trail over the Safe Harbor Trestle 2022

The portion of the right of way that was transferred to the Lancaster County municipalities is now a 29-mile (47 km) rail trail named the Enola Low Grade Trail. The eight municipalities have opened their sections at varying rates, with the first opening in September 2011. The portion in Manor Township opened in 2013, while Martic and Conestoga townships opened their improved portions in the first half of 2017, and a pedestrian bridge over U.S. 222 north of Quarryville opened in April 2018. The Safe Harbor Trestle opened in June 2022 after a multi-year overhaul, and in October 2022, a trestle in Martic Township reopened (it had first opened for trail users in 2015 but burnt down in 2018), forming a continuous 19 mi (31 km) improved segment between Manor Township and Quarryville.

Of the remaining 10 mi (16 km) of unimproved trail, the portions in Eden and Bart townships are expected to be improved in 2023–24, while funding is being sought to improve the final, easternmost segment through Sadsbury Township to Atglen, including a connection with the Chester Valley Trail.

=== Amtrak power line ===
Amtrak, which received ownership of PRR's electric traction system, operates a power transmission line along the right of way under easement. Its two 138 kV lines supply electricity from Safe Harbor Dam to Amtrak's Parkesburg traction substation. In 2011, Amtrak moved the line's cables from the old Pennsylvania Railroad catenary supports to new monopoles, upgrading the surface to crushed stone at the same time.
