= Brooklyn Eastern District Terminal =

Shortline railroad terminal (1906–83)

Overview
- Headquarters: Brooklyn, New York
- Reporting mark: BEDT
- Locale: New York City & New Jersey
- Dates of operation: 1906 (marine); 1915 (combined railroad, marine operations & freight terminal)–1983

Technical
- Track gauge: 4 ft 8 1/2 in (1,435 mm) standard gauge

The Brooklyn Eastern District Terminal (reporting mark BEDT) was a shortline railroad and marine terminal with its main facilities and administrative offices located on 86–88 Kent Avenue (now part of East River State Park and Bushwick Inlet Park) in the Williamsburg section of Brooklyn, New York City.

== Background ==
The BEDT was first organized in 1906 as a marine and navigation company independent of the railroad operations of the East River Terminal Railroad, incorporated in 1907, but its parentage precedes that date to the company Palmer's Docks. Palmer's Docks was the original combined rail-marine operation, and from all research to date, it was the first rail-marine terminal to operate in Brooklyn.

The BEDT was not large, with a cumulative total of 11 miles (18 km) of track at its peak. However, BEDT had many locomotives and was 100% steam-powered until 1963. It would be the largest of the four independent rail-marine terminals in Brooklyn, the others being Bush Terminal Company, Jay Street Terminal (Jay Street Connecting Railroad), and New York Dock Railway.

Throughout its history, the BEDT had at least six car float bridges along the Brooklyn waterfront located at North 3rd Street, North 5th Street, North 6th Street, North 9th Street, Wallabout Market (1935-1941), and Brooklyn Navy Yard (after 1941). The company maintained one float bridge in Queens at Pidgeon Street and one in New Jersey at Warren Street (1910 – ca. 1929). There was one pier station at Queensboro Terminal in Queens at 14th Street in Long Island City, near the Long Island Rail Road's Long Island City station. Wallabout Market opened around 1933 and was eventually merged with Navy Yard operations in 1941. Queensboro Terminal had a long run, opening in 1914 and closing around 1930.

For most of its history, the BEDT operated around the clock Monday through Saturday with occasional Sunday operations. In its later years, days of operations were reduced to Monday through Friday with occasional Saturday operations.

The BEDT is famous for being the last operator of steam locomotives for freight service in New York, with steam locomotive operations ceasing on October 25, 1963. Operations continued until 1983 with diesel locomotives.

== Rail-marine terminal ==
A rail-marine terminal is also known as a carfloating operation, whereby railroad freight cars are loaded upon a barge by locomotive via a floatbridge, and transported across the water by tugboat to another such location where they are unloaded by another locomotive and float bridge. There, the cars are placed spotted at their desired locations.

The Rail-Marine Terminals located in Brooklyn, NY; (BEDT, Bush Terminal, New York Dock and Jay Street Terminal) were also known as "Contract Terminals". They are so named because they would be contracted by the Class 1 railroads (i.e.: PRR, LV, DL&W, etc..) to transport freight to and from destinations not serviced by the consigned carrier.

== Owners ==
The BEDT was organized by the principals of Havemeyers & Elder, primarily Henry O. Havemeyer, (1847–1907). The BEDT was the successor to Palmer's Docks, which was a combined marine/rail operation, which was organized by Lowell Mason Palmer, (1845–1915). Palmer would partner with the Havemeyers in 1875 to expand the scope of operations of Palmer's Docks through 1905. In 1906, when Lowell Palmer took leave of the operation, the Havemeyer's re-incorporated the organization into the Brooklyn Eastern District Terminal as a navigation corporation. The railroad operation was incorporated separately as the East River Terminal Railroad in 1907. In 1915 however, the railroad and the navigation corporation Brooklyn Eastern District Terminal were merged and reincorporated into the Brooklyn Eastern District Terminal as a freight terminal corporation.

The Havemeyers were widely recognized for their large and successful business interests in the sugar refining industry as "Havemeyer & Elder Sugar Refining" and then "American Sugar Refining" which were located in the New York metropolitan area. See Domino Foods, Inc.

The BEDT, however, was organized as a completely separate business entity from the sugar interests. Reasons for this are not definitive, but it is hypothesized that this railroad/marine operation was kept organizationally independent of the sugar interests due to several legal problems that the sugar operation was embroiled in.

The Havemeyer family would be directly involved in the administration of the BEDT right through 1972, at which time the BEDT would be purchased by Petro Oil, (1972–1976), R.J. Reynolds (1976–1978) and finally New York Dock Properties (1978 through 1983).

== Operations ==
=== 1870–1876 ===
In the beginning, Palmer's Dock, organized by Lowell Palmer; was primarily responsible for the transportation of incoming raw sugar and outgoing refined sugar products, with its fledgling freight business growing throughout the years. Lowell Palmer became partners with the Havemeyers in this venture, after becoming financially partnered with Havemeyer & Elder, and in that Palmer was also the main supplier of casks and barrels for the transportation of Havemeyer & Elder's refined sugar products.

Palmer had been located on the Williamsburg waterfront since the 1860s as Palmer's Cooperage. In 1870, Palmer organized Palmer's Dock, a freight terminal. In 1873, he started a navigation company with a single tugboat and car float that would transport railroad freight cars to the Williamsburg waterfront where those freight cars would be unloaded directly at the bulkhead, but no floatbridge existed at this time to unload the freight cars.

Palmer's descendants, including his son Lowell, would have controlling interests in the Brooklyn Cooperage Company, also located along the Williamsburg Waterfront.

=== 1876–1905 ===
At this time, Lowell Palmer had constructed a carfloat at the foot of North 5th Street with team tracks splitting up from the floatbridge, and trackage extended east up North 5th Street. The construction of the floatbridge enabled Palmer to place or "spot" railroad freight cars directly next to the structures of his customers on the various streets.

Palmer also constructed a consolidated coal facility on Kent Avenue and North 9th Street. This coal facility was state of the art at that time, and greatly reduced the amount of physical labor required for the coal wholesale suppliers in the area. Prior to the construction of this facility, these coal suppliers had to employ large amounts of labor to manually unload the coal barges at the waterfront, where men in the coal barge would shovel the coal into buckets and hoist it up to the dock. The coal would be dumped into wheelbarrows, and wheeled two blocks east to the coal bins. Where it was dumped into street level bins. To load into a coal retailers wagon or truck, it would have to be shoveled again.

With the construction of the coal facility, railroad hopper cars loaded with coal could be brought directly by way of carfloat, where a locomotive hauled the hopper car(s) off the carfloat and brought it up an incline, and placed it in the elevated coal facility. The hopper car had chutes on its underside and these chutes were placed over the coal bins by locomotive, and when opened, the coal would discharge into the storage bins (silo) below. These storage bins themselves were elevated above street level, and at such time when the retailers wagon or truck, located under the silo chute; the coal could be dispensed directly into the coal retailers vehicle.

Palmer would also construct large buildings along these streets and lease the space to Class 1 railroads as freight depots. A freight customer could ship or take delivery of their items with the West Shore, Erie or Central Railroad of New Jersey among others at these freight depots. Customers would now have a choice of carrier to transport their goods.

The Pennsylvania Railroad also had a freight depot: the "North 4th Street Terminal" located adjacent to the Palmers Dock operation, but this property was not affiliated with or leased space from Palmer as the other railroads were.

Also along the water front and served by Palmer's Docks, were a sulfur works, a grain and feed elevator, a rubber factory and a lumber yard, among many smaller storage buildings.

Throughout the years, railroad tracks would expand north and east from the original installation at North 5th Street, eventually reaching North 10th Street, where Palmer also constructed a large warehouse, which was used as hay depot for the various stables in the area.

=== 1905–1915 ===
Lowell Palmer left the Palmer's Dock organization in 1905 after testifying at a hearing on the railroad 'rebate' scandals, and the Havemeyer's reincorporated the railroad operation in 1907 as the "East River Terminal Railroad". The marine aspect of the operation would be reincorporated as the "Brooklyn Eastern District Terminal" in 1906.

Also in 1906, the Pidgeon Street Yard would open to freight traffic, having been planned several years prior by Lowell Palmer.

At this juncture, only the tugboat and carfloat operations carried the BEDT name, while the railroad aspect of operations was known and incorporated as the East River Terminal Railroad in 1907.

In 1909, the Havemeyers announced their construction of a huge building with railroad access, between Kent Avenue and the bulkhead and between North 3 and North 4th Streets. Ironically, the mighty Pennsylvania RR tried to block this construction in court, as it would 'box them in' with no room to expand.

The courts ruled in favor of the East River Terminal RR and when completed in 1915, the building and the connecting railroad trackage would become home to Austin Nichols, a most prominent grocer and sundry wholesaler of the time.

In 1910, the Havemeyers also opened a railroad terminal in Jersey City, known as the Warren Street Terminal. This terminal would have a floatbridge in the Morris Basin Canal, and the terminal would service an American sugar refining plant (owned by Havemeyer & Elder) located there.

In 1914, the ERTRR/BEDT would also open another terminal in northern Long Island City, known as the Queensboro Terminal. This was located on the East River waterfront at 14th Street, west of Vernon Boulevard. A newspaper article announced that the railyard was planned for this location but reference to property maps of the area in various archives do not show these tracks, and yet some Interstate Commerce Commission documents state there were tracks and a floatbridge at this facility. At the least, the BEDT had built a pier or "wharf" station at this location.

=== 1915–1939 ===
In 1915, the Havemeyer's would consolidate both East River Terminal RR and Brooklyn Eastern District Terminal (navigation) corporations under the Brooklyn Eastern District Terminal name, and incorporate such as a consolidated freight terminal.

In 1935, the BEDT entered into agreement with the City of New York to construct a float bridge and team tracks at the Wallabout Market in Brooklyn, inside the Brooklyn Navy Yard and south of the Delaware, and Lackawanna & Western's Wallabout Terminal. Pursuant to this agreement, the BEDT had to agree to trackage connecting this terminal to the Navy Yard tracks, despite the fact that a separate float bridge was already in place for the Navy Yard. This float bridge and team tracks would allow vendors to receive carload lots of produce for resale in the Wallabout Market.

The BEDT was an independent carrier, with no affiliation with any Class 1 railroads such as the Pennsylvania Railroad and Erie Railroad. However, it was contracted by those Class 1 railroads to transport their freight cars across New York Harbor to desired customers in Brooklyn that were receiving service from the BEDT.

=== 1939–1963 ===
The BEDT continued to prosper from the 1930s through the late 1950s. As a result of the condemnation of the Wallabout Market and the BEDT Wallabout Market float bridge and trackage for the expansion of the Navy Yard in 1941, the BEDT received a government contract to operate the Brooklyn Navy Yard trackage. It would transport supplies to the Brooklyn Navy Yard from the mainland U.S. This was to include steel for shipbuilding, coal for the forges and power plant, forged naval rifles for the warships, among many smaller items. As World War II escalated, so would rail traffic to this location. The BEDT was also responsible for the transportation of vast amounts of meat to be cut and packaged by the Cudahy, Morrell and Armour meat packers located in Brooklyn.

=== 1963–1976 ===
The BEDT ceased steam locomotive operations and began diesel-electric locomotive operations with the last steam locomotive running on October 25, 1963.

In 1964, the BEDT built the "Bulk Four Terminal" on Kent Avenue between North 8th and North 9th Streets. This facility consolidated the receipt and subsequent distribution of flour and semolina for the many commercial bakers and pasta manufacturers in Brooklyn. The BEDT also acquired the former Pennsylvania RR North 4th Street Terminal properties and leased that property to a scrap iron salvor, and BEDT would handle the transportation of the gondolas for that customer.

In 1976, following the bankruptcy filings of the Northeast Class 1 railroads (Penn Central, NYNH & H, Erie Lackawanna, etc.); Conrail was formed by the U.S. government. With this formation, Conrail decided it would have no interest in maintaining or continuing the marine operations of the former Class 1 railroads, but it was recognized that carfloating operations were still desired for rail traffic destined for Brooklyn. As a result, it put up for bid a contract to continue those carfloating operations.

=== 1976–present ===
In July 1975, the United States Railway Association released its "Final System Plan" which in accordance with the Regional Rail Act of 1973, made recommendations for the reorganization of the railroads in the Northeast United States. Subsequently, the Interstate Commerce Commission recommended that New York Dock and Brooklyn Eastern District Terminal operations be merged to avoid duplication of effort.

By 1976, the BEDT and the New York Dock Railway (NYD) were the only car-float operators remaining in New York City. In 1976, Conrail solicited bids for the carfloating contract for Brooklyn bound rail traffic, with BEDT being the winning bidder. Conrail entered into a lease agreement with the BEDT for use of the former PRR Greenville Yard and adjoining floatbridge facilities, and BEDT continued the carfloating for all Brooklyn bound rail traffic. Circa 1977, New York Dock Properties (the parent company of the New York Dock Railway) purchased the Brooklyn Eastern District Terminal. As a result, the BEDT and NYD merged as recommended by the "Final System Plan" of the FRA but both companies would retain their independent logos and equipment. Some older, less efficient equipment were mothballed or scavenged for parts. BEDT closed its Pidgeon Street facility sometime circa 1977–1978, and combined operations of NYD and BEDT would cease in August 1983 and would be acquired by New York Cross Harbor.

After 1983, the BEDT property on Kent Avenue was left vacant and quickly became a blighted, abandoned property. Graffiti artists and squatters reused the property. One of BEDT's steam locomotives (number 16) remained here until being rescued by the Railroad Museum of Long Island in 1996. Today, the property has become the East River State Park. A short segment of track is still visible in the park, in a concrete pad where the flour terminal building once stood.

== Commodities ==
Throughout its history, the primary commodities hauled by the BEDT were:

Incoming: Meats, raw sugar, hops, coal, rolls of paper for newspaper printing, empty cans and bottles for both soft drinks and breweries, corn syrup for soft drinks, raw materials for the manufacture of consumer goods, groceries and sundries, finished steel products, steel, military supplies and armaments (for Brooklyn Navy Yard).

Outgoing: Scrap metal, refined sugar products, manufactured goods, bottled beer and soft drinks.

== Motive power ==
=== Steam locomotives ===
The BEDT (and Palmer's Dock & East River Terminal Railroad) operated steam powered locomotives from 1870 until October 25, 1963, at such time when diesel electric locomotives replaced the steam powered equipment. The steam locomotives consisted of both Baldwin locomotives ("Frederick Havemeyer" [#1] through number 11) and H. K. Porter locomotives (numbers 12 through 16).

Locomotives 6 through 9 were inherited by BEDT from both Palmer's Dock and East River Terminal operations, and were scrapped by the late 1930s. Numbers 10 and 11 were purchased new from Baldwin by the BEDT, and were scrapped in 1963 and 1962 respectively.

The "Frederick Havemeyer" and numbers 2 through 6, were of 0-4-0T wheel arrangement. Numbers 7 through 16 were of 0-6-0T wheel arrangement.

H. K. Porter locomotives were purchased second hand from various sources. These engines were originally coal fired, but were converted during the 1930's to burn oil, to afford one person operation. All the H. K. Porter locomotives survive to this day, after being purchased by various private individuals and preservation groups.

Currently, the only BEDT steam engine under operation is #15, which was rebuilt into a replica of Thomas the Tank Engine by the Strasburg Rail Road between 1998 and 1999.

The following BEDT locomotives have been preserved:

- #12 Florida Gulf Coast Railroad Museum; Parrish, FL
- #13 Age of Steam Roundhouse; Sugarcreek, OH
- #14 Ulster & Delaware Railroad Historical Society; Arkville, NY
- #15 Strasburg RR; Strasburg, PA (Travels to other locations on occasion.)
- #16 Railroad Museum of Long Island; Riverhead, NY

Steam Locomotives
Number/Name	Wheel Arrangement	Builder	Serial number	Built	Retired	Notes
1 "Frederick C. Havemeyer"	0-4-0T	Baldwin Locomotive Works	3801	12/1875	prior to 1933	Baldwin class 4-28-C. Originally built to 6 foot gauge for Havenmeyer & Elder, later regauged for Palmer's Dock by BLW. Built as a steam dummy.
2 "Florence"	0-4-0T	Baldwin Locomotive Works	7596	5/1885	prior to 1933	Baldwin class 4-28-C. Originally built for Lowell M. Palmer & Co. #2. Later to BEDT. Built as a steam dummy.
3 "Grace"	0-4-0T	Baldwin Locomotive Works	8746	9/1887	prior to 1933	Baldwin class 4-28-C. Originally built for Lowell M. Palmer & Co. #3. Later to BEDT. Built as a steam dummy.
4 "Lily"	0-4-0T	Baldwin Locomotive Works	11439	12/1890	prior to 1933	Baldwin class 4-28-C. Originally built for Lowell M. Palmer & Co. #4. Later to BEDT. Built as a steam dummy.
5 "Arthur"	0-4-0T	Baldwin Locomotive Works	11982	6/1892	prior to 1933	Baldwin class 4-28-C. Originally built for Lowell M. Palmer & Co. #5. Later to BEDT. Built as a steam dummy.
6 "Ethel"	0-4-0T	Baldwin Locomotive Works	14743	3/1896	between 1933 and 1936	Baldwin class 4-28-C. Originally built for Lowell M. Palmer & Co. #6. Later to BEDT. Built as a steam dummy. Rebuilt in 1918 as a low style 3/4 saddle tank.
7 "Chester"	0-6-0T	Baldwin Locomotive Works	17890	2/21/1900	unknown	Baldwin class 6-32-D. Originally built for Lowell M. Palmer & Co. #7. Later to BEDT. Built as a steam dummy. Later rebuilt as square sided saddletank.
8 "Carleton"	0-6-0T	Baldwin Locomotive Works	18145	9/1900	between 1933 and 1936	Baldwin class 6-32-D. Originally built for Lowell M. Palmer & Co. #8. Later to BEDT. Built as a steam dummy. Unknown if rebuilt; if so, most likely had the same "low style" 3/4 saddle tank as #6.
9	0-6-0T	Baldwin Locomotive Works	29543	11/1906	between 1934 and 1936	Baldwin class 6-32-D. Originally built as Havemeyer & Elder & Co. #9. Later to BEDT. Built as a steam dummy.
10	0-6-0T	Baldwin Locomotive Works	39696	4/1913	between April and July 1963	Baldwin class 6-32-D. Bought new. Originally built as a round saddle tank locomotive with closed cab. Later converted to a square sided saddle tank. Scrapped April - July 1963.
11	0-6-0T	Baldwin Locomotive Works	55276	2/1922	July 1962	Baldwin class 6-32-D. Bought new. Originally built as a round saddle tank locomotive with open cab. Later converted to square sided saddletank. Scrapped 1962.
12	0-6-0T	H.K. Porter & Company	6368	3/1919	June 1963	H.K. Porter class 12-24-C-SS-I. Ex-United States Navy Fleet Supply Base - South Brooklyn Section #3. Sold to the BEDT in 1922. To Ron Ziel in June 1963. Later sold to Robert Most in March 1971. Now at the Florida Railroad Museum in Parrish, Florida.
13	0-6-0T	H.K. Porter & Company	6369	3/1919	10/1963	H.K. Porter class 18-24-C-SS-I. Ex-United States Navy Fleet Supply Base - South Brooklyn Section #4. Sold to the BEDT in 1922. To Rail Tours Inc. in October 1963. To the Railroad Museum of Pennsylvania in January 1977. Now at the Age of Steam Roundhouse.
14	0-6-0ST	H.K. Porter & Company	6260	9/1920	12/25/1963	H.K. Porter class 18-24-C-S-I. Ex-Mesta Machine Works #5. To Birmingham Rail & Locomotive Company in 1932 who later sold to the BEDT on February 18, 1935. It suffered a boiler explosion in 1953. Retired December 25, 1963. Sold to the Maryland and Pennsylvania Railroad in 1964 for Railtours. Sold to the Black River and Western Railroad in 1965. Sold to the Ulster and Delaware Railroad Historical Society in 1993.
15	0-6-0ST	H.K. Porter & Company	5966	3/1917	12/25/1963	H.K. Porter class 18-24-C-S-I. Ex-Mesta Machine Works. Later sold to the BEDT. Last steam locomotive to run on the BEDT. To South Appalachian Railway in 1965. To Toledo, Lake Erie and Western Railway in 1975. To Strasburg Railroad in 1998 and rebuilt as a replica of Thomas the Tank Engine.
16	0-6-0T	H.K. Porter & Company	6780	1/1923	12/25/1963	H.K. Porter class 12-24-C-S-I. Ex-Astoria Light, Heat and Power Company #5. Later to Fleischmanns Transportation. To Birmingham Rail & Locomotive Company in 1939 who sold it to the BEDT on January 13 of that year. Sold to George Foster in 1963. Now at the Railroad Museum of Long Island. According to the sources, #16 was modified with a square "skirt" between June 1959 and October 1960.

=== Steam tugboats ===
The first steam powered tugboats were coal fired as well, and the first two were of wood hull construction. Hull construction for the vessels built after the turn of the century, were of steel construction.

As with the steam locomotives, coal fired tugboats fell out of favor when heavy oils became dominant as an industrial fuel. The reason BEDT operated their steam locomotives later than any other railroads, is that their tugs were fired by Bunker C fuel as well. It naturally made for simpler logistics to operate all equipment with one type of fuel.

It was only after the parts for the steam locomotives and steam tugs became unavailable or too costly to machine, that diesel electric tugs and likewise diesel electric locomotives replace their steam powered counterparts.

None of the BEDT steam powered tugs are known to survive.

=== Diesel locomotives ===
The diesel electric locomotives employed by the BEDT were all American Locomotive Company (ALCO) S-1 models with B-B wheel arrangement (two powered axles on a two axle truck for a total of 4 powered axles per locomotive)

These were purchased used from various other railroads over the course of the 1960s and these locomotives were numbered 21 through 26.

All but one of the diesel locomotives were scrapped, and the surviving locomotive is #25. It has been restored and painted as a New York Central locomotive (even though it was originally built for and operated by the Erie Railroad) and is currently displayed in Riverside Park in Manhattan.

=== Diesel tugboats ===
The diesel electric tugboats employed by the BEDT varied subtly in specifications and builder. Only one of the BEDT diesel tugs is known to have survived and it is currently used as a non-powered "breakwater" in a Rhode Island yacht club. As of late 2007, this tugboat suffered from vandalism which caused it to sink, and its scrapping is being considered.

== Facilities ==
Other than its main facility located along Kent Avenue between North 3rd and North 9th Streets (and eventually expanding to North 12th Street in the 1960s), the BEDT had other facilities located at:

- Pidgeon Street, Long Island City, Queens, NY; 1906 to 1977/1978;
- Warren Street, Jersey City, NJ; 1910 to approximately 1928.
- Queensboro Terminal, Long Island City, Queens, NY; 1914–1928?;
- Wallabout Terminal, Brooklyn, NY; 1935-1941 – absorbed into BNY operations;
- Greenville Yard, Jersey City, NJ; 1976–1978; BEDT leased this yard and carfloating rights from Conrail after 1976, and a Conrail locomotive would be leased to perform switching duties at Greenville. Carfloating service was provided to New York Dock and BEDT's own bridge traffic. This yard was used by BEDT from 1978 until the merger with New York Dock, in which the combines BEDT/New York Dock continued operations.
