= Day Out with Thomas =

Railway events licensed by Mattel

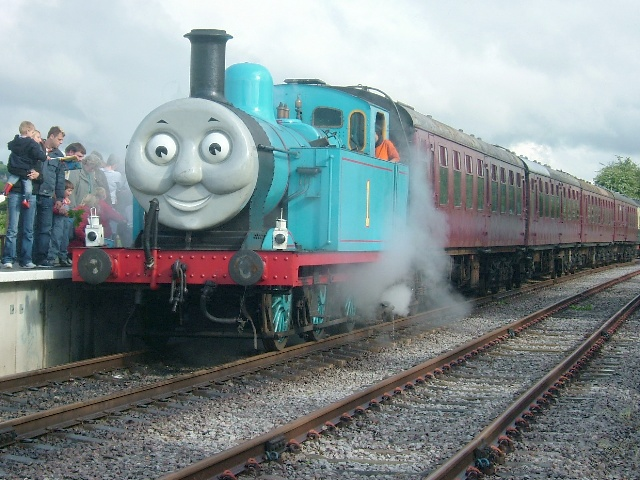
- Replica of Thomas the Tank Engine on the Avon Valley Railway
- Genre: Toys and entertainment
- Frequency: Annually
- Location: Worldwide
- Founded: 1987
- Organizer: Mattel
- Website: https://www.dayoutwiththomas.co.uk/

Day Out with Thomas is a trade name, licensed by Mattel for tourist events that take place on heritage railways and feature one or more engines decorated to look like characters from the British children's television series Thomas & Friends. The events are held in Australia, Canada, Japan, the Netherlands, New Zealand, the United Kingdom, and the United States of America. They include a full-day of activities for families in addition to rides on trains pulled by the customised steam locomotives resembling characters such as Thomas the Tank Engine.

== Family activities ==
Day Out with Thomas family events include train rides and activities like live entertainment, scavenger hunts, bounce houses, mazes, lawn games, and stage shows. For example, an event in Ohio had a straw bale maze, bouncy houses, portable mini golf, model train displays, balloon artists, and Thomas Wooden Railway train tables.

Events often include characters like Sir Topham Hatt and Rusty and Dusty. The events usually last all day.

== Full-scale Thomas locomotives ==
The Nene Valley Railway at Peterborough in England was the first railway to possess a full-scale replica of Thomas, constructed from an industrial tank engine built by Hudswell Clarke in 1947. It was nicknamed "Thomas" and in 1971 was officially named by the Reverend W. Awdry.

Ever since then other tank engines around the world have appeared as Thomas. The Strasburg Rail Road and Mid Hants Railway have built working replicas from original locomotives.

== Country events ==
=== Australia ===
In Australia, several railways have hosted Day Out with Thomas events: in New South Wales the Zig Zag Railway, Lithgow, and the NSW Rail Transport Museum, Thirlmere; in Queensland, the Workshop Railway Museum; and in Victoria the Puffing Billy Railway and the Bellarine Railway.

=== Netherlands ===
In the Netherlands annually, these events are held at Het Spoorwegmuseum in Utrecht.

=== New Zealand ===
In New Zealand, Mainline Steam's Bagnall tank locomotive has appeared as Thomas on a number of different locations (including at the Britomart Transport Centre in Auckland and has also appeared at the extremely popular biannual "Day out with Thomas the Tank Engine" weekends at the Glenbrook Vintage Railway (south of Auckland)).

=== United Kingdom ===
Many heritage railways up and down the UK have hosted Day Out with Thomas events over the years; some events feature just Thomas himself (whilst others (such as the Watercress Line, East Lancashire Railway, East Anglian Railway Museum, Whistlestop Valley, Bo'ness and Kinneil Railway and the Caledonian Railway (Brechin) also feature some of Thomas' friends such as Percy, James, Toby, Diesel, Mavis and Duck)). As of 2022, 9 Heritage Railways in the UK host Day Out with Thomas events. Some railways also host ‘Festive’ Day Out with Thomas which features Father Christmas and additional activities. As a result of the licensing costs and other demands imposed by Mattel/HiT, some railways have replaced their Thomas events with similar ones which also feature engines with faces.

==== U.K. railways that have Day Out with Thomas events ====
- East Lancashire Railway
- Mid-Hants Railway
- Bo'ness and Kinneil Railway
- Didcot Railway Centre

=== United States and Canada ===
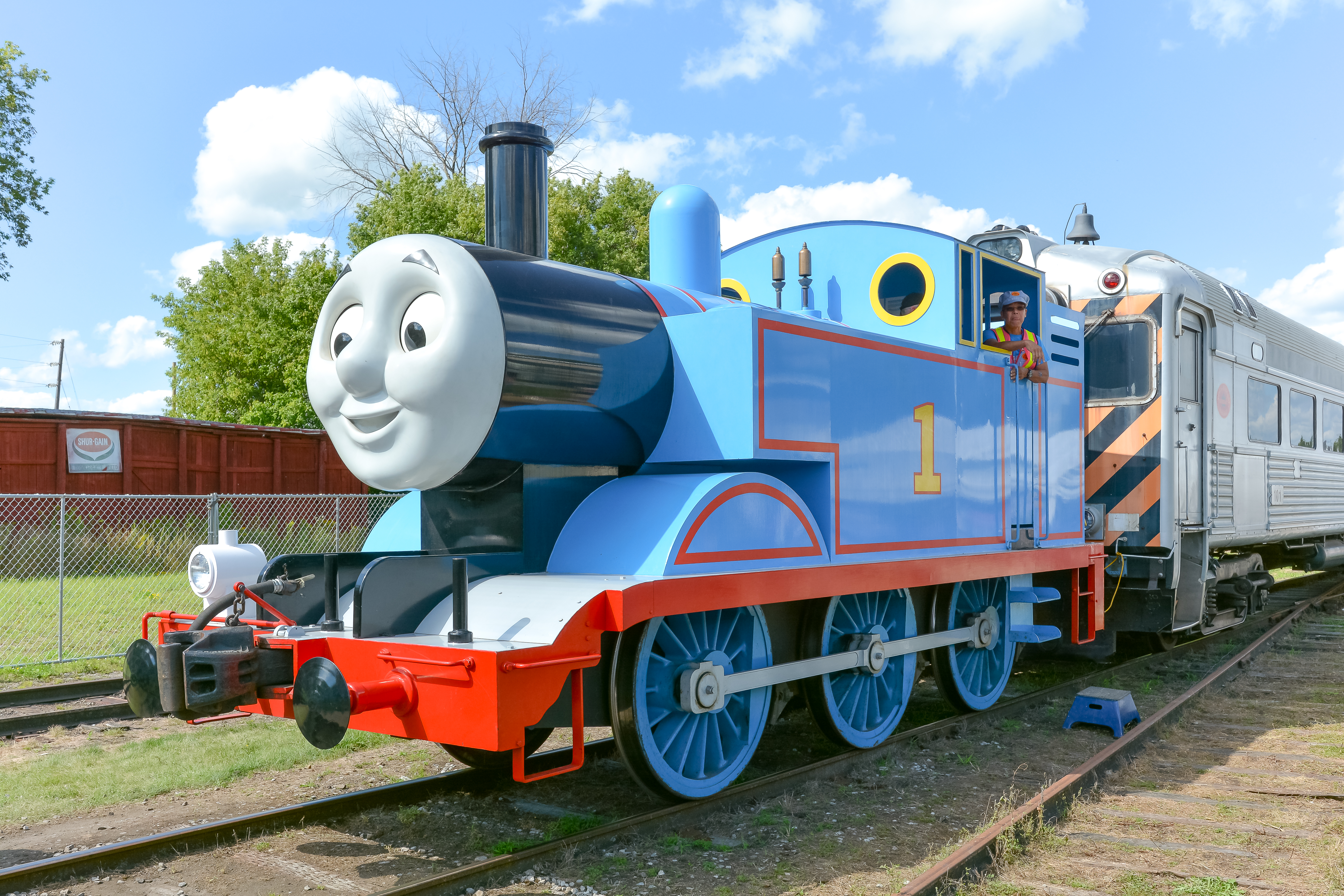
An unpowered Thomas the Tank Engine dummy unit on the York-Durham Heritage Railway in Uxbridge, Ontario

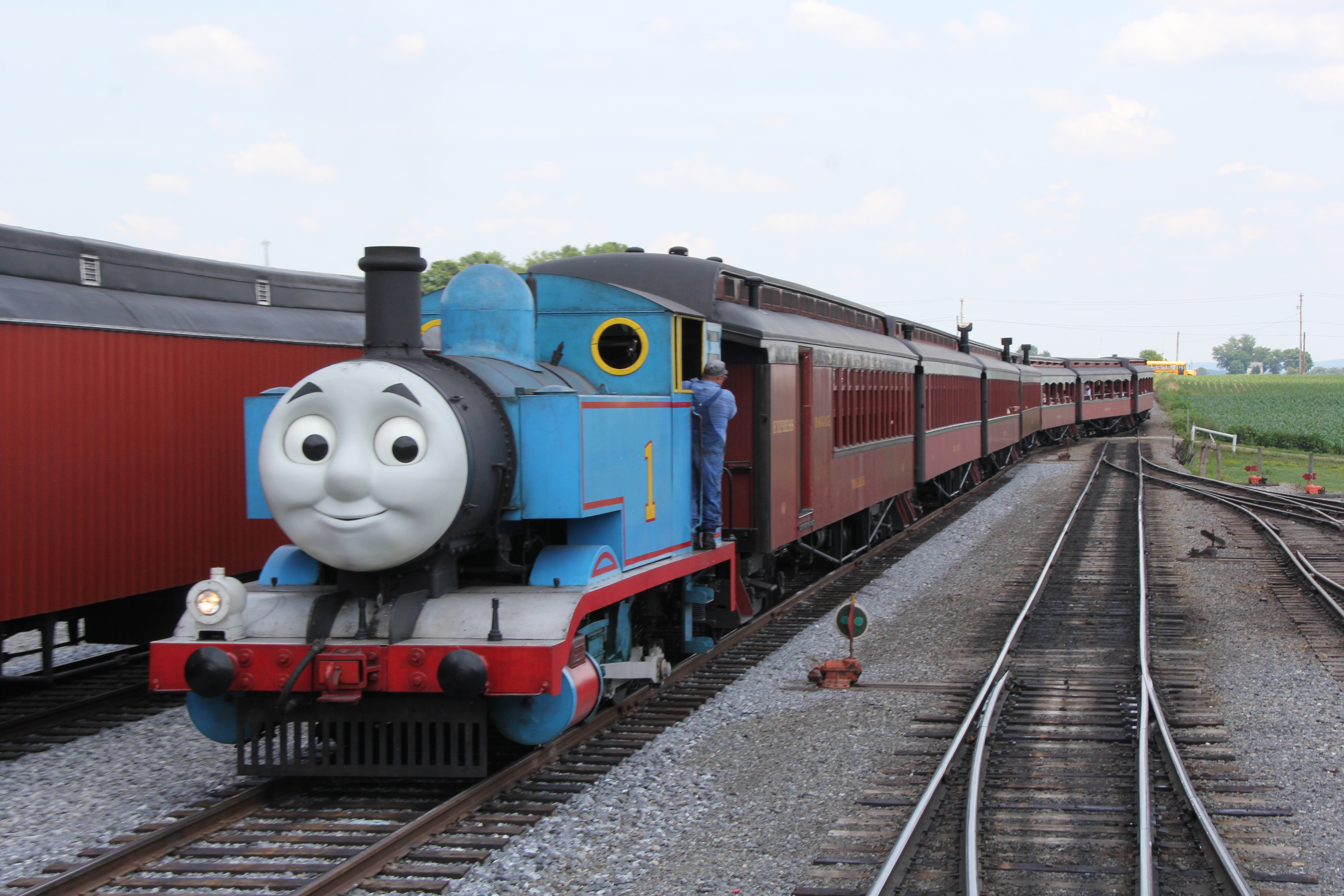
Former Brooklyn Eastern District Terminal 15, now decorated as Thomas, on the Strasburg Railroad

Events have been held in Colorado, Minnesota, Pennsylvania, Georgia, Michigan, Maryland, New Hampshire, Washington, California, Ohio, Oregon, North Carolina, and Missouri. In Canada, Thomas has visited locations including Toronto, Calgary and Squamish.

==== Locomotives ====
The United States has six Thomas replicas: one is a steam locomotive and the others are dummy units. All were decorated or built by the Strasburg Railroad, with the real steam engine being converted from Brooklyn Eastern District Terminal No. 15. The dummy units are used with a steam or diesel locomotive operating as a pusher. They have a compressed air whistle powered by the train's compressed air system. One unit is 3 ft (914 mm) gauge, the other four are standard gauge. An additional 2 ft (610 mm) gauge replica operated at the Edaville Railroad until 2022, though it returned to Edaville for a limited time in 2024.

While in transit between events, Thomas' face is covered to prevent it from getting damaged or dirtied. The dummy units are transported from location to location via flatbed truck. Thomas appears in full dress at Day Out with Thomas events hosted by railroads in arrangement with Mattel. Many of the larger railroad museums and tourist railroads across the United States host Day out with Thomas events periodically. The same trains are also used for the three Canadian events (in BC, Alberta and Ontario). The National Railroad Museum in Green Bay, Wisconsin was the first railroad museum in the United States to host a "Day Out with Thomas" event (unveiling a small Thomas replica in December 1996).

In September 2014, a full-scale replica of Percy was built which is also a dummy unit. Before Percy's introduction, Thomas' original face was replaced in April 2014 with an animatronic CGI-style face allowing the mouth to open and close and speak pre-recorded dialogue through a voice speaker. Initially, the voice lines for Thomas are provided by Martin Sherman (Thomas' US voice actor from 2009-2015) while the voice lines for Percy were provided by Christopher Ragland (US voice actor for Percy from 2015-2021).

In 2023, Thomas and Percy were given splats of different paint colors on their paintwork to fit with the theme of that year’s tour, "Day Out with Thomas: Let's Get Colorful! Tour".

In 2024, Thomas and Percy were given bubbles on their paintwork to fit with the theme of "Day Out with Thomas: The Bubble Tour".

=== Japan ===
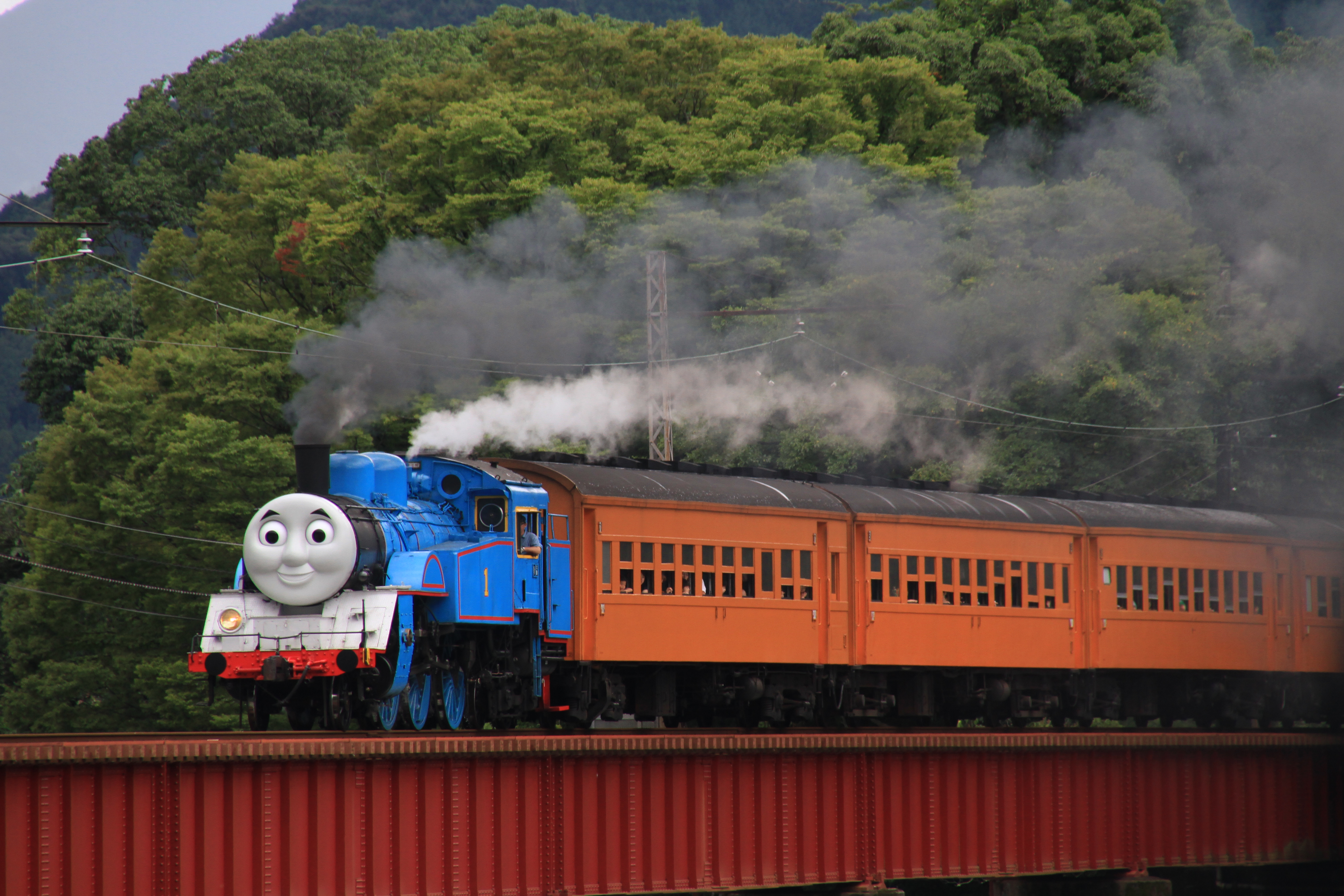
A Thomas the Tank Engine in Japan (2014 version)

Japan's Oigawa Railway started running Thomas events in 2014. Families can travel from Shin-Kanaya Station to Senzu Station. There are activities and treats during the ride and at both terminals.

==== Locomotives and characters ====
The Thomas used at the Oigawa Railway is a modified and repainted version of the railway's existing JNR Class C11 227 locomotive. In addition to Thomas, two other locomotives at the railway were rethemed: The JNR Class 9600 49616 became a Hiro replica and was put on display at the station yard of Senzu Station while the Class DB1 No. DB9 became a Rusty replica.

In 2015, the railway introduced James, who was repainted from their JNR Class C56 No. 44 locomotive. The railway also refurbished and redecorated their disused JNR Class C12 No. 208 engine as a non-functioning replica of Percy, which sits alongside the Class 9600 that is decorated to resemble Hiro.

In 2016, a Hino Poncho bus was redecorated into a replica of Bertie. The Troublesome Trucks were also introduced, and were pulled by Rusty.

In 2018, a replica of Winston the track inspection car was introduced and guests can ride and operate him by peddling. A replica of Flynn the Fire Engine was introduced in 2019, followed by a replica of Bulgy the double-decker bus in 2020 which runs alongside the existing replica of Bertie.

The Thomas locomotive was given a repaint in 2021 under the guise of his green L.B.S.C. livery from the 2015 direct-to-video special Thomas & Friends: The Adventure Begins.

In August 2022, a Toby the Tram Engine replica (modified and repainted from a DD20 class diesel-electric locomotive) was added to the lineup.

== See also ==
Theodore Too
