= Sugar Pine Lumber Company 4 =

Preserved American 2-8-2T stream locomotive

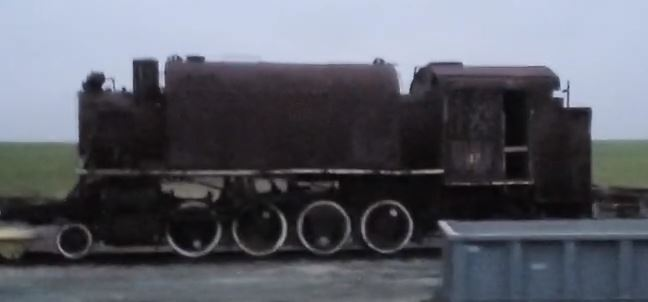
- No. 4 in storage at the Strasburg Rail Road's yard in 2021
Type and origin
- Power type: Steam
- Designer: Sugar Pine Lumber Company
- Builder: American Locomotive Company
- Serial number: 66033
- Build date: 1925
Specifications
- Configuration
  - Whyte: 2-8-2ST
- Gauge: 1,435 mm (4 ft 8 1/2 in)
- Loco weight: 197,500 lb (89,600 kg)
- Fuel type: Oil
- Cylinders: Two, outside
- Valve gear: Walschaerts
- Valve type: Piston valves
- Loco brake: Air
- Train brakes: Air
- Couplers: Knuckle
Career
- Operators: Sugar Pine Lumber Company; Pacific Lumber Company; Wawa and Concordville Railroad; Wilmington and Western Railroad
- Numbers: SPL 4; PALCO 37; W&C 37; WWRC 37
- Delivered: 1925
- Retired: 1990
- Restored: 1966 (1st excursion service); 2024 (cosmetically)
- Current owner: Age of Steam Roundhouse
- Disposition: On static display

Sugar Pine Lumber Company 4 is a 2-8-2ST "Mikado" type steam locomotive, built in 1925 by the American Locomotive Company (ALCO). After the Sugar Pine Lumber Company went bankrupt in 1933, it wound later be purchased by Pacific Lumber Company (SPL) and renumbered to 37. The engine was briefly purchased to railfan Frank Bayliss before starting its heritage railroad career on the Wawa & Concord Ville Railroad (W&C) in 1966.

The engine saw service on the Wilmington and Western Railroad (WWRC) before being retired in 1990. In 2003, the Timber Heritage Association purchased the locomotive and had her stored at the Strasburg Railroad (SRC) starting in 2010 with intentions of operational restoration. In 2023 the Timber Heritage Association sold the engine to the Age of Steam Roundhouse where it received a cosmetic restoration and is now on display.

== Bibliography ==
- Robertson, Donald B. (1986). Encyclopedia of Western Railroad History. p. 180. JSTOR 978-0870043857.
