= Brooklyn Eastern District Terminal 15 =

Preserved 0-6-0ST steam locomotive

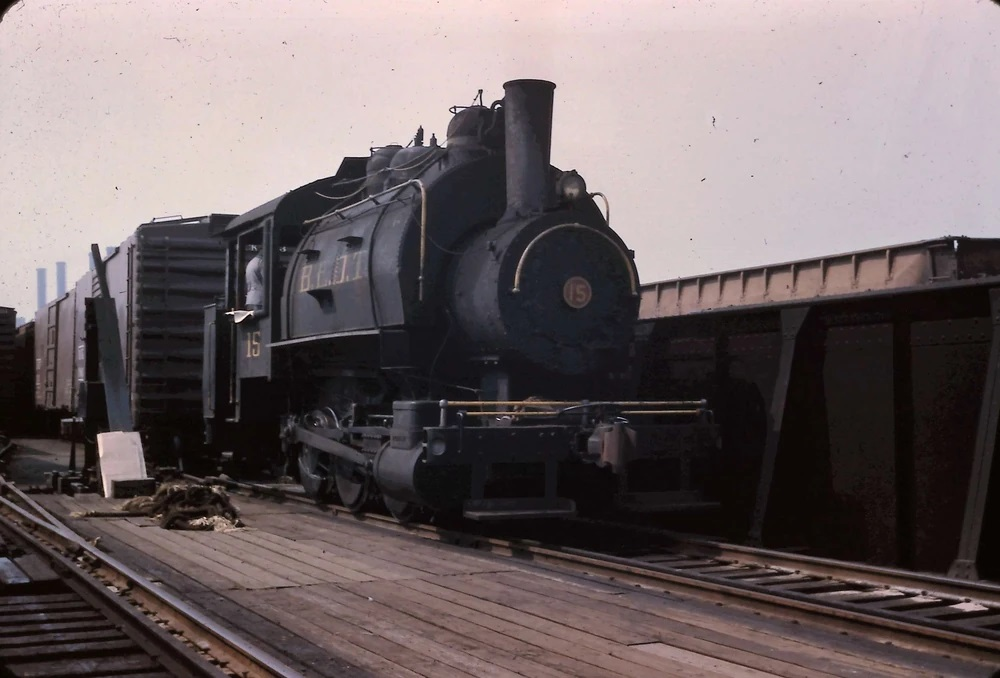
- Brooklyn Eastern District Terminal 0-6-0ST no. 15 on the move to West Medford, Massachusetts in 1963
Type and origin
- Power type: Steam
- Builder: H.K. Porter, Inc.
- Serial number: 5966
- Build date: March 1917
- Rebuilder: Strasburg Rail Road
- Rebuild date: 1999
Specifications
- Configuration
  - Whyte: 0-6-0ST
- Gauge: 4 ft 8 1/2 in (1,435 mm)
- Driver dia.: 46 in (1,168 mm)
- Adhesive weight: 128,000 lb (58.1 tonnes)
- Loco weight: 128,000 lb (58.1 tonnes)
- Fuel type: New: Oil; Now: Coal
- Fuel capacity: Oil: 500 US gallons (1,900 L; 420 imp gal); Coal: 1.5 t (1.5 long tons; 1.7 short tons)
- Water cap.: 1,450 US gal (5,500 L; 1,210 imp gal)
- Boiler pressure: 180 lbf/in^{2} (1.24 MPa)
- Cylinders: Two, outside
- Cylinder size: 18 in × 24 in (457 mm × 610 mm)
- Valve gear: Stephenson
- Valve type: Piston valves
- Loco brake: Air
- Train brakes: Air
- Couplers: Knuckle
Performance figures
- Tractive effort: 25,817 lbf (114.84 kN)
Career
- Operators: Brooklyn Eastern District Terminal; Southern Appalachian Railway; Strasburg Rail Road; Illinois Railway Museum (leased); Great Smoky Mountains Railroad (leased); Belvidere and Delaware River Railway (leased)
- Class: ST
- Numbers: BEDT 15; SRC 15
- Retired: December 25, 1963 (revenue service); 1968 (1st excursion service)
- Restored: 1965 (1st excursion service); April 29, 1999 (2nd excursion service)
- Current owner: Strasburg Rail Road
- Disposition: In storage, awaiting overhaul

Brooklyn Eastern District Terminal 15 is an ST class 0-6-0ST "Switcher" type steam locomotive, owned and operated by the Strasburg Rail Road (SRC) outside of Strasburg, Pennsylvania, where it was significantly altered to resemble the fictional character Thomas the Tank Engine.

== History ==
=== Revenue service ===
The engine was built in March 1917 by the H.K. Porter Inc. for Mesta Machine Works before being sold to the Brooklyn Eastern District Terminal (BEDT) in 1935; it has a wheel arrangement of 0-6-0ST. The engine originally worked as a dockside switcher engine, hauling freight trains for boats and ships.

=== Preservation and changing ownership ===
After years of service, No. 15 was retired and put out of service on December 25, 1963. It was purchased by Edward Bernard for $5,000 for the Southern Appalachian Railway (SAR) in 1965, where it was rebuilt and operated in occasional service.

In 1968, the Yancey Railroad offered steam trips between Micaville and Kona by using the No. 15 and two steel passenger coaches. This operation unfortunately was not a huge success and the locomotive along with the equipment was put into storage in Burnsville, North Carolina for several years before being sold. In 1975, the Toledo, Lake Erie and Western Railway (TLEW) purchased No. 15 and placed it on static display for the next twenty-three years. The engine remained on display until 1998, when the Strasburg Rail Road (SRC) purchased No. 15.

=== Strasburg Rail Road ===
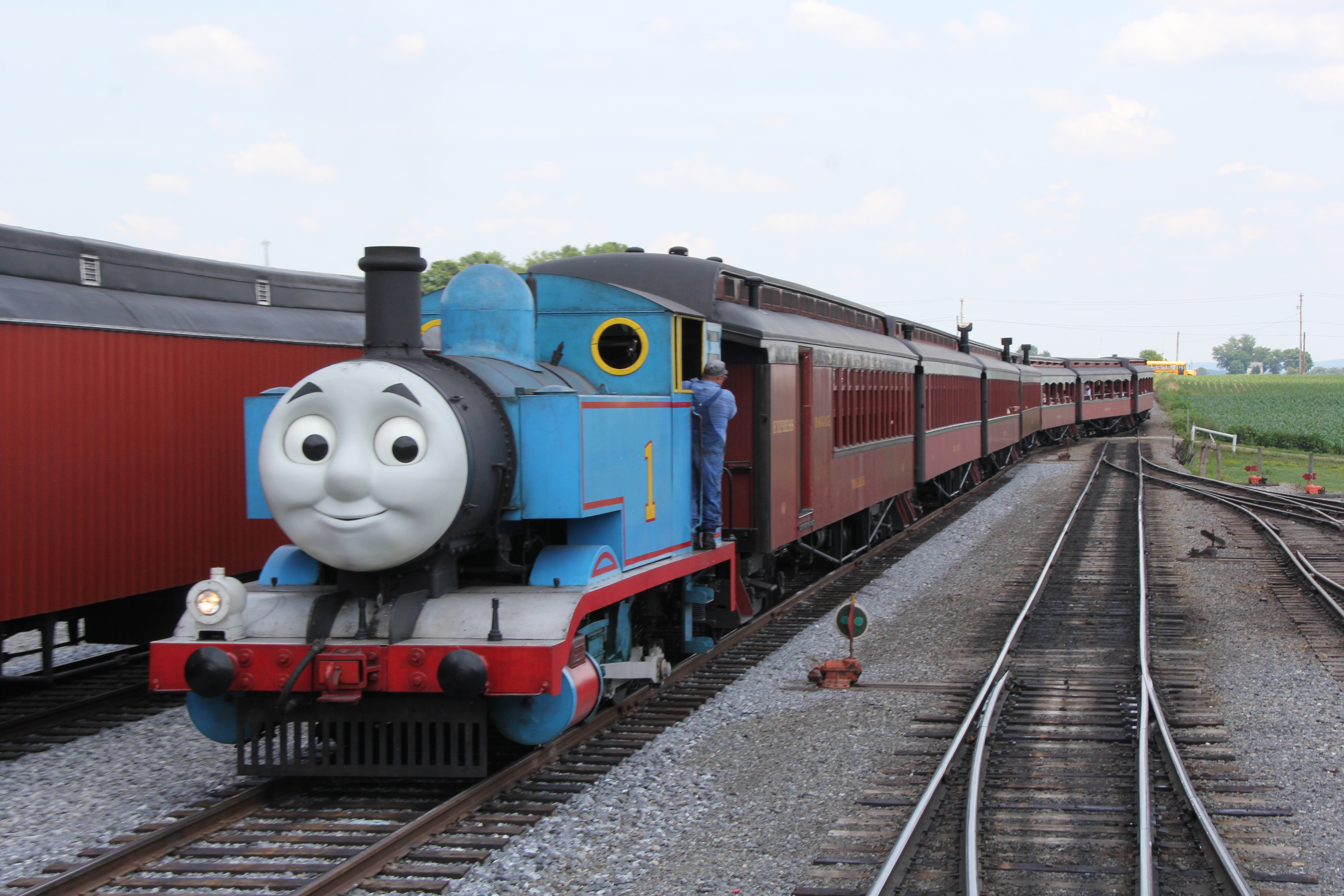
No. 15 pulling a Day out with Thomas train, c. 2016

No. 15 arrived on SRC's property in May 1998. The following year when film producer Britt Allcroft asked permission from Strasburg to film on their railroad for Thomas and the Magic Railroad, they brought an idea to her, about which she was thrilled; they proposed to restore the locomotive and convert it into a full-size operating replica of Thomas the Tank Engine.

Work subsequently began, and in the process, the railroad converted No. 15 from oil to coal firing. No. 15 participated in its first public Day Out with Thomas events, on the weekend of September 25-27, 1998, but the locomotive was not fired up, and a 44-ton switcher moved the train from the opposite end. No. 15 eventually underwent its first test fire with its Thomas livery, on April 14, 1999, and on April 29, it made its first public run for that day’s Day Out with Thomas event.

The full-scale Thomas replica locomotive has been used for the semiannual Thomas activities ever since. It also has been occasionally transferred to other railroads for the same purpose, such as the Illinois Railway Museum, the Greenfield Village Line (formerly), the Great Smoky Mountains Railroad, and the Belvidere and Delaware River Railway. Today, the locomotive operates in June and September of each year. In early 2026, the locomotive was taken out of service for mechanical repairs, causing the cancellation of the Day Out With Thomas events at the Henry Ford Museum.

== Appearances in media ==
In 2023, the locomotive made an appearance in the documentary film An Unlikely Fandom, centering on the adult fandom of Thomas the Tank Engine. The film was produced and directed by Brannon Carty.

== See also ==
- Canadian National 7312
- Reading 1187
- Great Western 90
- Canadian National 89
- Norfolk and Western 475
- Canadian Pacific 972

== Sources ==
- Conner, Eric; Barrall, Steve (2017). Strasburg Rail Road. Images of Rail (1st ed.). Arcadia Publishing. ISBN 978-1-4671-2507-9.
