= Wawa and Concordville Railroad =

Overview
- Status: Out of service
- Owner: SEPTA
- Locale: Concordville, Pennsylvania
- Termini: Wawa, Pennsylvania; Concordville, Pennsylvania

Service
- Type: Tourist railroad
- Services: Local

History
- Opened: 1967
- Closed: 1968

Technical
- Line length: 12.2 mi (19.6 km)
- Number of tracks: 1
- Character: Surface
- Track gauge: 1,435 mm (4 ft 8 1/2 in)

The Wawa and Concordville Railroad was a steam tourist railroad in the U.S. state of Pennsylvania during the late 1960s.

== History ==
The Wawa & Concordville (W&C) was one of the earlier steam tourist railroads. It was conceived by local businessmen with the support of the Delaware County Chamber of Commerce in 1966. It operated from Concordville, near U.S. Route 322, east to the village of Wawa. The railroad operated over a leased portion of the Pennsylvania Railroad's Octoraro Branch.

W&C utilized two steam locomotives for operations: former U.S. Navy 0-6-0T #3 and former Pacific Coast Lumber 2-8-2T #37. Most passenger cars were wooden boxcars that had been converted into open observation passenger cars prior to their use on the W&C.

During the 1968 season, several homeowners along Pole Cat Road near Concordville complained of the noise and smell of steam locomotives coming across their yards. They pressured then-current landlord Penn Central (PC), who opted not renew W&C's lease when it expired in 1968. W&C continued to renegotiate a lease after they were forced to halt operations.

A flash flood in September 1971 and Hurricane Agnes in 1972 severely damaged the line. The bankrupt PC decided to remove the line from service, not having the funds for necessary repairs. At the time, 12 freight cars were marooned on the derelict line.

== Legacy ==
While the station was destroyed by fire, the locomotives and cars remained at the site for another 10 years. Both locomotives eventually were moved to Marshallton, Delaware where they operated on the Wilmington & Western Railroad. Some converted boxcars were scrapped, but two remain near the site in derelict condition. A third is in Marshallton where it is used as a flatcar. U.S. Navy, #3 was later moved to Lewes, Delaware to operate on the Queen Anne's Railroad. It currently serves as part of a railroad themed restaurant in Ocean View, Delaware. #37 was on a siding in Marshallton, but was moved to the Strasburg Railroad and stored there awaiting a restoration until Timber Heritage Association sold it to Age of Steam Roundhouse in Ohio.

The line itself was never formally abandoned and is still owned by SEPTA. Rails and wooden ties remain in place, but are buried beneath soil or are rotting away.

The Wawa & Concordville Historical Society was formed in 2003 to document the railroad's brief history. It was founded by Paul Calpin, A. Marc DeCaro and Jenny Lohse Simpson. Today the group maintains a Facebook fan page. There was also a G scale Model railroad layout in Middletown, Delaware, for some time.

== In print ==
The definitive piece of the W&C was written by Kurt R. Bell and published in the Philadelphia Chapter of the Pennsylvania Railroad Technical & Historical Society's High Line magazine.

== See also ==
- List of heritage railroads in the United States
