= Bushwick Inlet Park =

Public park in Brooklyn, New York

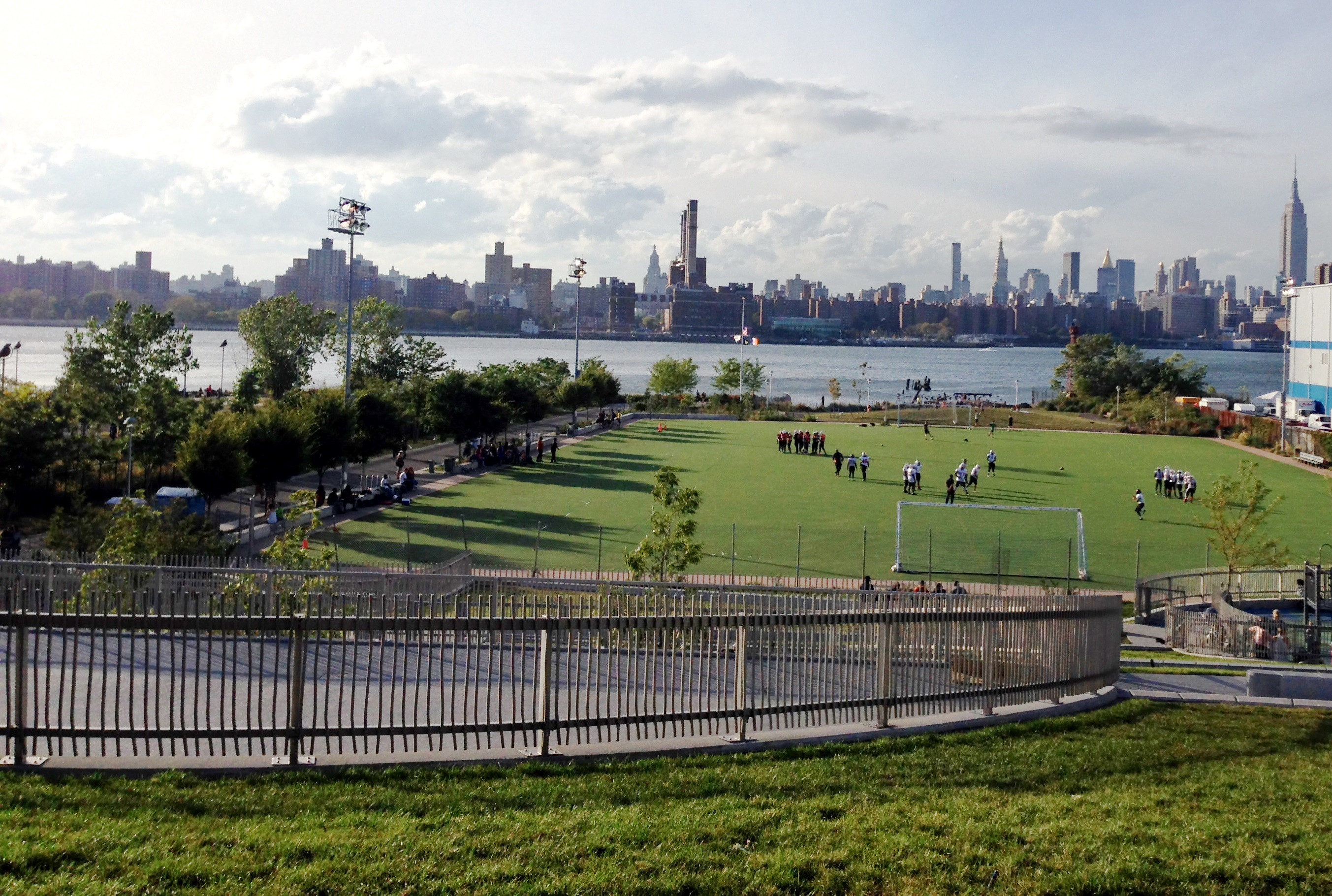
- (2013)
- Interactive map of Bushwick Inlet Park
- Type: Urban park
- Location: North 9th Street and Kent Avenue; Williamsburg, Brooklyn, New York City 11249; United States
- Coordinates: 40.7223°N 73.9613°W
- Area: 35.53 acres (14.38 ha)
- Operator: New York City Department of Parks and Recreation
- Open: All year
- Website: www.nycgovparks.org/parks/bushwick-inlet-park/

Bushwick Inlet Park is a public park in the Williamsburg and Greenpoint neighborhoods of Brooklyn, New York City. Located along the East River, the park is named for the nearby Bushwick Inlet, which it is planned to encompass upon completion.

Bushwick Inlet was originally at the mouth of Bushwick Creek, which was fed by two tributaries in Williamsburg. The site of the present-day park was used by manufacturing businesses in the mid-19th century, especially the Brooklyn Eastern District Terminal. By the late 19th century, Bushwick Creek had been used as a sewage outflow from the surrounding area. The creek itself was infilled through various stages, and the infill operations were completed by 1913. Plans for Bushwick Inlet Park were devised in 2005, during the rezoning of a 175-block area in Greenpoint and Williamsburg. However, acquisition of the land took several years and cost tens of millions of dollars. The city was able to complete the purchase of the land for the proposed park in 2016, after years of negotiations.

The park has opened in stages, beginning with a series of soccer and football fields, which opened in 2010, and a community center, which opened in 2013. The community center, which also houses offices for the New York City Department of Parks and Recreation, includes features intended to be environmentally sustainable, such as a sloping green roof, solar panels, and geothermal heating. In 2022, an elevated lawn opened on the site of a former pop-up park between North 11th and North 12th Streets. An additional parcel opened in 2026.

== Geography ==
Bushwick Inlet Park was named after the inlet of the same name, which stretches 1,000 feet (300 m) southeast of the East River shoreline. Bushwick Inlet, was originally at the mouth of Bushwick Creek, which provided it with two sources. One tributary extended to the present-day site of McCarren Park, while the other extended slightly south of that point. According to an 1854 account from the Brooklyn Eagle, the main tributary to McCarren Park formed the boundary between Williamsburg and Greenpoint. The branch leading to McCarren Park was once a marsh, but has since been filled in.

== History ==
=== Early development ===
Dutch settlers acquired the present-day site of Bushwick Inlet Park from the Lenape in 1638. Seven years later, a married couple, Dirck Volkertsen de Noorman and Christina Vigne, started the area's first farm along the creek. The Noorman farm was believed to have been at the present-day intersection of Franklin and Calyer Streets, two blocks north of Bushwick Inlet. At the time, Bushwick Inlet was unofficially referred to as "Noorman's Kil" during its early years; that name is retained by a bar in Williamsburg. Later, the creek was renamed after the nearby town of Bushwick, to the east of Williamsburg. The town, in turn, was named for the Dutch Boswijck, which translated to "little town in the woods" or "heavy woods".

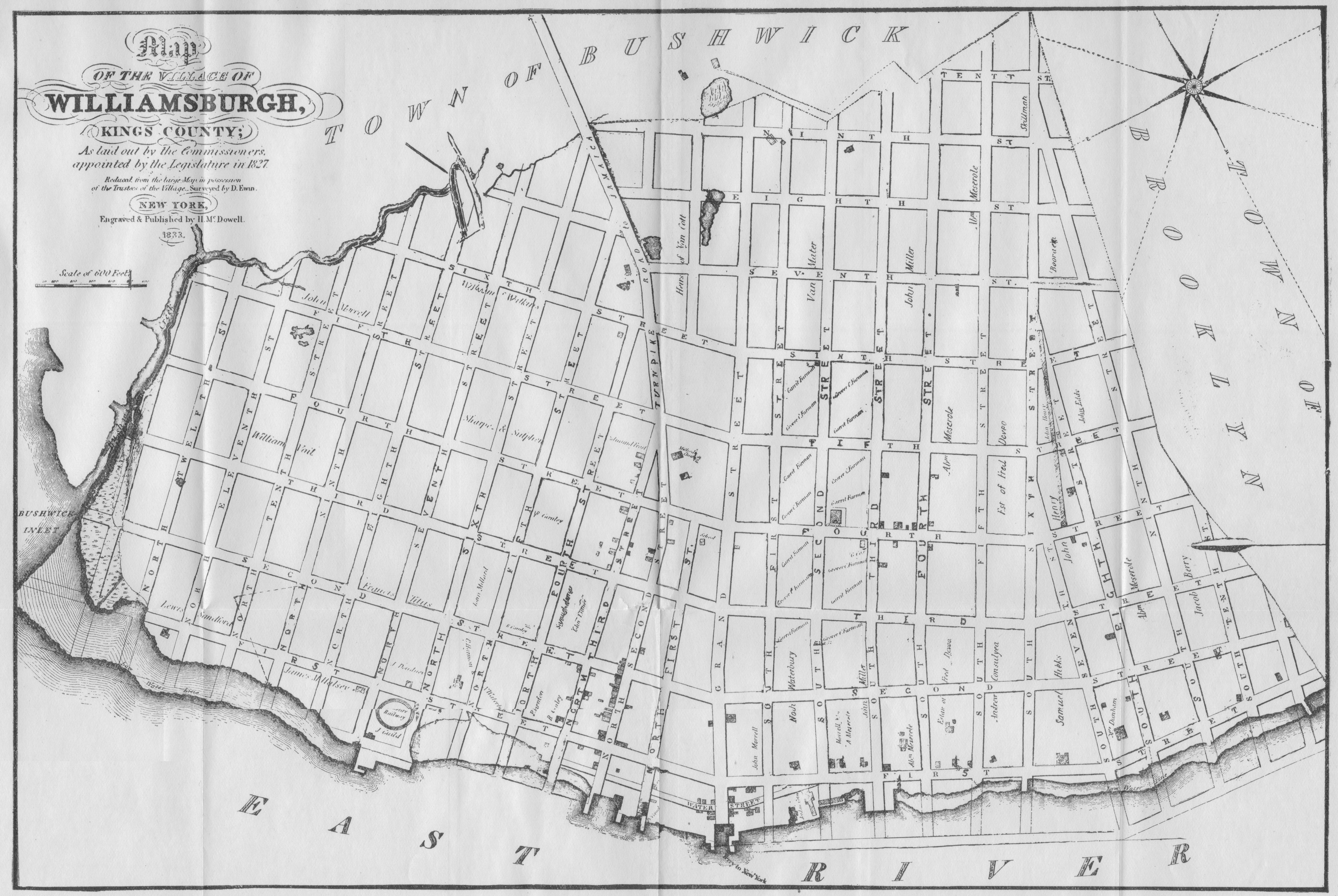
Map of Williamsburg in 1827, showing Bushwick Inlet as its border with Greenpoint, at left

The first bridge over Bushwick Inlet was built by Neziah Bliss, who also developed much of Greenpoint, in 1838. The bridge connected First Street in Williamsburg (present-day Kent Avenue) with Franklin Street in Greenpoint. By the mid-19th century, the area had become largely industrial, and buildings were erected around Bushwick Inlet's mouth. Charles Pratt founded the Astral Oil Works factory at the mouth of Bushwick Inlet in 1857. The former site of Astral Oil Works was later developed as the location of the Bayside Fuel Oil depot. The USS Monitor was built in the Continental Iron Works at Bushwick Inlet, and it was launched in October 1861. Subsequently, Monitor fought against the CSS Virginia in the Battle of Hampton Roads during the American Civil War. Ship manufacturing at Bushwick Creek had largely dwindled by 1889.

As early as 1854, there were proposals to convert Bushwick Creek into either a sewer or a canal. The bridge over the creek was replaced in 1869. A proposal to fill in Bushwick Creek, and replace it with a park, was brought forward in 1896. By then, the creek was being used as an outflow point for the surrounding area's sewage system. Property owners initially objected to the sewer because they would have to pay for it, even though the stench from Bushwick Creek's standing water permeated nearby properties. Covering the creek was seen as a way to mitigate these smells. Part of Bushwick Creek was filled in soon afterward.

The wetlands of Franklin Street and Kent Avenue were gradually infilled beginning in the 19th century. In 1905, a 42-acre (17 ha) section of the former marshlands was ceded to McCarren Park. The infill operation was completed by 1913. The bridge connecting Franklin Street and Kent Avenue was demolished, and the marsh in McCarren Park was filled in. During Prohibition in the 1920s, when the consumption of alcoholic beverages was banned, the remaining part of Bushwick Inlet was used as a route to smuggle alcohol.

=== Conversion into park ===
By the early 2000s, there were plans to develop the Williamsburg and Greenpoint waterfront. However, the city also required more electricity at the time, and a 1,100 megawatts (1,500,000 hp) power plant was being proposed for the Bayside Oil site. At the same time, the Greenpoint Monitor Museum was looking for funding to build a park and museum commemorating the USS Monitor. The museum would be at the former Continental Iron Works site on the northern shore of Bushwick Inlet. In 2003, the museum acquired one acre of parkland around Bushwick Inlet. The museum received $600,000 in funding in 2015, which was derived from a $19.2 settlement paid out as part of the cleanup of the Greenpoint oil spill in nearby Newtown Creek.

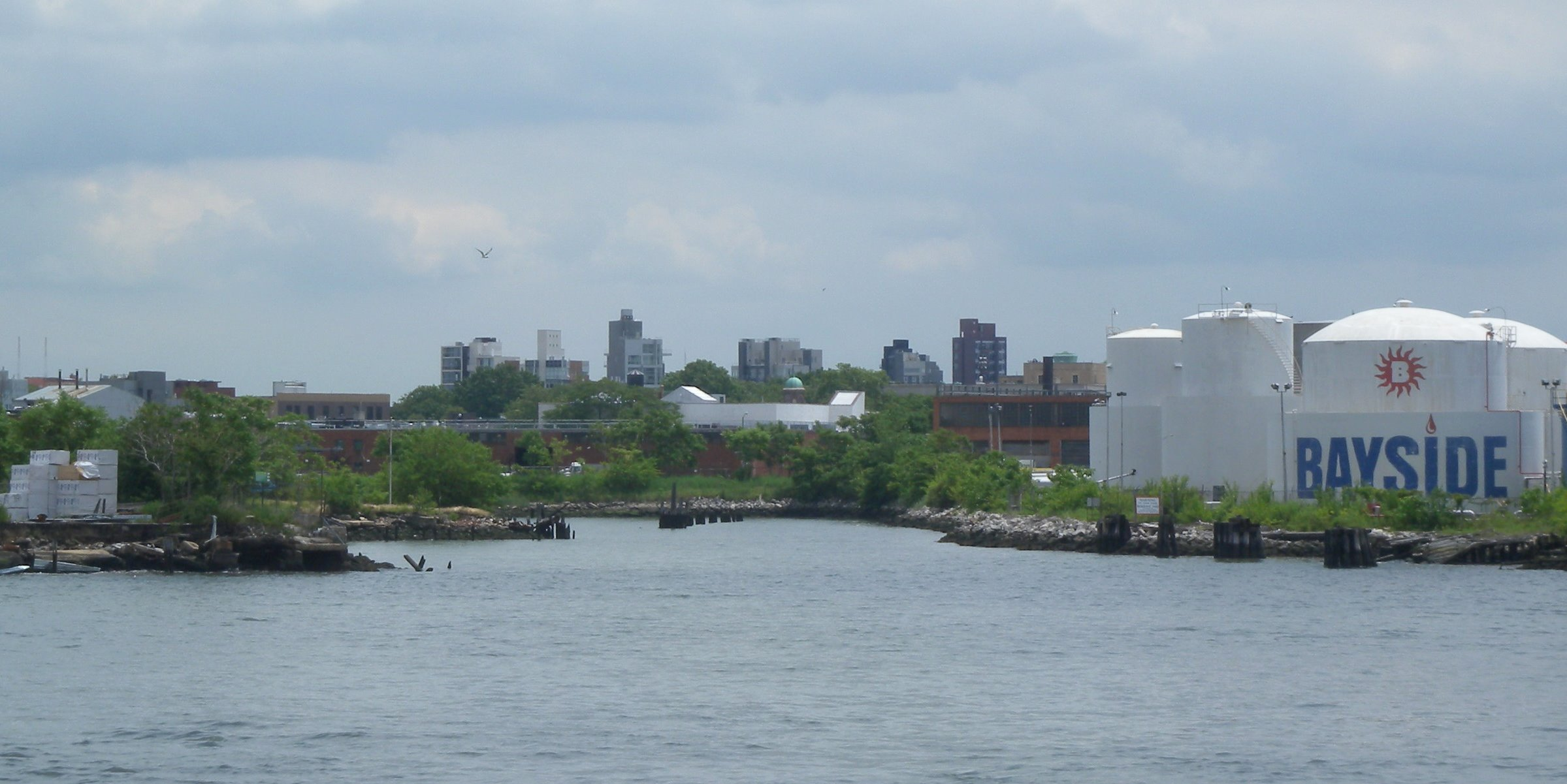
Bushwick Inlet, looking eastward from the East River in 2011. The now-former Bayside Fuel Oil facility can be seen at right. The park is envisioned to eventually be extended around the inlet.

In 2005, a 175-block area in Greenpoint and Williamsburg was rezoned under a plan approved by the administration of Mayor Michael Bloomberg. As a condition of the rezoning plan, the city promised to build a 28-acre (11 ha) public park around Bushwick Inlet, to be operated by the New York City Department of Parks and Recreation. This would be part of a combined system of waterfront parks in the two neighborhoods, with a total combined area of 54 acres (22 ha). The park would cost of $80 to $90 million. A shoreline esplanade between Newtown Creek and East River State Park would pass through the park and run around the inlet. The park would also contain a shared pedestrian and bicycle path. Under the 2005 rezoning plan, the park's programming would include a kayak launch, piers, and fishing areas, as well as the Monitor Museum on the northern side of the park. A subsequent plan in 2006 also called for the construction of athletic fields, a pedestrian-bike bridge, and a wildlife habitat. The original plans for the park included an Olympic-size swimming pool in or near Bushwick Inlet Park. There was also supposed to be a large central lawn near North 12th Street, a restaurant terrace near North 10th Street, and a scenic overlook at Bushwick Inlet. A boat launch would have been south of the Monitor Museum at Quay Street, leading into the inlet. In the northern portion of the park, along the north shore of Bushwick Inlet, there was to be a beach. Entrances would have been at North 9th and North 12th Streets, and a comfort station would have been at 9th Street.

In 2007, the city acquired two parcels for Bushwick Inlet Park west of Kent Avenue between North 7th and North 10th Streets, seizing the properties for public use through the process of eminent domain, and used it to create the first 11-acre (4.5 ha) part of the park. Over the next several years, plans for developing the park stalled. The largest impediment to developing the park was an 11-acre parcel occupied by a warehouse for the company CitiStorage, which was in the middle of the proposed parkland. The city had spent $95 million to acquire just the initial 8.7-acre (3.5 ha) plot of land for Bushwick Inlet Park; this amounted to about $10.9 million per acre. Another 2.5-acre (1.0 ha) parcel was purchased for $30 million. CitiStorage's owner, Norman Brodsky, was asking for a similar per-acre price for his land, which he had purchased in the 1990s for $5 million. Brodsky did not necessarily oppose the construction of Bushwick Inlet Park, but wanted to profit from the potential increases in land value that the construction of the park would provide. The New York Times estimated that at this rate, it would cost $120 million to acquire the CitiStorage parcel, and NYC Parks was not willing to pay this much. Brodsky later raised his sale price to a half-billion dollars. Moreover, the Monitor Museum would not cede its acre of land to the city.

Two park facilities were constructed starting in 2009. The soccer and football fields opened in summer 2010, and the community center opened three years later in October 2013. By 2015, the soccer and football fields and the community center were the only parts of the park that had been built. The construction of these two facilities cost $25.8 million, in addition to the $150 million cost of acquiring the land under these facilities. The rest of the proposed parkland that had already been purchased lay unused and was used as an illegal dumping space, while negotiations to purchase the rest of the park's land progressed. In April 2014, the city purchased a plot from gas an oil company Motiva Enterprises for $4.65 million. That December, the city allocated $4.6 million toward the cleanup of the Bushwick Inlet site for future conversion to parkland.

=== Acquisition of final land plots ===
In January 2015, the CitiStorage warehouse suffered severe fire damage. After the fire, advocates again pushed the city to create a park on the site, and residents petitioned for the park to be completed. Initially, Mayor Bill de Blasio did not include the completion of Bushwick Inlet Park in his long-range plans for the city, but he ultimately acquiesced and made plans to purchase the remaining parcels after protests from activists. To date, the cost of acquiring land for Bushwick Inlet Park had reached $225 million. This was more than the entire cost for the High Line elevated park in Manhattan, and it was almost the same amount as the cost for Hudson River Park, also in Manhattan. Politicians proposed to cover the park's increasing price tag by levying property taxes on nearby developments. The city announced in 2015 that it had made tentative agreement with Bayside Fuel to purchase its 7-acre (2.8 ha) parcel. In March 2016, the city bought the Bayside Fuel plot for $53 million. De Blasio stated that he would not allow the land to be rezoned for residential use.

Meanwhile, negotiations with CitiStorage's owner Brodsky continued for over a year after the warehouse burned down. New York City Council members Joe Lentol and Steve Levin, who respectively represented Williamsburg and Greenpoint, acted as mediators between the city and Brodsky, who could not agree upon a final sale price. Levin stated that he would block any proposed rezoning of the CitiStorage site, because he intended for that site to become part of the completed Bushwick Inlet Park. Other politicians representing the area, including U.S. representative Carolyn Maloney, Brooklyn borough president Eric Adams, New York City public advocate Letitia James, and New York state senator Daniel Squadron also advocated for the park. Maloney stated that the city should forcibly acquire Brodsky's land through eminent domain. The ensuing discussions between Brodsky and the city brought the value of the land into question. According to Crain's New York magazine, real estate experts stated that a low estimate for the value of CitiStorage's land would be between $120 million and $180 million, while Brodsky himself was asking for up to $325 million for the land.

In July 2016, activists including U.S. representative Maloney held a "sleep-in" protest on the site of the CitiStorage lot, in an effort to convince the city into purchasing the CitiStorage land. Activists continued to hold protests and rallies to draw government officials' attention to the park proposal. In addition to the sleep-in protest, they also organized in kayaks and canoes, and held a mock funeral for the park. In November 2016, eleven years after Bushwick Inlet Park was first proposed, Brodsky and the city finally came to an agreement, and the city purchased the 11-acre CitiStorage site for $160 million. The city now had possession of all of the land for Bushwick Inlet Park, except for the Monitor Museum plot. Ultimately, the New York City government had spent $350 million on land acquisition for Bushwick Inlet Park, excluding the $25.8 million spent on developing the soccer and football fields and the community center.

=== Completion of park ===
In 2016, a proposal for the ten Bayside Oil tanks on the site, entitled "Maker Park", was unveiled. The Maker Park plan would convert the oil tankers into attractions such as a theater and hanging gardens. It directly conflicted with the original plan for Bushwick Inlet Park, which would see the tankers demolished. The city stated that the oil tankers were heavily polluted, and that the site needed to be cleaned before it could be repurposed into a park. The Maker Park plan, rebranded as the Tanks at Bushwick Inlet Park, was ultimately declined, and the city started demolishing the tanks in late 2019.

In October 2017, the city allocated $17.5 million to develop the rest of Bushwick Inlet Park. The Bushwick Inlet Popup Park, a temporary public space between North 11th and North 12th Streets, opened in May 2018 and operated during the summer. The pop-up park consisted of a 1.8-acre (0.73 ha) lawn. A permanent design for the popup park, to cost $7.7 million, was approved in late 2018. The permanent replacement for the popup opened on weekends starting in April 2022, and it began operating on weekdays in June 2022. In mid-2020, Brooklyn Community Board 1 approved Abel Bainnson Butz's design for parkland along the inlet. This plot occupies the former Motiva site on Kent Avenue between Quay and North 14th Streets. A previous design for that site had been declined because it had included too many paths. By January 2021, the Motiva plot was still in planning, but construction was proposed to start later in 2021. At the end of that year, the city government announced it would spend $75 million to demolish the CitiStorage warehouse and construct the park's next phase on that site.

NYC Parks began redeveloping the Motiva site in March 2024, at which point that project was slated to take two years. The Motiva site was expected to cost $9.8 million to redevelop. Work on clearing the CitiStorage site began in mid-2024. Meanwhile, the Metropolitan Transportation Authority, which owned a parcel abutting the northern end of the park, selected a developer to construct two skyscrapers on the site in 2025 as part of the 40 Quay project. This prompted local residents to ask that the parcel instead be added to Bushwick Inlet Park. After the Motiva site was completed, it was fenced off for several months while the new plantings there were left to grow; the Motiva site opened in April 2026. The completion of the Motiva site coincided with disputes over the neighboring 40 Quay site (since renamed Monitor Point); the development there received city approval that May. The Motiva parcel included a beach, which was opened theat June and was described in news media as Brooklyn's smallest beach. The New York City Council also approved the Monitor Park development in June 2026, conditional on the developers finishing Bushwick Inlet Park and paying for upgrades to the New York City Subway's nearby Nassau Avenue station.

== Description ==
Map of current and future park site

As of 2026, Bushwick Inlet Park covers 35.53 acres (14.38 ha). It is part of a planned shoreline park area along Greenpoint and Williamsburg's industrial riverfront, which would stretch continuously from Newtown Creek to East River State Park at North Seventh Street. A 3.5-acre (1.4 ha) section of Bushwick Inlet Park between North 9th and North 10th Streets is open to the public. This section contains playing fields for soccer and American football, as well as playground and restrooms. The park also contains a community center building, which also houses administrative offices. The administrative offices occupy the northern section of the building, facing the East River to the west, while the community center occupies the southern section, facing Kent Avenue to the east. The community center is operated by the Open Space Alliance, a nonprofit organization. Both facilities are on the former site of a parking lot for car rentals.

A 1.89-acre (0.76 ha) northern section of the park, between North 11th and North 12th Street, opened to the public in 2022. It includes benches, paths, and an artificial hill with an elevated lawn. In addition, this section contains several thousand plantings, some stone seating, and a small water playground.

To the north, along the inlet, is a 1.8-acre (0.73 ha) parcel known as the Motiva site. It opened in 2026 and includes plants, a footpath, and a kayak launch. The inlet contains plants such as Ailanthus, Morus, and a number of invasive or non-native plants, which support the local wildlife. At least one group has also proposed adding a sanctuary for feral cats within the park. As part of the original plan for Bushwick Inlet Park, there would have been a lookout boardwalk along the shore of Bushwick Inlet.

East River State Park, which is separately administered by the New York state government, is directly south of Bushwick Inlet Park, on the former Brooklyn Eastern District Terminal site. Both parks are close to the NYC Ferry system's North Williamsburg pier at North 6th Street.

=== Environmental features ===
The roof of the 13,300-square-foot (1,240 m^{2}) community center, designed by Kiss + Cathcart, contains a public landscape looking out to the East River and the Manhattan skyline. The new building adds venues for both community programs and park operations. The building is covered by a green roof that is accessible to the public. The roof slopes down to ground level on the western side of the building, facing the East River. A meandering path up the grassy slope serves a series of activity areas, and the top of the building contains a shaded overlook.

When it opened in 2013, the building had the highest percentage of on-site solar energy generation, green roof irrigation entirely from rainfall and reclaimed water, and zero stormwater discharge to the combined sewer. The building reduces energy consumption by using systems such as geothermal heat pumps. A 66-kilowatt photovoltaic array is atop the shade structure along Kent Avenue, and was designed to generate half of the building's annual energy usage. Although the building is under a hill, all public interior spaces are lit by skylights. In 2014, the Bushwick Inlet Park Community Center was listed on the American Institute of Architects' list of top ten sites for sustainable architecture.
