= Marsha P. Johnson State Park =

Public park in Brooklyn, New York

- East River State Park
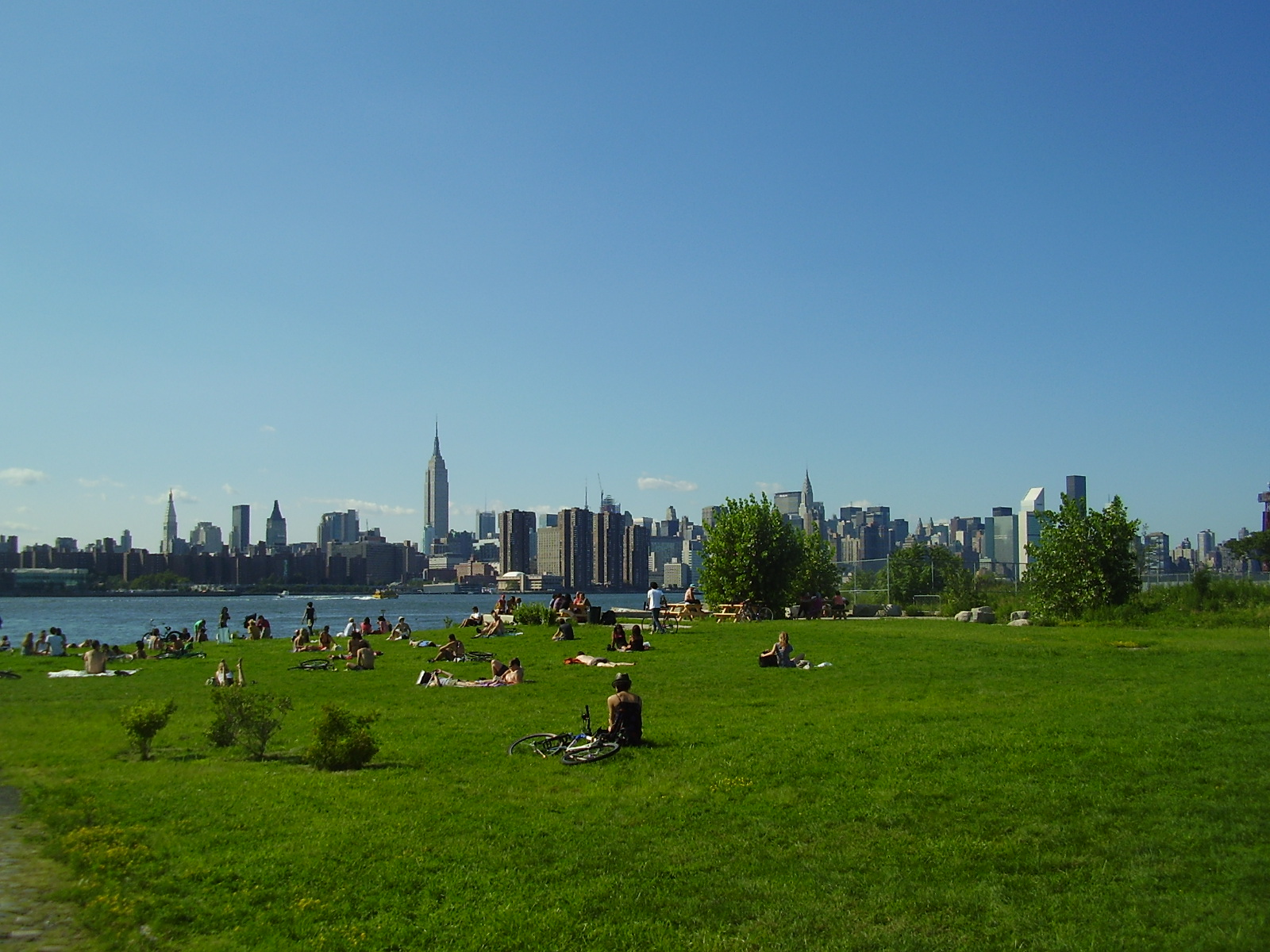
- View of Marsha P. Johnson State Park with the East River and Midtown Manhattan in the background
- Interactive map of Marsha P. Johnson State Park
- Type: State park
- Location: Williamsburg, Brooklyn, New York, U.S.
- Nearest city: New York City
- Coordinates: 40°43′18″N 73°57′44″W
- Area: 11 acres (4.5 ha)
- Created: 2007
- Operator: New York State Office of Parks, Recreation and Historic Preservation
- Visitors: 1,464,993 (in 2014)
- Open: Year round

Marsha P. Johnson State Park (formerly and also known as East River State Park) is an 11-acre (4.5 ha) state park in the Williamsburg neighborhood of Brooklyn in New York City, New York, U.S. The park stretches along the East River near North 7th, 8th, and 9th Streets, with views of the Williamsburg Bridge and Midtown Manhattan.

East River State Park opened in 2007 on the site of the Brooklyn Eastern District Terminal. The park was renamed in honor of gay rights activist Marsha P. Johnson in 2020, becoming the first New York state park to be named after an LGBTQ person.

== History ==
Marsha P. Johnson State Park is built on the former site of the Brooklyn Eastern District Terminal, the first offline railroad terminal to be located in Brooklyn (opened in 1870 as Palmer's Dock). It is adjacent to the city-run Bushwick Inlet Park. The park opened on May 26, 2007, and was originally known as East River State Park. Unlike other nearby parks, it closes at dusk. State park rules prohibit dogs and bicycle riding.

In 2009, the music concerts that were held at the McCarren Park Pool were relocated to the East River State Park. The Open Space Alliance for North Brooklyn (OSA) selected the East River State Park as the site for future performances. The park has been nicknamed the Williamsburg Waterfront. Through a public/private partnership the Open Space Alliance and Ticketmaster, live music performances will be held through the summer months at the East River State Park.

=== Renaming and renovation ===
On February 1, 2020, Governor Andrew Cuomo of New York announced that the East River State Park in Brooklyn would be renamed in honor of gay rights activist Marsha P. Johnson. New York state governor Andrew Cuomo formally rededicated the park on August 24, 2020, on the 75th anniversary of Johnson's birth. At the renaming, Cuomo also announced the addition of art and signage within the park that would reflect Johnson's work. The state government closed parts of the park in early 2021, adding trees, paths, gardens, and event spaces as part of a renovation. The state originally planned to commission a mural honoring Johnson, but these plans were scrapped in mid-2021 after community members and activists criticized the lack of public input for the plans.

In August 2022, on the 77th anniversary of Johnson's birth, governor Kathy Hochul announced that a new gate to the park would be constructed as part of a renovation. The gateway would contain floral decorations, which Johnson frequently wore, and the words "Pay it no mind", which Johnson sardonically said was what her middle initial stood for. A new park design was introduced in 2022 based on community engagement by Starr Whitehouse Landscape Architects, with more green space and plantings reflecting Marsha P. Johnson's love of fresh flowers.

== Gallery ==
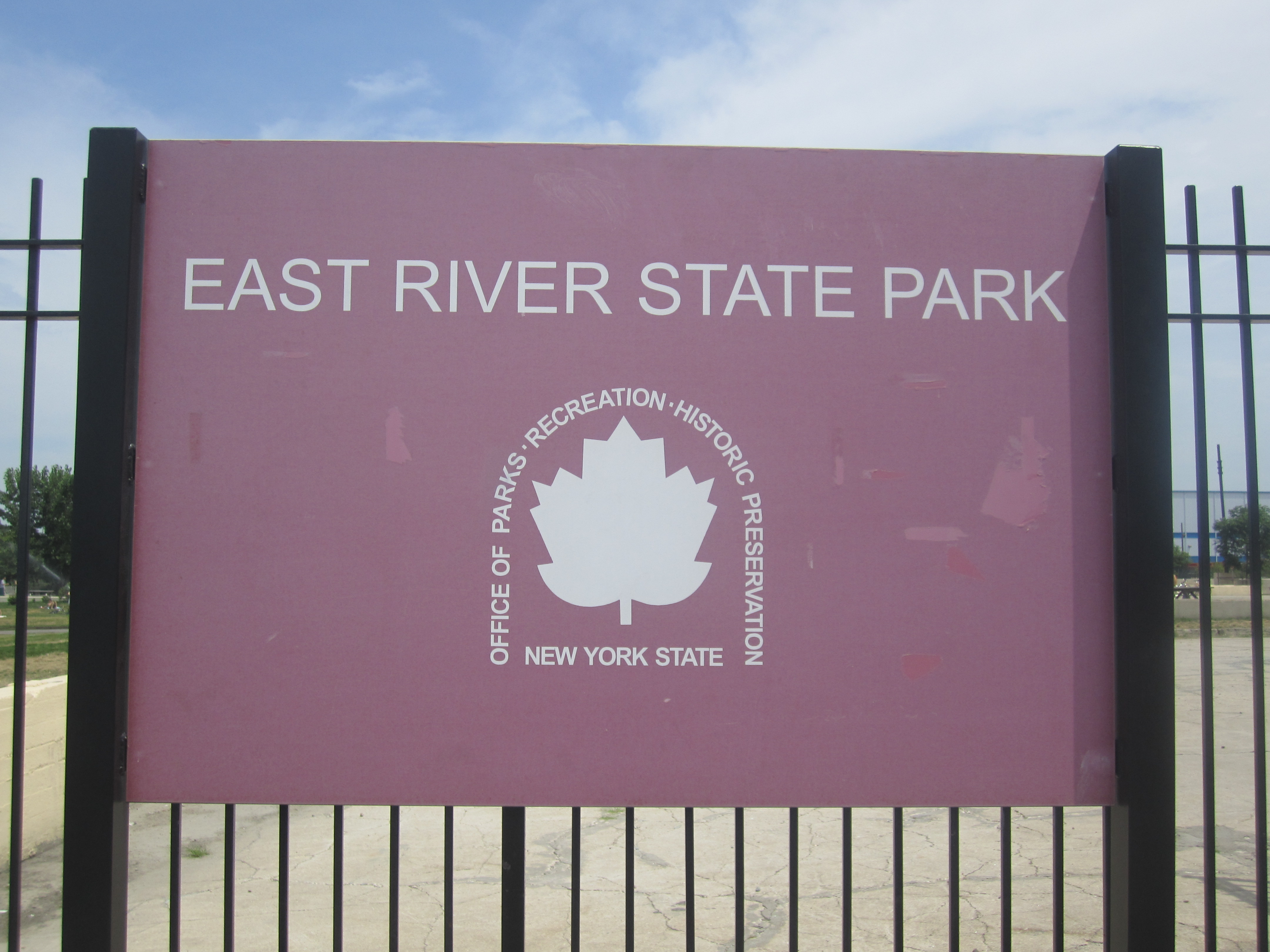
Entrance sign

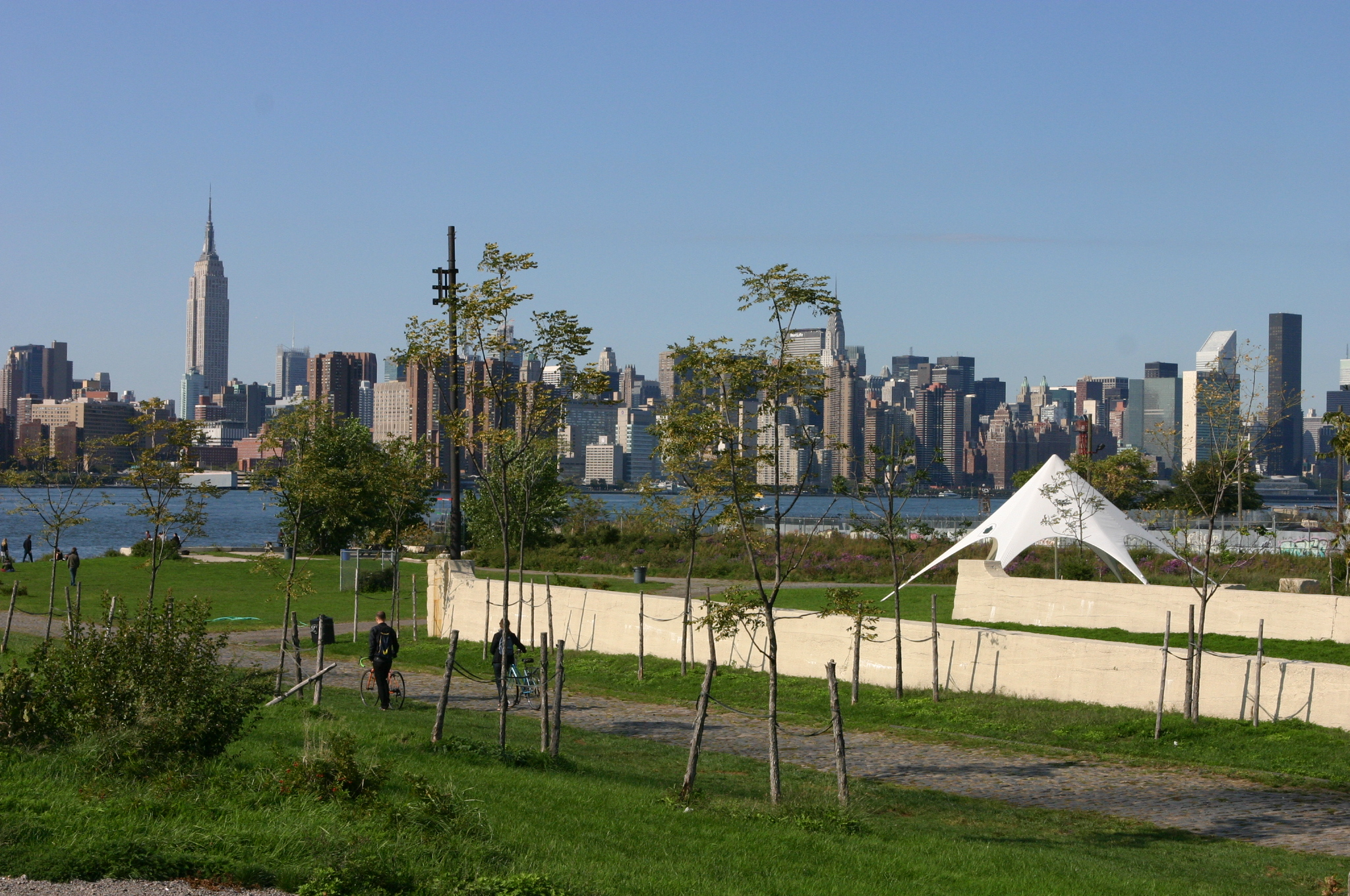
Facilities in the park

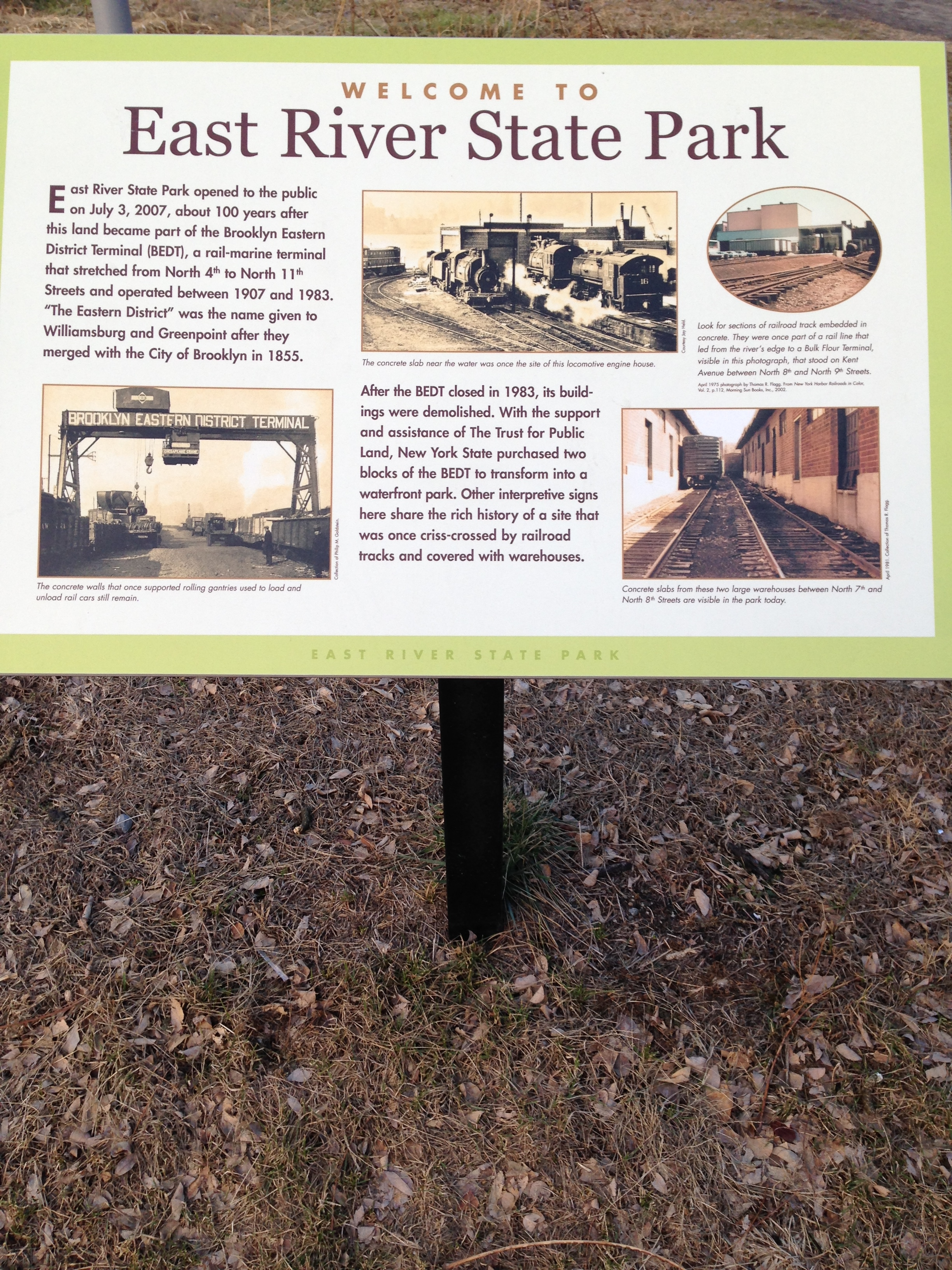
One of five historic information boards inside the park

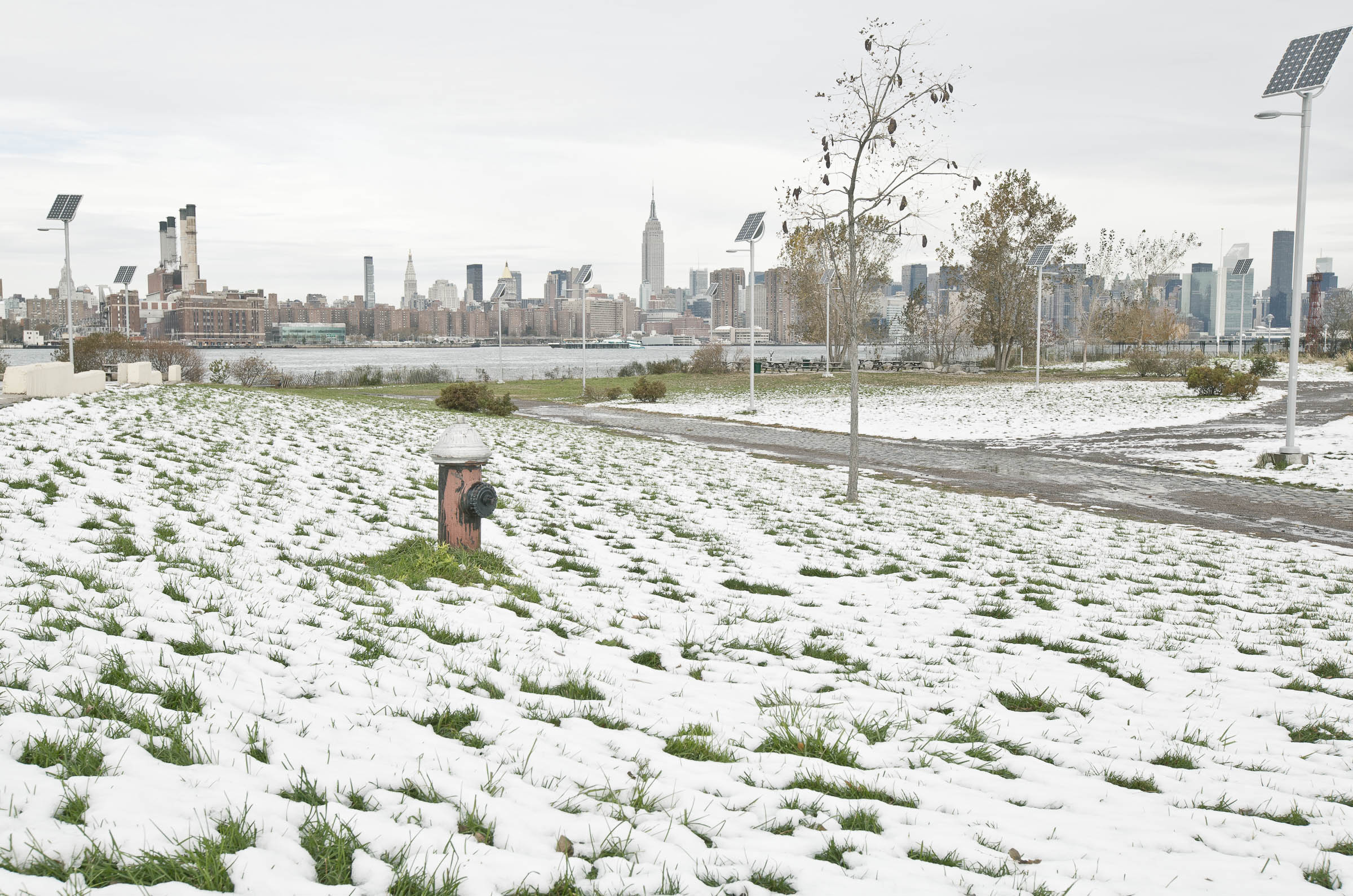
The park in winter

== See also ==
- List of New York state parks
- List of parks in New York City
