= Toledo, Lake Erie and Western Railway =

Heritage railroad and railroad museum in Ohio

Toledo, Lake Erie & Western Railway and Museum
Overview
- Headquarters: Grand Rapids, Ohio
- Reporting mark: TLEW
- Locale: Lucas and Wood counties, Ohio, U.S.
- Dates of operation: 1969–present
- Predecessor: Toledo, St. Louis and Western Railroad (Clover Leaf); Nickel Plate Road; Norfolk and Western Railway

Technical
- Track gauge: 4 ft 8 1/2 in (1,435 mm) standard gauge
- Length: 10 miles (16 km)

Other
- Website: tlew.org

The Toledo, Lake Erie and Western Railway and Museum (reporting mark TLEW), commonly styled TLE&W or TLEW, is a volunteer-run 501(c)(3) nonprofit heritage railroad and railroad museum in Grand Rapids, Ohio. Founded in 1965 and incorporated in 1969, it preserves about 10 miles (16 km) of the former Toledo, St. Louis and Western Railroad—the Clover Leaf route—between Waterville and Grand Rapids. That line later became part of the Nickel Plate Road and the Norfolk and Western Railway.

The line crosses the Maumee River on a 901 ft (275 m) through-truss bridge completed in 1916 after the Great Flood of 1913 destroyed the earlier crossing. The organization describes the span as the longest railroad bridge owned by a tourist railroad east of the Mississippi River.

TLE&W is best known for the Bluebird excursion train, which carried passengers along the Maumee Valley from 1969 until regular service paused in 2009. The museum now operates seasonal motorcar rides over the river crossing while volunteers rebuild track and equipment under a phased plan to return limited passenger service.

== History of the line ==
The corridor was constructed in the 1870s as part of the Toledo–St. Louis route operated by the Toledo, St. Louis and Western Railroad, widely known as the Clover Leaf. After floodwaters destroyed the original Maumee River crossing at Grand Rapids in 1913, a six-span through-truss bridge was built in 1916. The Clover Leaf later passed to the New York, Chicago and St. Louis Railroad (Nickel Plate Road) and, in 1964, to the Norfolk and Western Railway.

When N&W moved to abandon the line south of Waterville, TLE&W acquired the railroad from about milepost 15 in Waterville to milepost 25 in Grand Rapids. The organization also leased track from milepost 13.2 to milepost 15 through Waterville from N&W, which became Norfolk Southern in 1982.

At Grand Rapids the railroad crosses above the preserved Miami and Erie Canal and present-day State Route 424 / South River Road, a stacked view of canal, railroad, and highway eras in the same landscape.

== Formation and the Bluebird ==
Railroad enthusiasts organized the Toledo, Lake Erie & Western in 1965 and incorporated it as a nonprofit in 1969. The Bluebird Special—later called the Bluebird or Bluebird Express—began excursion service on June 1, 1969, first from Dorr Street and Secor Road in Toledo, Ohio, using a rented steam locomotive and borrowed cabooses. Donated Wabash Railroad coaches soon replaced the borrowed cars; lighter New York Central Railroad commuter coaches were later used to increase seating.

Urban operating constraints in Toledo, including long backup moves across city streets, led the group to relocate onto the Waterville–Grand Rapids segment after N&W ended through freight there. The first Bluebird run on that line took place in 1974, with Baldwin 0-6-0 No. 202.

The train became a familiar outing in the Maumee Valley. A 2003 account in The Blade reported that the operation had carried more than 500,000 passengers over the years and was then working to restore Waterville boarding after a gap in service.

== Suspension and later years ==
Regular Bluebird passenger service was suspended in 2009 for track work. A planned return in 2010 did not take place. In the years that followed the organization reported vandalism and theft of equipment, including a Nathan M5 horn intended for ALCO S-4 No. 5109 after that locomotive was repainted in Chesapeake and Ohio Railway colors in 2013. A for-profit freight partnership arranged in the early 2010s ended when the lease terminated on December 31, 2014. Volunteers then concentrated on the museum site, track, and passenger equipment.

On February 14, 2014, TLE&W acquired the former Waterfront Electric Railway Museum property at 17475 Saylor Lane in Grand Rapids, adding a shop, car barn, and exhibit space. The museum held an open house on the site on May 10, 2014. A static display consist nearer downtown Grand Rapids, including locomotives No. 1 and No. 202, has been used for exhibits and special events.

The organization now describes itself as a museum with railroad operations: it began as the group that ran the Bluebird, later took on a museum, and is restoring passenger service so families can ride the Clover Leaf again.

== Current operations ==
=== Motorcar rides ===
While the Bluebird remains out of regular service, TLE&W operates seasonal motorcar trips from Grand Rapids. The advertised 2026 season runs Saturdays and Sundays from noon to 5:00 p.m. through October 31, weather permitting. The short narrated ride crosses the 1916 Maumee River bridge and continues to the Grand Rapids Road platform.

Published 2026 fares are $6.25 for adults and $4.25 for children ages 3–12 by card, or $6 and $4 cash. The museum directs weather checks to (419) 878-2177, option 2, after 11:00 a.m.

=== Bluebird return ===
The museum has published a four-phase plan to resume passenger service. Phase I, described as in progress as of 2026, would establish limited operation between Patton Road (milepost 21.7) and Jeffers Road (milepost 23.3). Published work for that phase includes replacing about 1,500 mainline ties, culvert and vegetation work, a new loading platform at Yawberg Road, coach repairs, crew qualification, and public notifications. Later phases would extend operation west toward Front Street and milepost 25, then farther along the line as track is renewed.

Public updates in 2025 and 2026 documented rehabilitation of C&O ALCO S-4 No. 5109, including axle repair and the reinstallation of hanging steps and brake rigging completed on August 29, 2026; rebuilding of the Patton Road crossing; re-decking and repainting of Wabash flat car 553; and work on motorcars and maintenance machinery. The museum has identified Federal Railroad Administration certification of No. 5109 as a remaining requirement before the locomotive can legally pull passenger trains.

WTOL reported in 2025 that volunteers were working Phase I track near the Ludwig Road crossing and that Durrell Johnson described the project as a way for a new generation to understand how the valley once moved people and freight.

== Museum and collection ==
The museum and shop are at 17475 Saylor Lane in Grand Rapids. The mailing address is P.O. Box 168, Waterville, Ohio 43566. The indoor museum closed for renovation and, according to the organization, that work restarted on August 15, 2026, with a planned reopening in May 2027. Outdoor equipment remains on view, and the museum has begun an online catalog and interpretive signs for the outdoor collection.

TLE&W states that it gives first priority to artifacts from the Clover Leaf route and the trains that used it, then to other local and regional railroads. The collection includes equipment associated with the Chesapeake and Ohio, Baltimore and Ohio, Penn Central, Conrail, and Norfolk and Western. An online collections portal listed 19 asset profiles as of June 2026.

The Andersons Foundation granted $5,140 in 2024 toward repair of locomotive 5109 as part of Phase I.

== Organization ==
TLE&W is an all-volunteer educational nonprofit. The Internal Revenue Service classifies it as a history museum (NTEE A54).

In August 2026 the board elected Durrell Johnson president after Rick Westphal stepped down, effective August 8, 2026. Johnson is a career railroad employee with CSX Transportation. Longtime treasurer Frank Oles resigned for medical reasons. Andy Ciesler, who rebuilt the public website launched in March 2026, became director of digital and museum programs.

== Equipment ==
Publicly described locomotives include:

Locomotives
Number	Type	Built	Builder	Notes	Status (as of 2026)
1	44-DE-22	1941	Whitcomb	Ex-Ann Arbor Railroad; serial 60035	Stored, awaiting restoration
62	ALCO S-2	1946	American Locomotive Company	Serial 74663	Display
112	ALCO S-2	1942	American Locomotive Company	Serial 69921; long used as a parts source for No. 5109	Display
202	0-6-0	1920	Baldwin Locomotive Works	Built as Detroit Edison 202; serial 52792; first Waterville–Grand Rapids Bluebird power in 1974	Display
5109	ALCO S-4	1953	American Locomotive Company	Ex-Chesapeake and Ohio 5109; serial 80633; primary Bluebird diesel since 1999	Under restoration toward FRA certification

A former H.K. Porter 0-6-0ST, No. 15 (builder's number 5966, 1917), left the roster and is at the Strasburg Rail Road. Other cars described in museum materials include Nickel Plate bay-window caboose 475, Wabash flat car 553 (re-decked and repainted in 2026), and a 1932 Baltimore and Ohio heavyweight coach used as a museum and meeting car.
