= Strasburg Rail Road =

Heritage railroad in Pennsylvania

Coordinates: 39°58′59.3″N 76°9′35.5″W

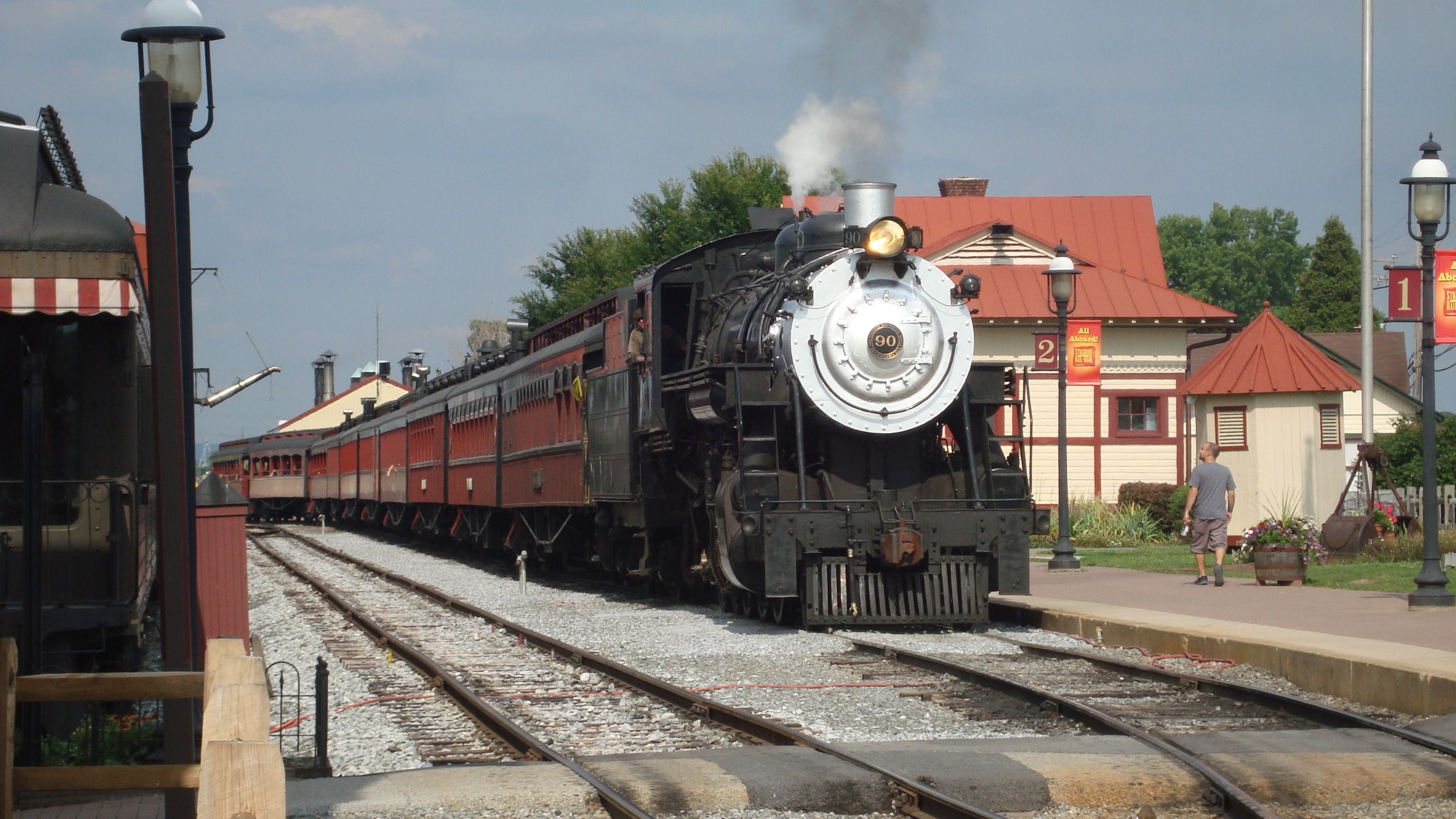
- No. 90 pulling into East Strasburg station in July 2014

Overview
- Headquarters: Strasburg, Pennsylvania, U.S.
- Reporting mark: SRC
- Locale: Strasburg and Paradise Townships, Lancaster County, Pennsylvania
- Dates of operation: 1832–present

Technical
- Track gauge: 4 ft 8 1/2 in (1,435 mm) standard gauge
- Length: 4.02 mi (6.47 km)

Other
- Website: strasburgrailroad.com

The Strasburg Rail Road (reporting mark SRC) is a heritage railroad and the oldest continuously operating standard-gauge railroad in the western hemisphere, as well as the oldest public utility in the Commonwealth of Pennsylvania. Chartered in 1832, the Strasburg Rail Road Company is today a heritage railroad offering excursion trains hauled by steam locomotives on 4.02 mi (6.47 km) of track in Pennsylvania Dutch Country, as well as providing contract railroad mechanical services, freight service to area shippers, and a hub for steam locomotive restoration projects. The railroad's headquarters are outside Strasburg, Pennsylvania. The railroad hosts 300,000 visitors per year.

The Strasburg Rail Road is one of the few railroads in the U.S. sometimes using steam locomotives to haul revenue freight trains. The adjacent Railroad Museum of Pennsylvania occasionally uses Strasburg Rail Road tracks to connect to the Amtrak Philadelphia-to-Harrisburg Main Line Leaman Place junction in Paradise.

== History ==
By the 1820s, the canal system had replaced the Conestoga wagon as the primary method of overland transportation. When the Susquehanna Canal opened, the majority of goods were directed through Baltimore, Maryland, rather than Philadelphia. The small amount of goods that were destined for Philadelphia traveled via a wagon road through Strasburg. Philadelphia attempted to reclaim its position as a major port city by constructing the Philadelphia and Columbia Railroad in 1831. A railroad was easier and more cost effective to build than a canal. Because the new railroad would bypass Strasburg and cause Strasburg to lose its livelihood, a group of businessmen petitioned the state government for the right to build their own railroad to connect Strasburg to the Philadelphia and Columbia. A charter was issued by the Pennsylvania Legislature with the signature of Governor George Wolf on June 9, 1832 to "incorporate the Strasburg rail road [sic]".

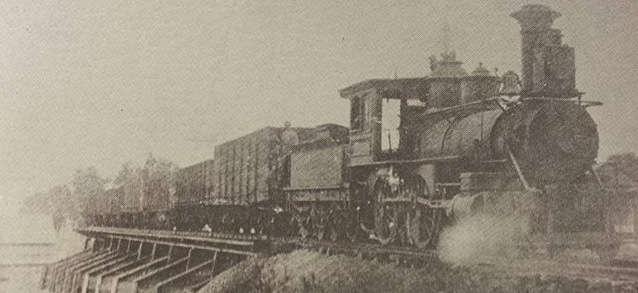
Ex-PRR 4-4-0 No. 929 hauling a hopper train in Strasburg around 1894

Although the pre-1852 history of the Strasburg Rail Road is sketchy, it is believed that the line was graded in 1835 and was operational by 1837. The railroad operated as a horse-drawn railroad until it purchased a second-hand Norris-built, 4-2-0 steam locomotive named the William Penn in 1851. Controlling interest in the railroad was purchased by John F. and Cyrus N. Herr in 1863. The rails were replaced around the same time with heavier ones to accommodate the locomotive. In 1866, the Herrs were granted a charter to extend the Strasburg Rail Road to Quarryville; surveys were carried out, but the extension was eventually canceled because of an economic depression.

Isaac Groff managed The Strasburg Rail Road for about 20 years until the fire of January 16, 1871, which destroyed the depot, grist and merchant mill, planing mill and machine shop — in all, more than $50,000 worth of property, equal to $1,343,750 today. In 1878, the Strasburg Rail Road and the shops were sold. The railroad was sold again in 1888 to Edward Musselman, with the Musselman family retaining control of it until 1918 when it was purchased by State Senator John Homsher. By this time, the number of passengers had dropped off because tracks for the Conestoga Traction Company's streetcars had reached Strasburg in 1908, offering a more direct route between Lancaster and Strasburg.

In 1926, the Strasburg Rail Road purchased a 20-short-ton (17.9-long-ton; 18.1 t), gasoline-powered, Plymouth switcher locomotive — the only locomotive that was ever built specifically for the Strasburg Rail Road. By 1958, the railroad fell on hard times from the cumulative effect of years of declining freight business and infrequent runs, damage caused by Hurricane Hazel, and lack of approval for operation of the Plymouth locomotive by inspectors from the Interstate Commerce Commission.

Upon the death of Bryson Homsher, the Homsher estate filed for abandonment with the Pennsylvania Public Utility Commission. Learning of the potential abandonment, an effort to purchase and save the railroad was organized by railfans from Lancaster Henry K. Long and Donald E. L. Hallock. They organized a small non-profit group to purchase the railroad. After the better part of a year of hard work, the purchase was completed on November 1, 1958. A week later, the first carload of revenue freight was hauled to what was then the only customer, a mill in Strasburg.

Tourist excursion service began on January 4, 1959, and the first steam locomotive arrived in June the following year.

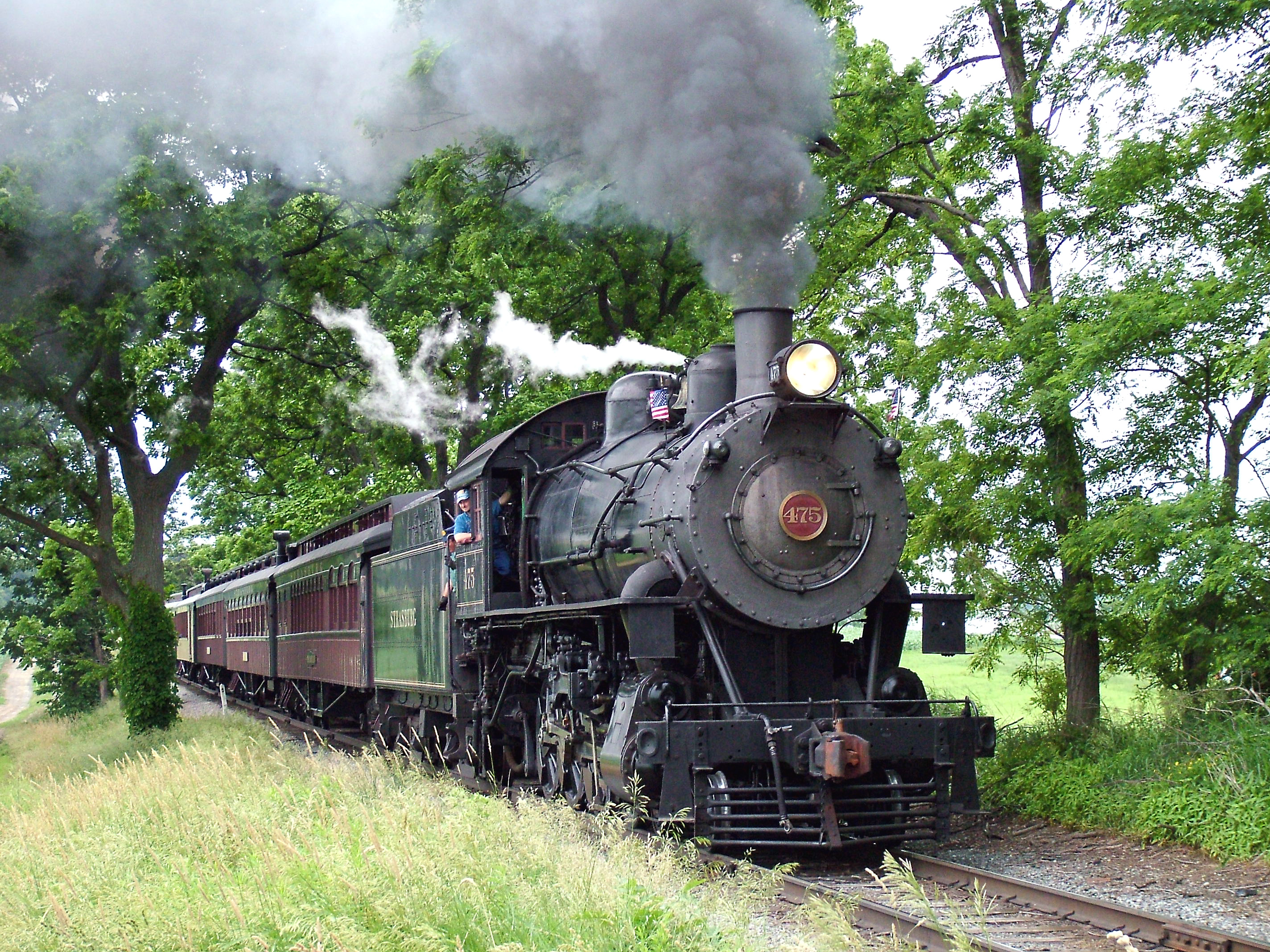
No. 475 hauling an excursion train in 2004

Today, the line carries passengers on a 45-minute round-trip journey from East Strasburg to Leaman Place Junction through nearly 2,500 acres (1,000 ha) in southeastern Lancaster County. A percentage of each train ticket's revenue is contributed to the Lancaster Farmland Trust.

The railroad operates the United States' only operational wooden dining car on which visitors may dine while riding. Attractions at the station include the fully operational 15 in (381 mm) gauge Pint-Sized Pufferbelly (Cagney steam-powered ridable miniature railway), a vintage pump car and several c.1930s "cranky cars", along with several gift shops and a cafe.

The railroad's mechanical and car shops maintain and restore locomotives and rolling stock for a wide variety of public and private clients, including other railroads, steam locomotive operators, train museums, and other heavy industries. In 2016–17, the shops were enlarged to 30,000 square feet (2,790 m^{2}) to accommodate increasing demand for their services.

Its freight department provides shipping and transloading for local and regional clients. Interchange is with Norfolk Southern at Leaman Place Junction on Amtrak's Keystone Corridor.

When the railroad returned to operation for tourism, freight business was still pursued but was diminished compared to the past. Business from the Homsher feed mill ended in 1976, and one of the only sources of freight traffic was imported plastic pellets for a battery manufacturer in Lampeter. Occasional carloads of lumber were also carried, but freight traffic as a whole came to a near standstill a few years into the 2000s; the plastic pellet business was lost to trucks. Several years went by with no freight shipments at all, and the railroad was in danger of losing its designation as a common carrier entirely. The railroad made a strategic decision to actively seek out new freight business in 2008; at the time, the railroad was averaging less than one freight car per month. Improvements were made to the main line to accommodate the heavier weight of modern freight cars, and the railroad also purchased EMD SW8 #8618 to handle freight duties.

Since 2008, freight carloads have increased substantially, which resulted in the development of a new $1.5 million transloading facility funded by the railroad and matching grants. Increased freight shipments justified an additional locomotive purchase, a rebuilt EMD SW9, in 2019. On February 12, 2023, the railroad inaugurated a six-track freight yard located off of Route U.S. 30, the Lincoln Highway. The United States Department of Labor ordered the railroad in January 2025 to pay back wages and compensatory damages to an employee of the Strasburg Railroad who had unlawfully fired after the employee raised safety concerns.

== Equipment ==
=== Locomotives ===
Locomotive details
Number	Image	Type	Model	Built	Builder	Former owner	Status
1		Gasoline	HL18	1926	Plymouth Locomotive Works	None	Operational
2		Gasoline	JLA	1930	Plymouth Locomotive Works	Unknown	Operational
10		Railcar	Doodlebug	1915	Sanders Machine Shop	Lancaster, Oxford and Southern Railway	Operational
15		Steam	0-6-0ST	1917	H.K. Porter, Inc.	Brooklyn Eastern District Terminal	Stored, awaiting overhaul
89		Steam	2-6-0	1910	Canadian Locomotive Company	Canadian National Railway	Operational
90		Steam	2-10-0	1924	Baldwin Locomotive Works	Great Western Railway of Colorado	Operational
475		Steam	4-8-0	1906	Baldwin Locomotive Works	Norfolk and Western Railway	Operational
972		Steam	4-6-0	1912	Montreal Locomotive Works	Canadian Pacific Railway	Stored, awaiting restoration
1235		Diesel	SW9	1953	Electro-Motive Diesel	Atchison, Topeka and Santa Fe Railway	Under restoration
7312		Steam	0-6-0	1908	Baldwin Locomotive Works	Canadian National Railway	Slowly undergoing a 1,472-day inspection and overhaul
8618		Diesel	SW8	1952	Electro-Motive Diesel	New York Central Railroad	Operational

=== Cagney locomotives ===
Cagney locomotive details
Number	Image	Type	Model	Built	Builder	Former owner	Status
3		Steam	4-4-0	1920	Cagney Bros.	Coney Island	Operational
9		Steam	4-4-0	1903	Cagney Bros.	Coney Island	Stored

=== Former locomotives ===
Locomotive details
Number	Image	Type	Model	Built	Builder	Current owner
21		Railcar	Railbus	1921	Mack	Railroad Museum of Pennsylvania
1187		Steam	0-4-0	1903	Baldwin Locomotive Works	Age of Steam Roundhouse
1223		Steam	4-4-0	1905	Juniata Shops	Railroad Museum of Pennsylvania
7002		Steam	4-4-2	1902	Juniata Shops	Railroad Museum of Pennsylvania
8000		Diesel	Electric	1931	American Locomotives, General Electric Company & Ingersoll Rand	National Museum of Transportation
9331		Diesel	44-ton switcher	1948	General-Electric	Walkersville Southern Railroad (privately owned)

=== Locomotives visited or rebuilt by the shops ===
Number	Image	Type	Model	Built	Builder	Notes
B&O Tom Thumb replica		Steam	2-2-0VB	1926-1927	Baltimore and Ohio Railroad	Rebuild
WDWRR 1/Walter E. Disney		Steam	4-6-0	1925	Baldwin Locomotive Works	Overhauled between 2016 and 2020
WDWRR 2/Lilly Belle		Steam	2-6-0	1928	Baldwin Locomotive Works	Overhauled between 2010 and 2016
WDWRR 3/Roger E. Broggie		Steam	4-6-0	1925	Baldwin Locomotive Works	Overhauled between 2019 and 2023
WDWRR 4/Roy O. Disney		Steam	4-4-0	1916	Baldwin Locomotive Works	Under overhaul since 2024
B&O 25/William Mason		Steam	4-4-0	1856	Mason Machine Works	Rebuild
37		Steam	2-8-2T	1924	American Locomotive Company	Stored at Strasburg between 2010 and 2023
39		Steam	4-6-0	1929	Juniata Shops	Awaiting restoration since 2008
40		Steam	2-8-0	1925	Baldwin Locomotive Works	Rebuilt to operating condition between 1990 and 1991
98		Steam	4-4-0	1909	American Locomotive Company	Stored at Strasburg 1961-1964
611		Steam	4-8-4	1950	Roanoke Shops	Visited Strasburg in 2019 and in 2021-23
614		Steam	4-8-4	1948	Lima Locomotive Works	Owned by RJD America, LLC, with Strasburg contracted for restoration to operating condition
3713		Steam	4-6-2	1934	Lima Locomotive Works	Strasburg contracted for restoration assistance by Steamtown National Historic Site. Undergoing restoration to operation.
764		Diesel	GP7	1954	Electro-Motive Diesel	Leased in 2016
902		Diesel	FP7	1950	Electro-Motive Diesel	Visited Strasburg in 2001
903		Diesel	FP7	1950	Electro-Motive Diesel	Visited Strasburg in 2001

=== Pre-1958 ===
Locomotive details
Number	Image	Type	Model	Built	Builder	Notes
560		Steam	0-4-0	1893	Juniata	Ex-PRR A3 class switcher. Strasburg's last steam locomotive before acquiring the Plymouth.
937		Steam	4-4-0	1876	Juniata	Ex-Pennsylvania Railroad D5 4-4-0 engine. Renumbered as Strasburg's second No. 1 and scrapped in 1924 after it was retired from service.
929	Strasburg Rail Road ex-PRR 4-4-0 number 929 in Strasburg around 1894.	Steam	4-4-0	1873	Juniata	Ex-Pennsylvania Railroad D3 4-4-0 engine. Renumbered as Strasburg's first No. 1. Sold in 1906 after the Plymouth was cheaper to maintain.
"Strasburg"		Steam	4-4-0T	1863	Baldwin Locomotive Works	Strasburg's first new locomotive
"William Penn"		Steam	4-2-0	1835	Long & Norris	Ex-Philadelphia and Columbia Railroad. Strasburg's first locomotive, rumored to be one of the first 50 locomotives built in the US. Possibly rebuilt when sold in 1865.
5203		Combination coach	(B+B)	Unknown	Juniata	Ex-Pennsylvania Railroad combine coach. Rebuilt with an added door to better load and unload milk and supplies at Leaman Place station and the Homsher Mill. Retired in 1929, remained on the property until the 1950s.
5203		Monitor rood combination coach	(B+B)	cir. 1860s	Juniata	Ex-Pennsylvania Railroad 1860s monitor roof combine coach. Used from 1892 to cir. 1926, cut down to a flatcar and remained on the property for 3 more years until dismantled for parts
W-04		Boxcar	(B+B)	1907	Pressed Steel Car Company	Ex-New York, Philadelphia and Norfolk Railroad boxcar. The oldest equipment still surviving from the pre-tourist era, other than Plymouth 20-ton No. 1. Boxcar number SRC #110, NY&PNRR #998, PRR #96451. Used on photo charters like the other equipment.

=== Passenger car equipment ===
Passenger car details
Number	Name	Image	Type	Built	Builder	Notes	Significance of Car Name
10	Reading Railroad		Business car	1913	Harlan and Hollingsworth	ex-Reading Railroad	Original name given to the car by Edward Stotesbury, president of the Reading Railroad. Originally named "Paradise" from 1964 to 2001. Restored to original "Reading" paint scheme.
20	William M. Moedinger		Coach	1913	Jackson and Sharp Company	ex-Maryland and Pennsylvania Railroad	Named for Strasburg Rail Road Company founder and fifth company president (1971–1982). Put into service at Strasburg in 1959. Number 20 is its original MA&PA number. Originally named "Willow Brook" from 1959 until 2007 when it was renamed "William M. Moedinger".
58	Cherry Hill / Huber Leath		Coach	1911	Harlan and Hollingsworth	ex-Reading Railroad	Named for Strasburg Rail Road Company founder and CMO (1962–1986). Arrived at Strasburg in 1958. Originally named "Cherry Hill" from 1958 until 2007 when it was renamed "Huber Leath".
59	Grasshopper Level		Coach	1904	B&M Salem Shops	ex-Boston and Maine Railroad	A nickname for an area of Lancaster County just south of Strasburg along Route 896. Arrived at Strasburg in 1959.
60	Eshleman Run / Donald E.L. Hallock		Combine car	1903	B&M Concorde Shops	ex-Boston and Maine Railroad	Named for SRC founder and 3rd company president (1965–1970). Arrived at Strasburg in 1960. Originally named "Eshelman Run" from 1960 until 1999 when it was renamed "Donald E.L. Hallock".
62	Gobbler's Knob		Coach	1897	Pullman Company	ex-Boston and Maine Railroad	A nickname for an area in Lancaster County just south of Strasburg along Route 896. Put into service in 1962.
65	Walnut Hollow		Coach	1910	Harlan and Hollingsworth	ex-Reading Railroad	Unknown significance. Put into service at Strasburg in 1965.
68	Hello Dolly		Open-Air/Observation car	1896	Pullman Company	ex-Boston and Maine Railroad, built as a coach	Named for the 1969 movie for which this car was rebuilt to star in movie.
70	Cherry Crest		Coach	1904	Pullman Company	ex-Boston and Maine Railroad	Named for the ex-Cornelius Ferree farm along the Strasburg Rail Road line. Put into service at Strasburg in 1970.
71	Daffodil Spring		Open-Air car	1904	Pullman Company	ex-Boston and Maine Railroad, built as a coach	Significance in the name unknown. Put into service at Strasburg in 1971.
72	Mill Creek		Coach	1906	Pullman Company	ex-Boston and Maine Railroad	Named for the tributary of the Conestoga River. Put into service at Strasburg in 1972.
73	Pleasant View		Open-Air car	1907	Pullman Company	ex-Boston and Maine Railroad, built as Coach.	Significance in the name unknown. Put into service at Strasburg in 1973.
75	Henry K. Long		Lounge car	1910	Laconia Car Company	ex-Boston and Maine, built as Coach	Named for Strasburg Rail Road Company founder and first company president (1958–1963). Put into service at Strasburg in 1975.
88	Marian		Parlor car	1910	Laconia Car Company	ex-Boston and Maine Railroad, built as Coach	Named "Marian" for Strasburg Rail Road Company founder and first board secretary. She was the wife of William M. Moedinger. Put into service as the First Class Parlor car at Strasburg in 1988.
92	Susquehanna		Coach	1910	Harlan and Hollingsworth	ex-Reading Railroad	Named "Susquehanna" for the Susquehanna River, which forms the western boundary of Lancaster County. Put into service at Strasburg in 1992.
93	Lee E. Brenner		Dining car	1909	Laconia Car Company	ex-Boston and Maine Railroad, built as Coach, only wooden dining car in regular service in the US	Named for Strasburg Rail Road Company founder and the second company president (1963–1964). Put into service at Strasburg as the dining car in 1993.
96	William McFarlan		Coach	1896	Pullman Company	ex-Boston and Maine Railroad	Named for a former Strasburg Rail Road Company VP whose estate gift funded the restoration. Put into service at Strasburg in 1996.
99	Valley View		Open-Air car	1909	Laconia Car Company	ex-Boston and Maine Railroad, built as Coach	Significance in the name unknown. Put into service at Strasburg in 1999.
105	Warren F. Benner		Coach	1912	Barney and Smith Car Company	ex-Western Maryland	Named for Strasburg Rail Road Company founder and second company treasurer (1967–1998). Put into service at Strasburg in 2005.
118	Linn W. Moedinger		Lounge car	1910	American Car and Foundry	ex-Baltimore and Ohio Railroad	Cocooned from 1990 to 2015. Restored 2015–2018. Completed November 2018. Inaugural run November 19, 2018. Named for Strasburg Rail Road Company CMO (1988–2018), president (2000–2018), and son of William and Marian Moedinger.
3214	None		Baggage car	1909	Laconia Car Company	ex-Boston and Maine, built as Combine	rebuilt in the 70's and used for a photo charter in the 80's. Now used for storage purposes
TBD	TBD		Coach	1899	Wagner Palace Car Company	ex-Rutland Railroad 704	cocooned
TBD	TBD		Cafe/Observation car	1910	Barney and Smith Car Company	ex-Baltimore and Ohio Railroad	cocooned
TBD	TBD		Coach	1899	Jackson and Sharpe Company	ex-Bangor and Aroostook Railroad	cocooned
TBD	TBD		Coach	1899	Jackson and Sharpe Company	ex-Bangor and Aroostook Railroad	cocooned
9125	TBD		Baggage car	1946	American Car and Foundry Company	ex-New York Central Railroad	used for storage
9140	TBD		Baggage car	1946	American Car and Foundry Company	ex-New York Central	used for storage
9146	TBD		Baggage car	1946	American Car and Foundry Company	ex-New York Central Railroad	used for storage

=== Freight equipment ===
Freight equipment details
Number	Image	Type	Built	Builder	Notes
03		Steam Crane	1910	Industrial Works	ex-Pennsylvania Railroad
04		Flatcar	Unknown	Pennsylvania Railroad	ex-Pennsylvania Railroad
05		Tanker car	1906	General American Tank Company	ex-Central Railroad of New Jersey
12		Caboose	1925	Standard Steel Car Company	ex-Detroit, Toledo and Ironton Railroad
66		Snow Plow	1914	Russell Snow Plow Company	ex-Wellsville, Addison and Galeton Railroad
120		Gondola car	1913	American Car and Foundry Company	ex-Pennsylvania Railroad
122		Flatcar	1906	Maryland and Pennsylvania Railroad	ex-Maryland and Pennsylvania Railroad
150		Hopper car	1929	New York Central Railroad	ex-New York Central Railroad
302		Side-dump car	1914	Kilburn and Jacobs	ex-Maryland and Pennsylvania Railroad
713		Boxcar	1903	Baltimore Steel Car and Foundry	ex-Maryland and Pennsylvania Railroad
723		Boxcar	1903	Baltimore Steel Car and Foundry	ex-Maryland and Pennsylvania Railroad
1367		Tanker car	1923	Pennsylvania Railroad	ex-Pennsylvania Railroad
6081		Boxcar	1924	Youngstown Steel Car Company	ex-Rutland Railroad
9194		Boxcar	1924	Youngstown Steel Car Company	ex-Rutland Railroad
25671		RB Insulated Reefer	1931	Unknown	ex-Union Refrigerator Transit Company
40025		Boxcar	1924	American Car and Foundry Company	ex-Central Vermont Railway
96451		Boxcar	1907	Pressed Steel Car Company	ex-New York, Philadelphia and Norfolk Railroad
194796		Hopper car	1916	American Car and Foundry Company	ex-Pennsylvania Railroad
474265		Cast-Steel Flatcar	1934	Unknown	ex-Pennsylvania Railroad
476087		Caboose	1905	Pennsylvania Railroad	ex-Pennsylvania Railroad

== Accidents and incidents ==
- On September 4, 2014, an empty excursion train was being moved from the station when open-air passenger car No. 99 suddenly derailed. There were no passengers on the train as well as no injuries occurred. The derailment was caused by a glitch in one of the track switches by the station. The crew eventually got the passenger car back on track by 3:30 pm.
- On November 2, 2022, while running around a passenger train at Leaman Place, No. 475 collided head-on with an excavator parked on a siding. The impact punched a hole in the smokebox door. No crew or passengers were injured, and the damage done was deemed relatively minor. The collision was broadcast live via Virtual Railfan and was caught on video via cellphone by one of the passengers on board the train that day. The accident was caused by a misaligned switch, and was investigated by the Federal Railroad Administration (FRA). Strasburg announced that repairs on the No. 475 locomotive had commenced on November 3, the day after the accident. Repairs were completed with the No. 475 locomotive returning to service on the 7th.
- On March 27, 2026, a bomb threat was reported at the railroad, and Pennsylvania State Troopers investigated the incident while temporarily condemning the railroad to the public. SRC announced their temporary closure during the incident via their Facebook account.

== Appearances in media ==
The Strasburg Rail Road and its locomotives have appeared in a number of films and television series, including Hello, Dolly!, Thomas and the Magic Railroad, Wild Wild West, The Gilded Age, Daniel Tiger's Neighborhood, The Men Who Built America, and I Heard the Bells.

== Bibliography ==
- Bell, Kurt; Plant, Jeremy (2015). Strasburg Rail Road In Color (1st ed.). Morning Sun Books. ISBN 978-1-58248-479-2.
- Conner, Eric; Barrall, Steve (2017). Strasburg Rail Road. Images of Rail (1st ed.). Arcadia Publishing. ISBN 978-1-4671-2507-9.
- Moedinger, William M. (1993). The Road to Paradise: The Story of the Rebirth of the Strasburg Rail Road (3rd ed.). The Strasburg Rail Road Shop.
- Edson, William D.; Corley, Raymond F. (Autumn 1982). "Locomotives of the Grand Trunk Railway". Railroad History (147). Boston, Mass.: The Railway and Locomotive Historical Society, Inc. ISSN 0090-7847.
- Hallock, Donald E. L (1964). "A brief history of the Strasburg Rail Road". Journal of the Lancaster County Historical Society. 68 (4). Lancaster, PA: Lancaster County Historical Society: 129–146.
