= Matt Feiler =

American football player (born 1992)

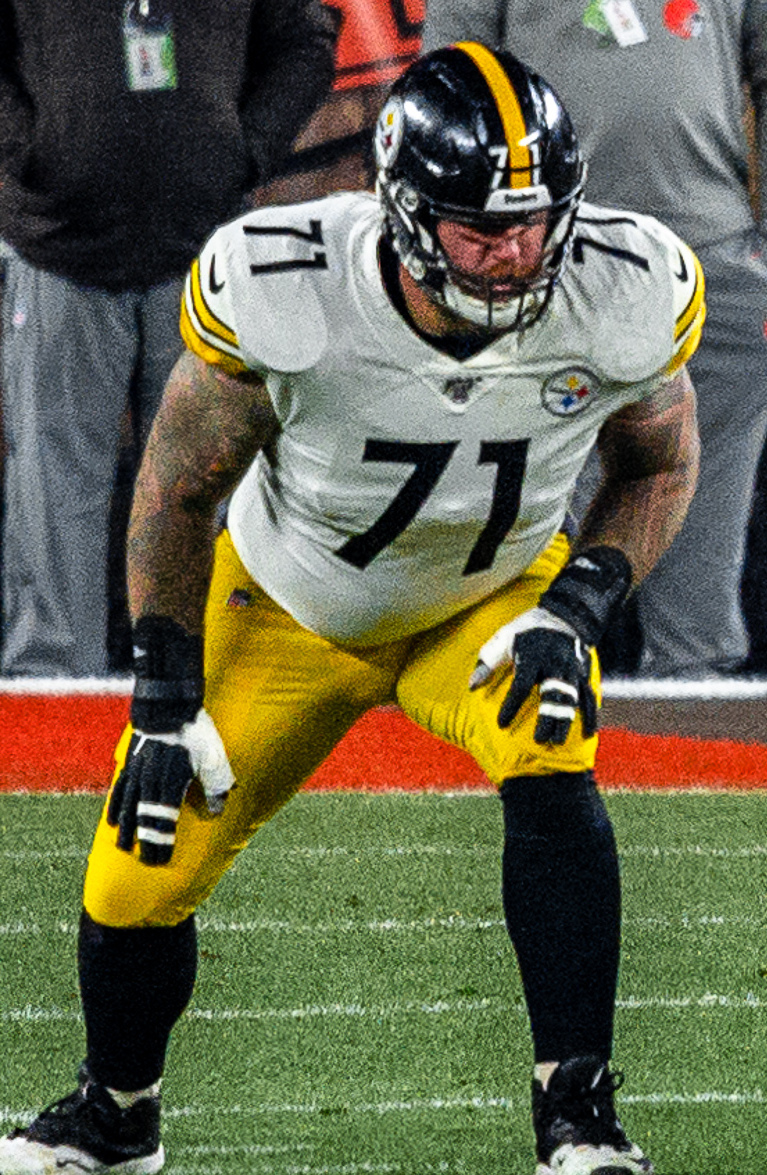
- Feiler with the Pittsburgh Steelers in 2019

Profile
- Position: Guard

Personal information
- Born: July 7, 1992 (age 34); Strasburg, Pennsylvania, U.S.
- Listed height: 6 ft 6 in (1.98 m)
- Listed weight: 330 lb (150 kg)

Career information
- High school: Lampeter-Strasburg (Lampeter, Pennsylvania)
- College: Bloomsburg (2010–2013)
- NFL draft: 2014: undrafted

Career history
- Houston Texans (2014–2015)*; Pittsburgh Steelers (2015–2020); Los Angeles Chargers (2021–2022); Tampa Bay Buccaneers (2023)
- * Offseason or practice squad member only

Career NFL statistics as of 2023
- Games played: 91
- Games started: 79
- Stats at Pro Football Reference

Matt Feiler (born July 7, 1992) is an American former professional football player who was a guard in the National Football League (NFL). He played in the NFL for the Pittsburgh Steelers, Los Angeles Chargers, and Tampa Bay Buccaneers. He also played baseball in high school before deciding to playing college football for the Bloomsburg Huskies.

== Early life ==
Feiler was born in Strasburg, Pennsylvania to parents Mark and Beth Feiler. He attended Lampeter-Strasburg High School where he played defensive tackle and offensive lineman positions with the Pioneers football team. Feiler earned 2nd Team Section 3 All-Star honors. In 2009, during his senior season, Feiler was voted Most Improved Player. Feiler attended the same high school as former Major League Baseball player Jeff Bianchi and musician James Wolpert.

== College career ==
Feiler committed to Bloomsburg University because he received better scholarship opportunities. He began his freshman year in 2010 as an offensive guard and played in 11 games his first season with the Huskies. Before his sophomore season in 2012, he was moved to offensive tackle. Throughout his collegiate career, he started every game and also played in the 2014 East/West Shrine Game.

Feiler has stated his NFL role model was former Bloomsburg and NFL player Jahri Evans.

== Professional career ==
Pre-draft measurables
Height	Weight	Arm length	Hand span	Wingspan	40-yard dash	10-yard split	20-yard split	20-yard shuttle	Three-cone drill	Vertical jump	Broad jump	Bench press
6 ft 5 7/8 in (1.98 m)	330 lb (150 kg)	32 in (0.81 m)	9 1/2 in (0.24 m)	6 ft 5 3/4 in (1.97 m)	5.37 s	1.88 s	3.11 s	4.86 s	8.13 s	26.5 in (0.67 m)	8 ft 7 in (2.62 m)	36 reps
All values from NFL Combine

=== Houston Texans ===
Feiler went undrafted in the 2014 NFL draft, but accepted an invitation to attend rookie minicamp with the Houston Texans on a tryout basis. On May 16, 2014, the Texans signed Feiler to a three-year, $1.54 million contract that includes a signing bonus of $5,000. Throughout training camp, Feiler competed against Tyson Clabo, Anthony Dima, Bryan Witzmann, and Will Yeatman for a roster spot as a backup offensive tackle. On August 30, 2014, the Houston Texans waived Feiler as part of their final roster cuts, but subsequently signed him to their practice squad the following day. On December 31, 2014, the Houston Texans signed Feiler to a two-year, $1.11 million reserve/futures contract that included a signing bonus of $5,000.

During training camp in 2015, Feiler competed for a roster spot as a backup offensive lineman against Bryan Witzmann, Will Yeatman, and Kendall Lamm. On September 4, 2015, he was released by the Texans.

=== Pittsburgh Steelers ===
On September 7, 2015, Feiler was claimed off waivers by the Pittsburgh Steelers and signed to their practice squad. During training camp, Feiler competed for a roster spot as a backup offensive tackle against Ryan Harris and Jerald Hawkins. On September 3, 2016, Feiler was released by the Steelers as part of final roster cuts and was signed to the practice squad the next day. On October 8, 2016, he was promoted to the Steelers' active roster after Harris was placed on injured-reserve. On October 17, 2016, he was released by the Steelers and was re-signed back to the practice squad the next day. He signed a reserve/future contract with the Steelers on January 24, 2017.

He entered training camp in 2017 competing with Jerald Hawkins, Chris Hubbard, Brian Mihalik, Keavon Milton, and Jake Rodgers for a backup offensive tackle position. After losing the backup offensive tackle positions to Hawkins and Hubbard, Feiler was named the backup right guard to David DeCastro to begin the regular season. On September 24, 2017, Feiler made his professional regular season debut as the Steelers lost 23-17 at the Chicago Bears in Week 3. On December 31, 2017, Feiler earned his first career start during a 28-24 victory against the Cleveland Browns in Week 17. He played in five games and started one, his first NFL start, in Week 17 at right guard.

On January 31, 2018, Feiler signed a one-year contract extension with the Steelers, who was due to become an exclusive-rights free agent. Feiler competed against B.J. Finney and Jerald Hawkins to be the primary backup offensive tackle after Chris Hubbard departed in free agency. He was named the primary backup tackle to begin the season. He made his first start of the season in Week 3 at right tackle in place of an injured Marcus Gilbert. He was named the starter at right tackle in Week 8, starting in nine of the final 10 games.

On March 13, 2019, the Steelers traded Marcus Gilbert to the Arizona Cardinals, thereby creating a vacancy at the starting right tackle spot. Due to this turn of events, there was a training camp battle for the position between Feiler, Chukwuma Okorafor, Zach Banner, and Jerald Hawkins, which Feiler ultimately won. Feiler started all 16 games during the 2019 season.

On March 18, 2020, the Steelers placed a second-round restricted free agent tender on Feiler. He signed the tender on June 12, 2020. Feiler transitioned to left guard in 2020, following the retirement of Ramon Foster. He started 13 games before suffering a pectoral injury in Week 14. He was placed on injured reserve on December 14, 2020. He was activated from injured reserve on January 9, 2021.

=== Los Angeles Chargers ===
On March 17, 2021, Feiler signed a three-year, $15 million contract with the Los Angeles Chargers. He was named the starting left guard, and started every game for two seasons.

On March 15, 2023, Feiler was released by the Chargers.

=== Tampa Bay Buccaneers ===
On April 17, 2023, Feiler was signed by the Tampa Bay Buccaneers. He was named the starting left guard to begin the season. He started six games before missing four due to injury, but ultimately lost his starting job to Aaron Stinnie upon his return.

=== Retirement ===
After not being signed to a team during the 2024 and 2025 offseason, Feiler presumably retired from playing professional football and is currently an assistant coach for his high school alma mater, Lampeter-Strasburg High School.

== Personal life ==
Feiler was born in Strasburg, Pennsylvania to Mark and Beth Feiler. He attended Lampeter-Strasburg High School and played defensive tackle and offensive lineman throughout high school. He graduated in 2014 with a degree in history from Bloomsburg University.

Feiler married Julie Carpenter of Bloomsburg, PA on March 17, 2018.

In his leisure time, Feiler enjoys watching baseball. In college, he followed coverage of the Winter and Summer Olympic Games. He prefers water over Gatorade. Feiler has also stated his favorite cereal is Lucky Charms.
