= Weber–Weaver Farm =

- U.S. National Register of Historic Places
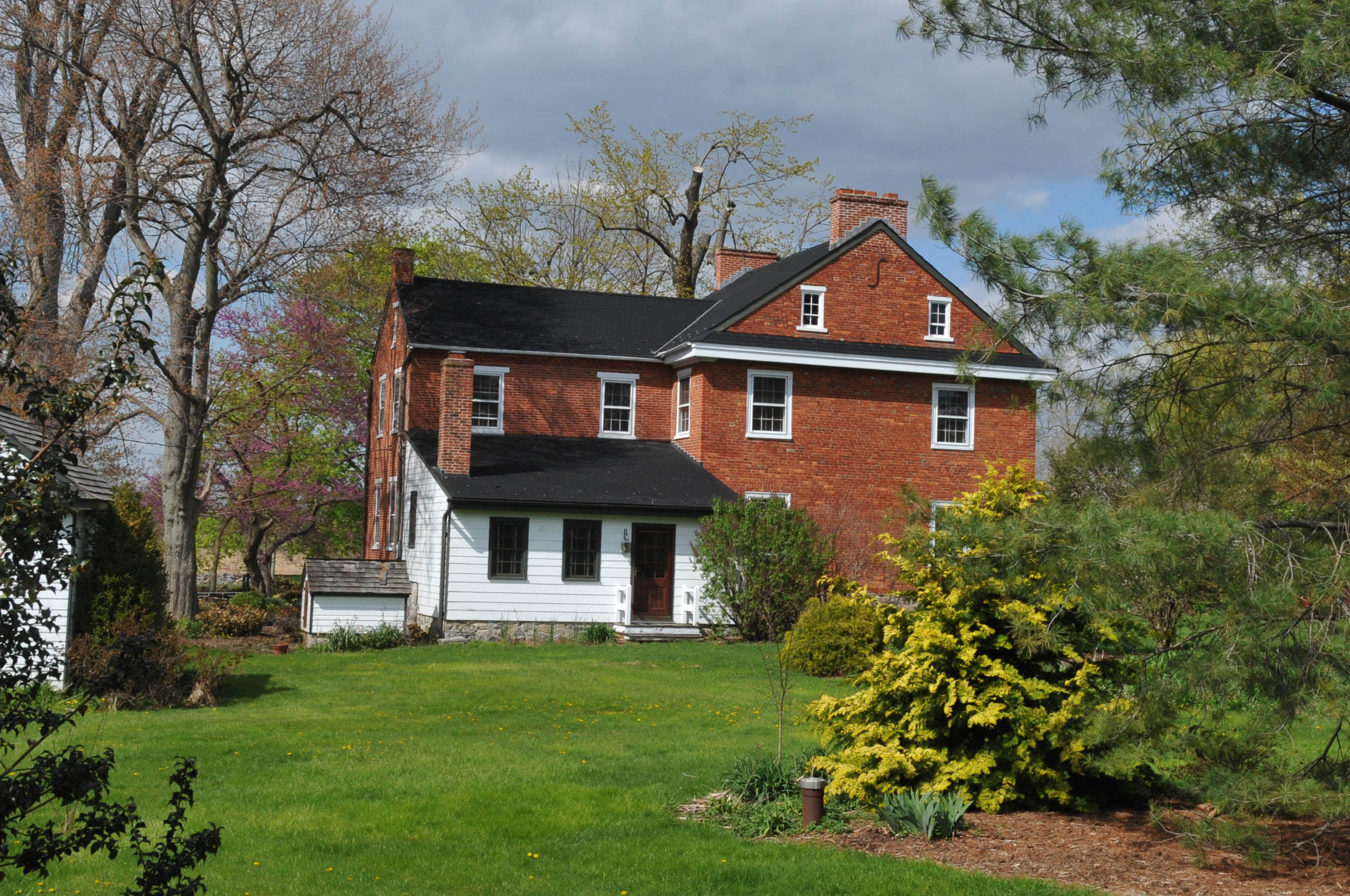

- Location within Pennsylvania Location within the United States
- Location: 1835 Pioneer Rd., West Lampeter Township, Pennsylvania
- Coordinates: 40°00′14″N 76°13′59″W
- Area: 73.3 acres (29.7 ha)
- Built: 1724
- Built by: John Weaver
- Architectural style: Georgian, Pennsylvania German
- MPS: Lancaster County MPS
- NRHP reference No.: 99000646
- Added to NRHP: May 27, 1999

The Weber–Weaver Farm is an historic home and farm complex that is located in West Lampeter Township, Lancaster County, Pennsylvania, United States.

It was listed on the National Register of Historic Places in 1999.

== History and architectural features ==
This historic property includes the Hans Weber House (1724), the Weber summer kitchen (c. 1800), the Weber barn (c. 1724), the John Weaver House and summer kitchen (c. 1765), the Weaver barn (c. 1904), the Weaver shed (c. 1904), and the Weaver garage (1930). The Hans Weber House is a stone dwelling that was modeled on the Hans Herr House in its Germanic style. It measures thirty-six feet by thirty-four feet and was enlarged to a full two-stories and renovated between 1790 and 1810. The John Weaver House was built as a two-story, Georgian-style dwelling, subsequently enlarged, and modified again during the nineteenth and twentieth centuries.
