= Matthew Wright (American football) =

American football player (born 1996)

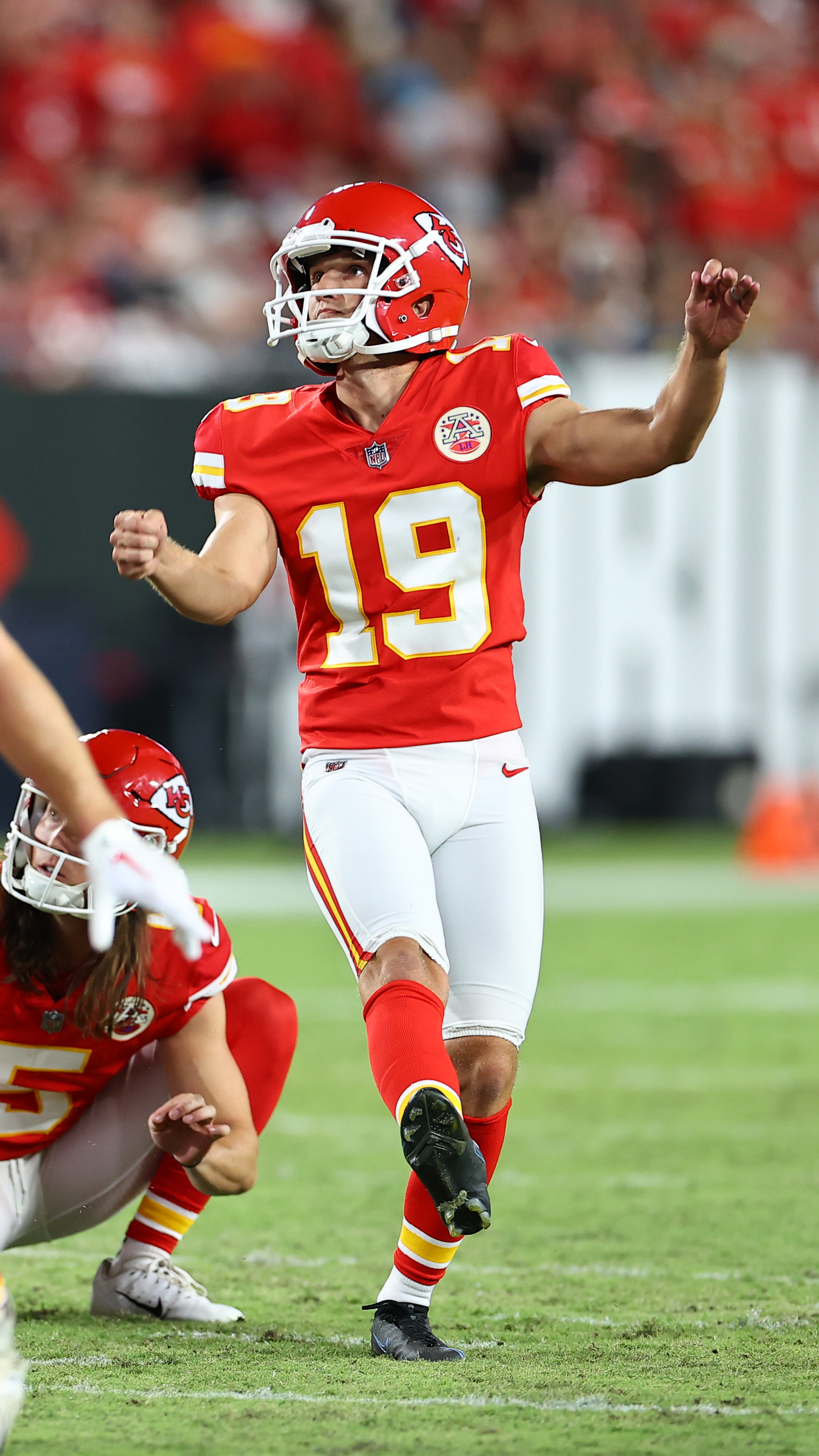
- Wright with the Kansas City Chiefs in 2022

Profile
- Position: Kicker

Personal information
- Born: March 22, 1996 (age 30); Lancaster, Pennsylvania, U.S.
- Listed height: 5 ft 11 in (1.80 m)
- Listed weight: 174 lb (79 kg)

Career information
- High school: Lampeter-Strasburg (Lampeter, Pennsylvania)
- College: UCF (2014–2018)
- NFL draft: 2019: undrafted

Career history
- Pittsburgh Steelers (2019)*; Tampa Bay Vipers (2020)*; Pittsburgh Steelers (2020); Detroit Lions (2021)*; Jacksonville Jaguars (2021); Kansas City Chiefs (2022); Pittsburgh Steelers (2022); Kansas City Chiefs (2022); Carolina Panthers (2023)*; San Francisco 49ers (2023)*; Atlanta Falcons (2023)*; New England Patriots (2023)*; Carolina Panthers (2023); Pittsburgh Steelers (2024)*; San Francisco 49ers (2024); Kansas City Chiefs (2024); Tennessee Titans (2024); Carolina Panthers (2025)*; Tennessee Titans (2025); Washington Commanders (2025); Houston Texans (2025); Buffalo Bills (2025)*
- * Offseason or practice squad member only

Awards and highlights
- Colley Matrix national champion (2017); 2× second-team All-AAC (2017, 2018)

Career NFL statistics as of 2025
- Field goals made: 60
- Field goal attempts: 68
- Field goal %: 88.2%
- Longest field goal: 59
- Stats at Pro Football Reference

Matthew Wright (born March 22, 1996) is an American professional football placekicker. Wright played college football for the UCF Knights where he was a member of the undefeated 2017 team that was selected as national champions by the Colley Matrix. Wright signed with the Pittsburgh Steelers as an undrafted free agent in 2019. In 2020, he signed with the Tampa Bay Vipers of the XFL before being released and being resigned by the Steelers. He has since been a member of 11 other NFL teams.

== Early life ==
Wright attended Lampeter-Strasburg High School in Lampeter, Pennsylvania. As the placekicker on Lampeter-Strasburg's football team, he finished his high school kicking career making 15 of 18 attempted kicks, including 9 of 11 as a senior, with a high school career-long of 42 yards. Wright also converted 122 of 126 extra point kicks in his high school career. He was named to the Pennsylvania Football News Class AAA First-team and a Section Two First-team All-Star (as a punter and placekicker). Coming out of high school, Wright was a three-star college kicking prospect and the #46 kicker nationally as ranked by ESPN.

Wright also played high school soccer, earning Lancaster Newspaper's Fall All-Star honors.

== College career ==
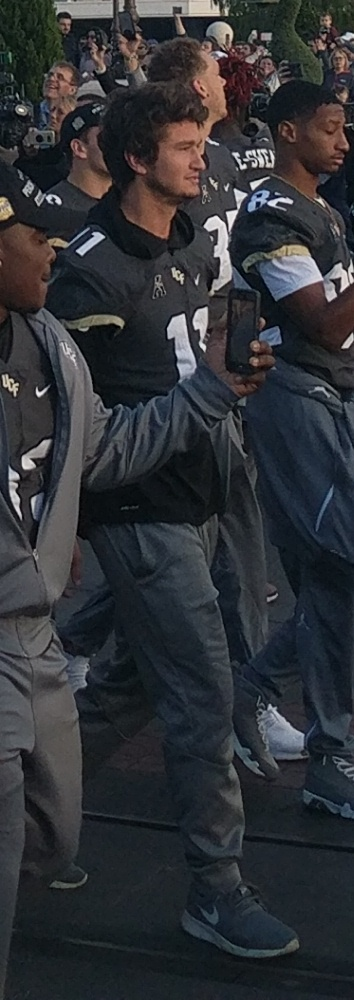
Wright, wearing his 11 jersey, walking in the 2018 UCF Parade at the Magic Kingdom, following their Peach Bowl & National Championship season

Wright holds the UCF Knights Football records for most career points (375), most field goals made (55), most extra points (PATs), (212, including 153 consecutive made PATs), tied for the best career kicking percentage (.774), and second-best career PAT percentage (.985).

Wright was redshirted his true freshman season before going on to be the Knights primary placekicker for the next four seasons.

In 2014, as a true freshman, Wright earned American Athletic Conference (AAC) All-Academic Team honors.

In 2015, as a redshirt freshman, Wright made 13 of 17 field goal attempts (.765) with a long of 48 yards while recording one tackle.

In 2016, as a redshirt sophomore, Wright became one of just 11 Knights ever to make a 50-yard field goal attempt. Making 17 of 22 field goal attempts (.772) (50-yard long) during the 2016 season, Wright's .773 kicking percentage placed seventh all-time in UCF football history for single season kick percentage. Wright was named to the 2016-17 American All-Academic Team.

Entering his redshirt junior season in 2017, Wright was named to the Lou Groza Award preseason watch list (best placekicker in college football). He also handled kickoff specialist duties during the season. Following Wright's performance against the Memphis, Wright was named the American Special Teams Player of the Week. In the Knights' game versus Austin Peay, he set the UCF single-game extra points record (10). On January 1, 2018, Wright made two field goals against the Auburn in the Peach Bowl as the Knights finished their season 13-0. After the victory, the school announced they would claim a National Championship despite not making the College Football Playoff and never being ranked higher than 10th. Wright finished the 2017 season making 13 of 18 field goal attempts (.722) with a long of 47 yards. With his 2017 season performance, Wright set the UCF Knights single-season record for most kicking points scored (119), the second-most points scored in a season, and the most extra points in a season (80). Wright earned Second-team All-AAC honors.

In 2018, Wright again served as both UCF's placekicker and kickoff specialist. In back-to-back weeks following the Knights' games against Memphis and East Carolina University, Wright was named the AAC Special Teams Player of the Week. Wright finished the season converting 12 of 14 field goal attempts (.857) with a long of 46 yards. In successfully converting all 74 PATs, Wright became only the eighth player in UCF program history to make every PAT in a season. Wright ended the season with a 58.3-yard kickoff average, including 29 touchbacks, with two tackles and a fumble recovery. Wright earned AAC Second-team honors for his 2018 senior kicking efforts.

Wright also earned the University of Central Florida's most prestigious honor, the Order of the Pegasus Award, for exemplary performance in "academic achievement, outstanding university involvement, leadership, and community service." After graduating, Wright signed with GatNation, LLC who represented him as sports agents from March 2019 through July 2023.

== Professional career ==
Pre-draft measurables
Height	Weight	Arm length	Hand span
5 ft 11 1/4 in (1.81 m)	174 lb (79 kg)	29 1/8 in (0.74 m)	9 1/2 in (0.24 m)
All values from UCF's Pro Day

=== Pittsburgh Steelers (first stint) ===
Wright was signed by the Pittsburgh Steelers as an undrafted free agent following the 2019 NFL draft. He was waived on August 31, 2019, during final roster cuts.

=== Tampa Bay Vipers ===
On October 16, 2019, Wright was selected by the Tampa Bay Vipers of the XFL in Phase 5 of the 2020 XFL draft. On January 22, 2020, he was released during training camp.

=== Pittsburgh Steelers (second stint) ===
On November 30, 2020, Wright was re-signed by the Steelers to their practice squad. He was elevated to the active roster on December 7, December 26, and January 2, 2021, for the team's Weeks 13, 16, and 17 games against the Washington Football Team, Indianapolis Colts, and Cleveland Browns, and reverted to the practice squad after each game. Wright was two-of-two on extra points against Washington, and made his first career field goal from 37 yards out. Wright finished the season having made all four of his field goal attempts, including a long of 46 yards, and all seven extra point attempts.

On January 18, 2021, following the season, Wright's practice squad contract with the team expired.

=== Detroit Lions ===
On January 22, 2021, the Detroit Lions signed Wright to a reserve/futures contract.

=== Jacksonville Jaguars ===
On September 27, 2021, Wright was signed to the Jacksonville Jaguars' practice squad. On October 16, he was promoted to the active roster. On October 10, Wright got his first start in the Jaguars' Week 5 matchup against the Tennessee Titans. He went 0-for-1, missing a 53-yard field goal and 1-for-2 on extra points. On October 17, in an NFL International Series game played in London, England against the Miami Dolphins, Wright went 3-for-3 on field goals, including a career-long 54-yard field goal and a game-winning 53-yard field goal that snapped the Jaguars' 20-game losing streak and gave them their first win since September 13, 2020. For his performance, Wright was awarded AFC Special Teams Player Of The Week. On October 19, he was named the starter going forward as Jacksonville cut former starter, Josh Lambo, from their roster.

On May 11, 2022, Wright was waived by the Jaguars.

=== Kansas City Chiefs (first stint) ===
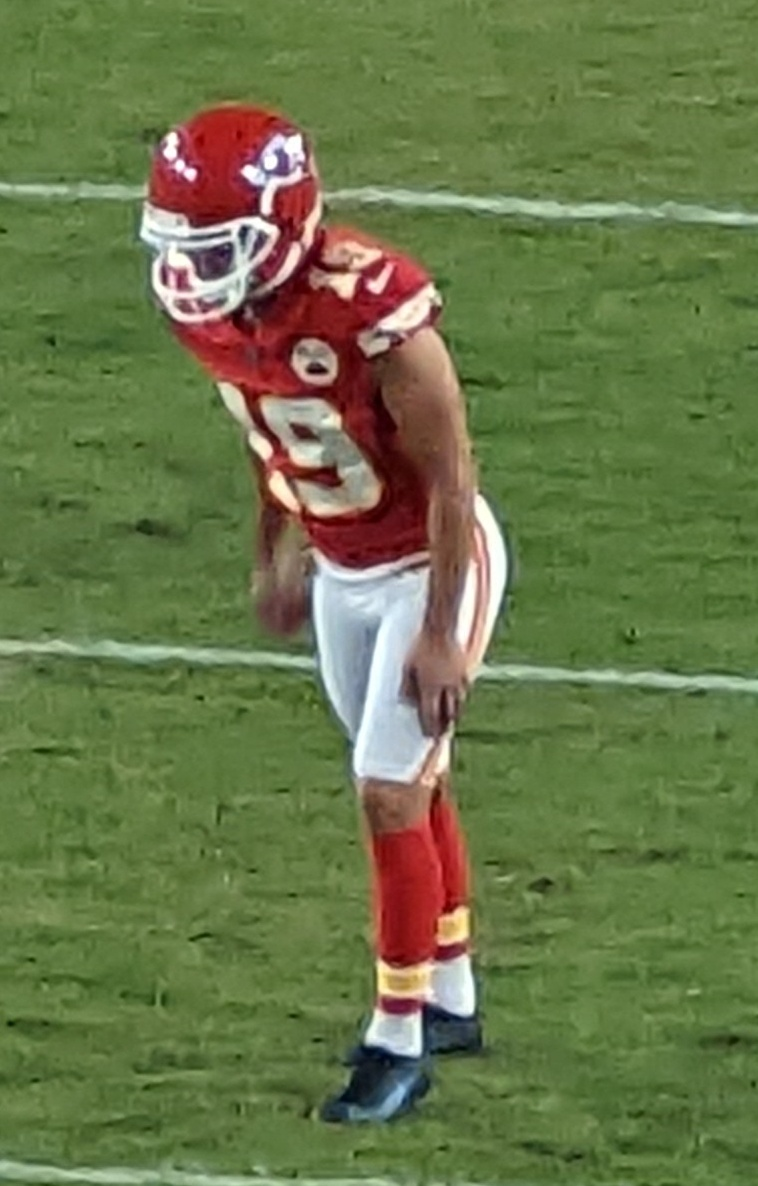
Wright in 2022

Wright was signed to the Kansas City Chiefs' practice squad on September 27, 2022. He was elevated to the active roster on October 1, and then reverted back to the practice squad after the game. Wright was elevated again on October 10. In the Week 5 matchup against the Las Vegas Raiders, he broke what was at the time the Chiefs' franchise record for longest field goal with a 59-yard field goal.

=== Pittsburgh Steelers (third stint) ===
On November 9, 2022, Wright was signed by the Steelers off the Chiefs practice squad. He was released on December 10.

=== Kansas City Chiefs (second stint) ===
Wright was signed to the Chiefs practice squad on January 6, 2023. That same day, he was elevated to the active roster via a standard elevation. However, Wright did not play and was inactive for the Chiefs' Week 18 matchup against the Raiders. He was released on January 30.

=== Carolina Panthers (first stint) ===
On August 8, 2023, Wright signed with the Carolina Panthers. He was waived on August 26.

=== San Francisco 49ers (first stint) ===
On September 4, 2023, Wright was signed to the San Francisco 49ers' practice squad, but was released five days later.

=== Atlanta Falcons ===
On November 23, 2023, Wright was signed to the Atlanta Falcons' practice squad. He was released five days later.

=== New England Patriots ===
On November 30, 2023, Wright was signed to the New England Patriots' practice squad. He was released by New England on December 8.

=== Carolina Panthers (second stint) ===
On January 2, 2024, Wright was signed to the Panthers practice squad. Wright was elevated to the active roster for Week 18, missing one 52 yard field goal attempt, his only attempt of the day, against the Tampa Bay Buccaneers before returning to the practice squad. Wright was not signed to a reserve/future contract and thus became a free agent at the end of the season upon the expiration of his practice squad contract.

=== Pittsburgh Steelers (fourth stint) ===
On April 10, 2024, Wright signed with the Steelers. He was waived on August 26.

=== San Francisco 49ers (second stint) ===
On October 8, 2024, Wright signed with the 49ers following an injury to starting 49ers kicker Jake Moody. On October 19, Wright was placed on injured reserve after injuring his shoulder and back in a Week 6 matchup against the Seahawks. Wright was released on November 15.

=== Kansas City Chiefs (third stint) ===
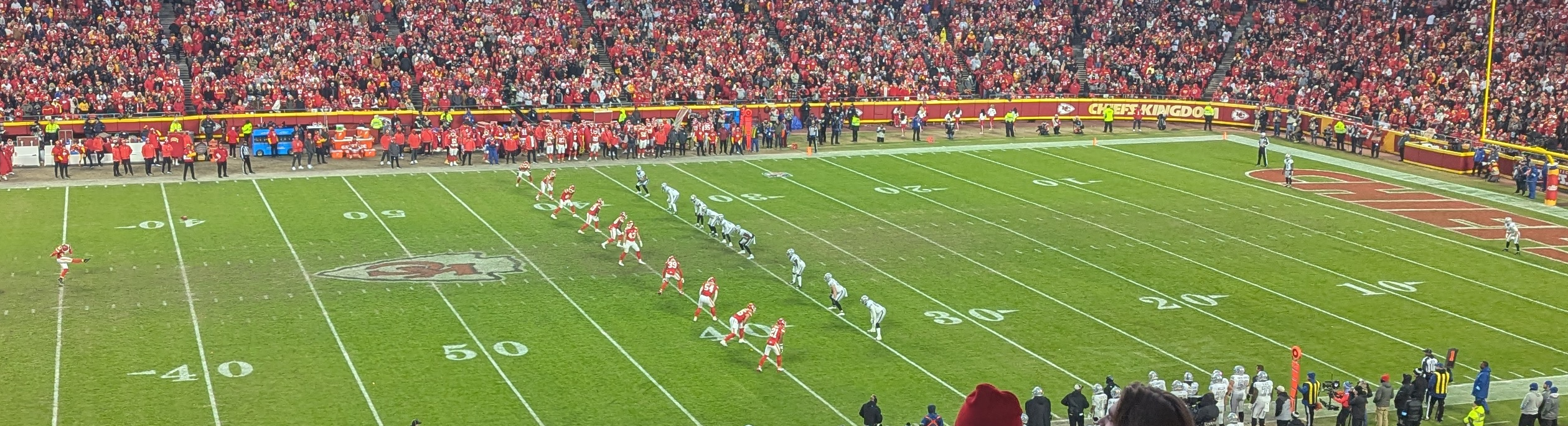
Wright (left), with the Chiefs, kicks off to the Las Vegas Raiders on November 29, 2024, under the 2024 kickoff rules

On November 26, 2024, Wright was signed to the Chiefs' practice squad following an injury to Spencer Shrader. He was signed to the active roster on December 4. Wright booted 4 field goals in a 19-17 victory in his first game back with the Chiefs. In his second game back, he went 4-for-4 on field goals, including the game-winner as time expired against the Los Angeles Chargers, helping the Chiefs clinch the AFC West. The game-winning 31-yard field goal hit the left upright before going in, prompting many to dub it "A Doink for the Division." Wright earned his second AFC Special Teams Player of the Week award for his performance. Wright was released on December 14 after Harrison Butker returned in Week 15, when the Chiefs faced the Cleveland Browns.

=== Tennessee Titans (first stint) ===
On December 26, 2024, Wright was signed to the Tennessee Titans' practice squad following an injury to Nick Folk, and promoted to the active roster two days later. After making all three of his kicks in Week 17, he was waived on December 30. However, Wright was added back to the Titans' practice squad on January 1, 2025. He was elevated for the season closer and made both of his field goals once again.

=== Carolina Panthers (third stint) ===
On February 11, 2025, Wright signed a reserve/futures contract with the Panthers. He was released on August 25.

=== Tennessee Titans (second stint) ===
On October 8, 2025, Wright signed with the Tennessee Titans' practice squad. He was released by the Titans following the signing of Joe Bachie on October 17.

=== Washington Commanders ===
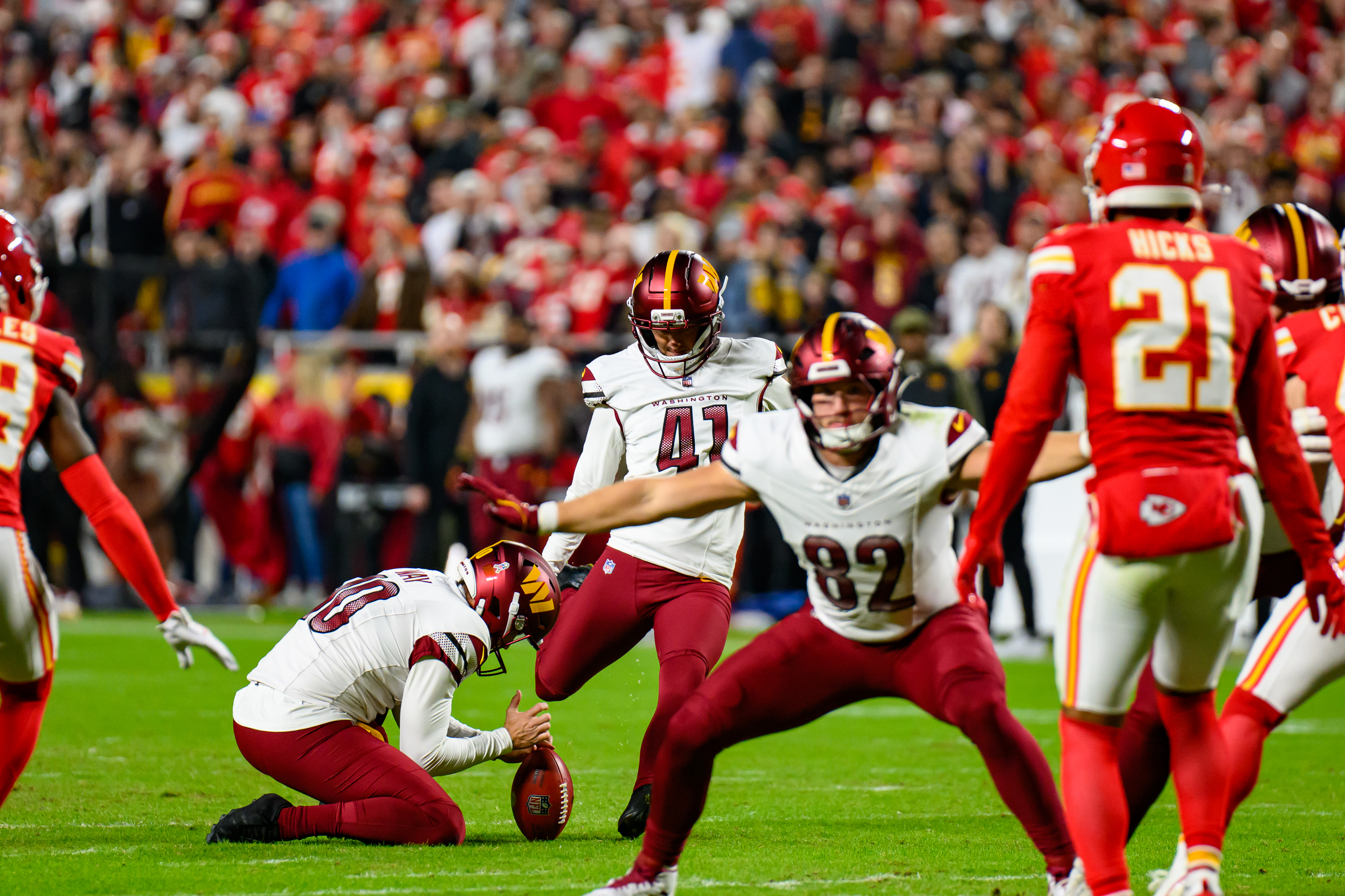
Wright converting his only kick for the Washington Commanders on October 27, 2025 at Arrowhead Stadium

On October 27, 2025, Wright signed with the Washington Commanders' practice squad, and was elevated to active roster the same day for a game against the Kansas City Chiefs amid an injury to Matt Gay. In the game, he converted his only kick, an extra point attempt. Wright was released by the Commanders the following day.

=== Houston Texans ===
On November 5, 2025, Wright signed with the Houston Texans' practice squad; he was later promoted to the active roster on November 8. On November 19, Wright was waived by the Texans.

=== Buffalo Bills ===
On January 6, 2026, Wright signed with the Buffalo Bills' practice squad.

== Career statistics ==
=== NFL ===
Year	Team	GP	Overall FGs					PATs				Kickoffs		Points
Year	Team	GP	Blk	Lng	FGA	FGM	Pct	XPA	XPM	Pct	Blk	KO	TB	Points
2020	PIT	3	0	46	4	4	100.0	7	7	100.0	0	15	1	19
2021	JAX	14	0	56	24	21	87.5	15	13	86.6	0	31	5	76
2022	KC	2	0	59	4	3	75.0	8	8	100.0	0	13	10	17
2022	PIT	4	0	52	14	12	85.7	7	7	100.0	0	23	5	43
2023	CAR	1	0	0	1	0	0.0	0	0	0.0	0	1	1	0
2024	SF	1	0	41	3	3	100.0	3	3	100.0	0	8	1	12
2024	KC	2	0	50	9	8	88.9	2	2	100.0	0	6	1	26
2024	TEN	2	0	39	4	4	100.0	1	1	100.0	0	7	1	13
2025	TEN	1	0	46	1	1	100.0	3	3	100.0	0	10	0	6
2025	WAS	1	0	-	0	0	-	1	1	100.0	0	2	0	1
2025	HOU	2	0	43	4	4	100.0	2	2	100.0	0	10	0	4
Total		33	0	60	68	60	88.2	47	45	95.7	0	118	26	225

=== College ===
Year	G	Kicking						
Year	G	XPM	XPA	XP%	FGM	FGA	FG%	Pts
2015	12	17	17	100.0	13	17	76.5	56
2016	13	39	41	95.1	17	22	77.3	90
2017	13	80	81	98.8	13	18	72.2	119
2018	13	74	74	100.0	12	14	85.7	110
Career	51	210	213	98.6	55	71	77.5	375

== Personal life ==
As a senior at UCF, Wright worked as an aerospace engineering intern at Lockheed Martin. Following his graduation from UCF in December 2018, Lockheed Martin offered Wright a full-time job with the company, which Wright accepted and worked until September 2021.
