= Lampeter-Strasburg School District =

School district in Pennsylvania, United States

Location
- Lancaster County; Pennsylvania United States

District information
- Type: Public
- Grades: K-12
- Superintendent: Kevin Peart
- Asst. superintendent(s): Dr. Andrew Godfrey
- Budget: $51,034,770

Students and staff
- Students: 3,008
- District mascot: Pioneer

Other information
- Website: l-spioneers.org

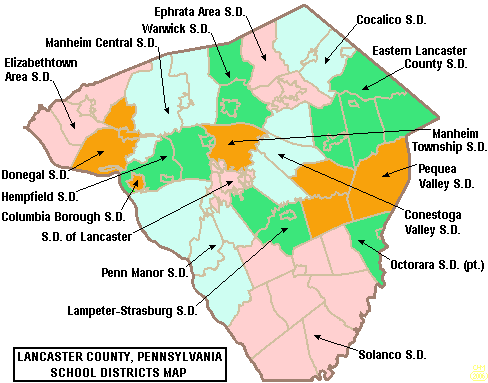
Map of Lancaster County public school districts. Lampeter-Strasburg School District is in green in the center of the county.

The Lampeter-Strasburg School District is a school district in rural and suburban Lancaster County, Pennsylvania, United States. It serves the borough of Strasburg, as well as Strasburg and West Lampeter Townships. The census-designated place of Willow Street is mostly in the district. The district operates four schools on its campus, serves approximately 3,000 attending students, and is overseen by its nine-member school board led by president Melissa Herr.

== Schools ==
The Lampeter-Strasburg School District includes Lampeter-Strasburg High School, Martin Meylin Middle School, Hans Herr Elementary School, and Lampeter Elementary School. All four buildings are on the district's campus in West Lampeter Township. Previously, the district operated Willow Street Elementary School and Strasburg Elementary School, which closed in 2008 and 2013 respectively.

== Athletics ==
Lampeter-Strasburg baseball has been among its strongest programs. 2005 graduate Jeff Bianchi was selected in the second round of the 2005 Major League Baseball draft after Lampeter-Strasburg won the Pennsylvania state title in baseball.
