= Lampeter-Strasburg High School =

Coordinates: 39.9927°N 76.2324°W

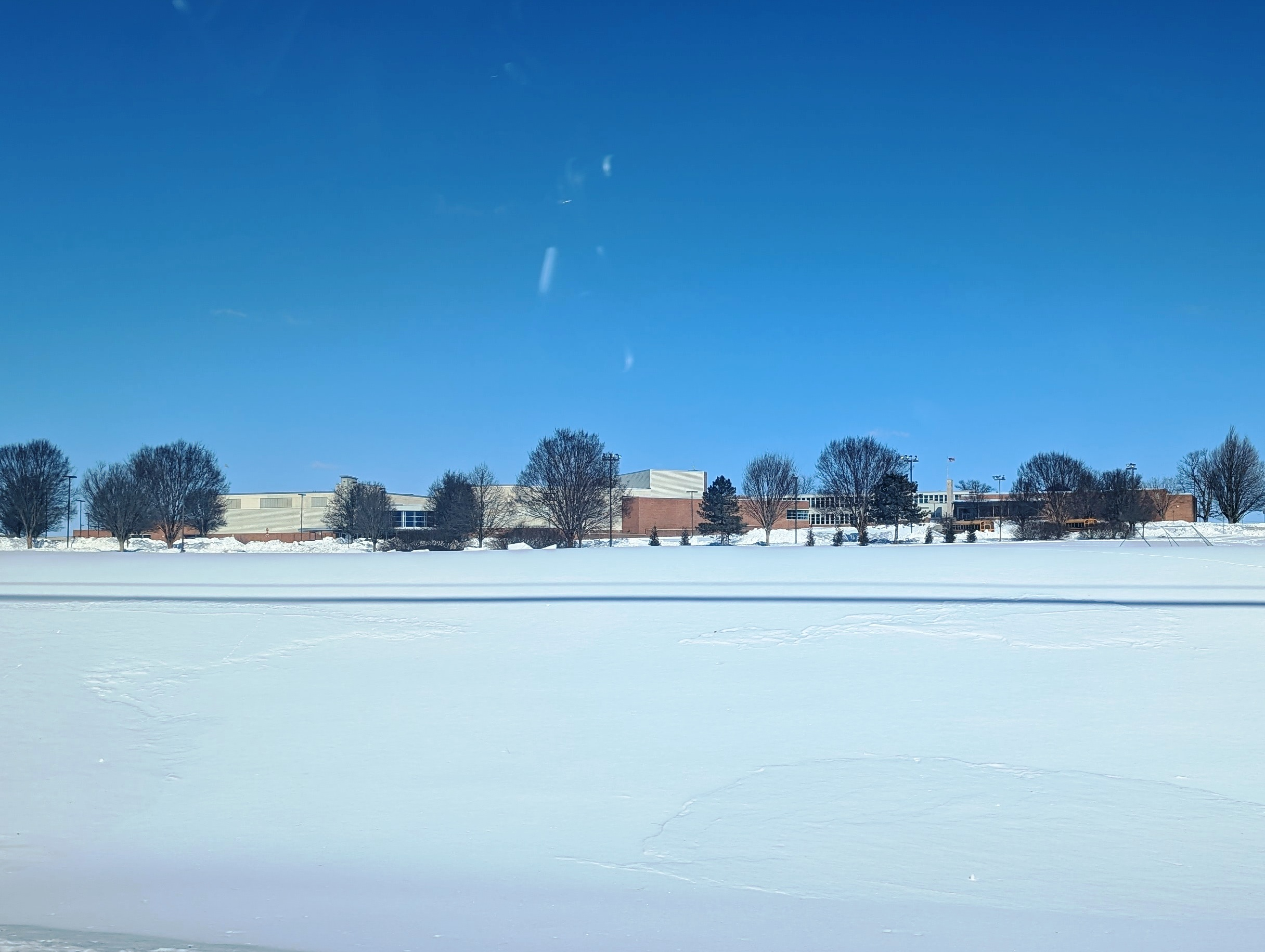

Location
- 1600 Book Rd; Lampeter, Pennsylvania 17537; United States

Information
- School type: Public, secondary
- School district: Lampeter-Strasburg School District
- Superintendent: Kevin Peart
- Principal: Benjamin Feeney
- Staff: 60.90 (FTE)
- Grades: Ninth–twelfth grades
- Enrollment: 914 (2023-2024)
- Student to teacher ratio: 15.01
- Campus: Rural
- Colors: Blue and white
- Mascot: Pioneer
- Website: Lampeter-Strasburg HS

Lampeter-Strasburg High School is a public secondary school in the Lampeter-Strasburg School District, located in Lampeter, Pennsylvania, United States.

== Education ==
=== Languages ===
L-S High School offers German and Spanish. Each course includes different degrees of the language, such as Spanish-1, 2, 3, and 4, or Spanish First Degree. Chinese was previously offered but discontinued starting the 2024-2025 school year.

== Sports ==
Lampeter-Strasburg sponsors boys' and girls' soccer, boys' and girls' tennis, girls' volleyball, football, golf, boys' and girls' basketball, wrestling, bowling, baseball, softball, swimming, boys' and girls' track and field, boys' and girls' cross country, field hockey, and boys' and girls' lacrosse.

== Girls' basketball ==
The L-S girls' basketball team made it to the 2009 state finals, where they were defeated by a tough Archbishop Carroll team that had four Division 1 recruits. In 2013, the girls' basketball team won the Lancaster Lebanon League Section 3 title and made it to the Lancaster Lebanon League title game, but fell to Lancaster Catholic High School, the previous year's state finals runner-up.

== Baseball and softball ==
The baseball team has won 23 Lancaster Lebanon League section championships, 3 league championships (1982,1984,2019), 2 district 3 championships (1994,2012), and 2 state championships (1994, 2005). They were state runners up in 1995,2012, and 2019. They are currently coached by Jeffery Swarr.

The softball team has won 8 section titles, including 5 straight between 2014 and 2019. They've won the league championship 5 times, and the district championship twice. They have won 2 state championships (2018,2021) and were the runners-up in 2016 and 2019. they are currently coached by Gene Charles.

== Marching band ==
In 1998 and 1999, the L-S marching band won the US Cavalcade of Bands (CBA) Yankee class Open division.

In 2010, the marching band won the US Scholastic Band Association (USSBA) Pennsylvania State Band Championship Competition at Hershey Park Stadium with their show "Arabian Nights".

In 2012, the Pioneer Marching Band received second place out of four bands, winning high auxiliary, high percussion, high visual effect, and high overall effect at the US Bands Championship in West Chester. A week later, they won sixth place out of 15 at the Cavalcade State Championships at Hersheypark Stadium in Hershey.

As of the 2014 season, the L-S marching band no longer competes. They are now part of the Pennsylvania Marching Band Coalition.

== Indoor Color Guard ==
In 2012 the L-S Indoor Color Guard competed in:

- WGI (World Guard International) - Scholastic A Guard
- TIA (Tournament of Bands Indoor Association) - Scholastic A Guard
- CIDA (Cavalcade Indoor Drill Association) - Scholastic A Guard
- USBANDS - AAA Class

== Bowling Team ==
- 2024-25 Section Four Champions
- 2023-24 Section Three Champions
- 2022-23 Section Three Champions
- 2007-08 Section Three Champions

== Notable alumni ==
- Jeff Bianchi (2005), retired professional baseball player and current hitting coach for the Lancaster Barnstormers
- Deborah Birx, M.D., White House Coronavirus Response Coordinator
- Chloe Cherry (2015), adult film actress best known for her role as Faye in the HBO show Euphoria
- Matt Feiler (2010), former professional football player. Most notably with the Pittsburgh Steelers (2015-2020)
- James Wolpert (2009), singer, best known for his appearance on Season 5 of the NBC singing competition The Voice
- Matthew Wright (2014), professional football player currently a free agent; Jacksonville Jaguars (2021).
- Steve Rizzo (1985), Stuntman and Actor
