= Hans Herr =

Swiss-American Mennonite bishop (1639–1725)

- Bishop of the Mennonites
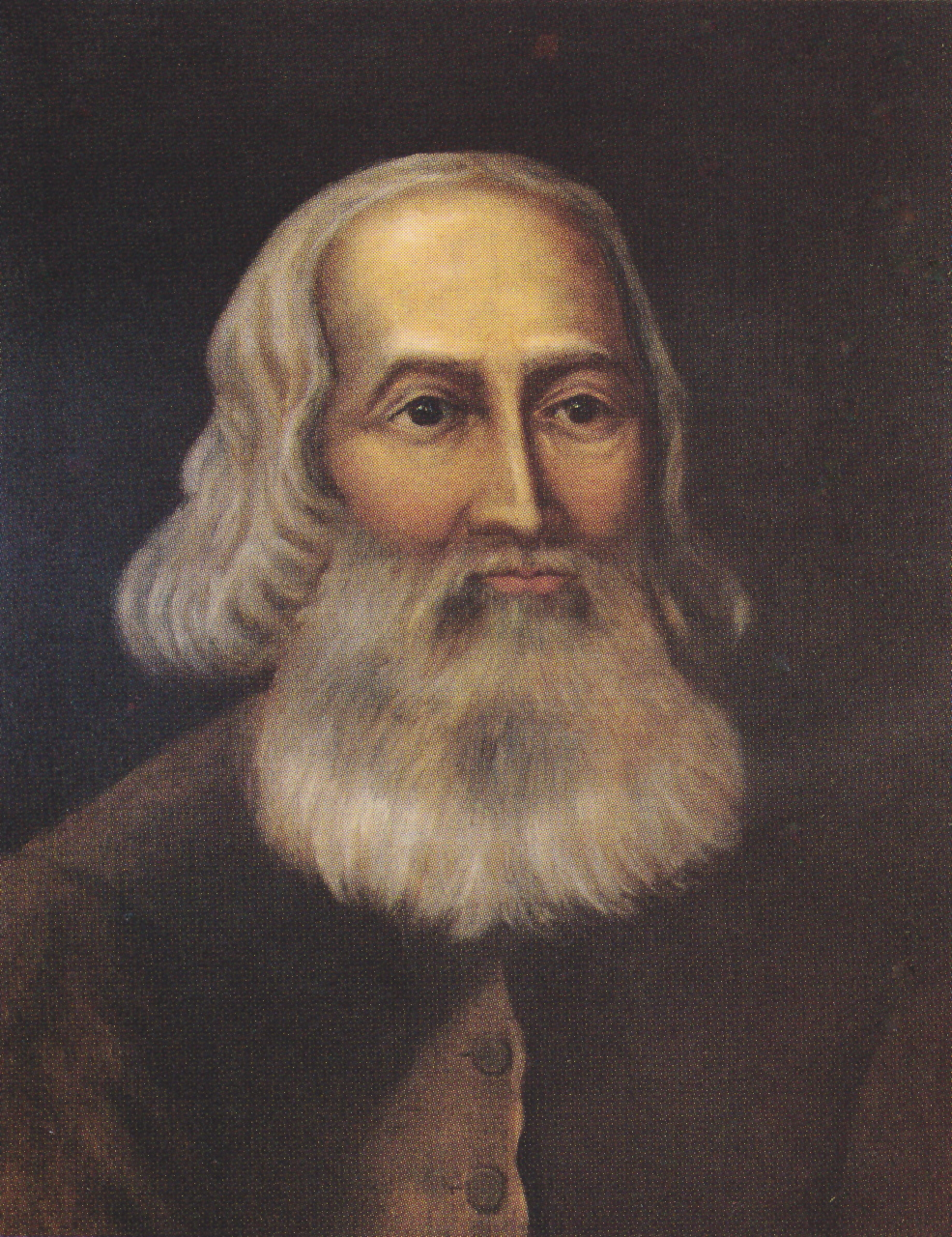

Personal details
- Born: Hans Prefiot; September 17, 1639 Zürich, Switzerland
- Died: October 11, 1725 (aged 86) West Lampeter Township, Province of Pennsylvania
- Denomination: Swiss Brethren/Mennonite
- Parents: Hans Christian Herr and Catherine Haas
- Spouse: Elizabeth M. Kendig
- Children: Abraham Herr, Margaretha Herr, Samuel Mylon Herr, Henry Herr, Isaac Mylon Herr, Maria Herr, Verona Meister Herr, Christian Herr, Anna Herr, Emanuel Herr

Hans Herr (September 17, 1639 – October 11, 1725) was a Swiss-American Mennonite bishop. He was born in Zürich, Switzerland. In 1710, Herr was among a group of settlers who purchased 10,000 acres (40 km^{2}) of land along Pequea Creek in what is now Lancaster County, Pennsylvania. He died in West Lampeter Township, in the then Province of Pennsylvania.

Herr's son Christian Herr built the Hans Herr House in 1719. Located in Willow Street, Pennsylvania, the house is open to the public as a museum.

== Biography ==
Hans Herr was born on September 17, 1639, in Zürich, Switzerland. He became a member of the Swiss Brethren and served as a bishop.

In 1710, Herr was among a group of settlers who purchased 10,000 acres (40 km^{2}) of land on the south side of Pequea Creek in what is now Lancaster County. A warrant for the land was issued on October 10, 1710, and it was surveyed on October 23.

Herr died in West Lampeter Township on October 11, 1725.

== House and museum ==
The Hans Herr House

The Hans Herr House, built by his son Christian Herr in 1719, is open to the public as a museum, and is the oldest Pennsylvania German settlement still in existence today. The house is located at 1849 Hans Herr Drive in Willow Street, Pennsylvania.
