= Park Site (36LA96) =

- Park Site 36La96
- U.S. National Register of Historic Places
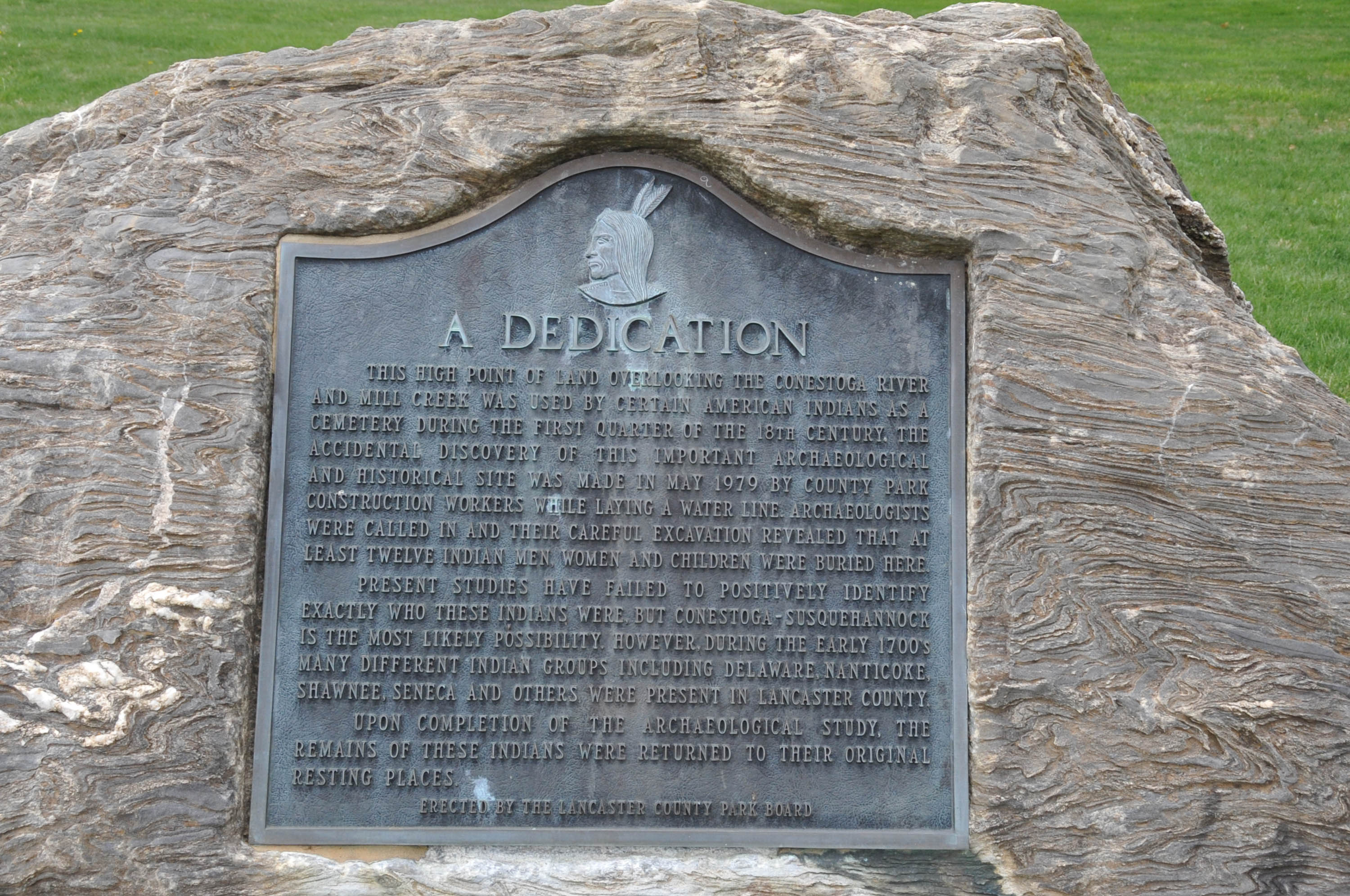
- Plaque in Central Park

- Location within Pennsylvania Location within the United States
- Location: On a knoll in Central Park, midway between the Conestoga River and Mill Creek, West Lampeter Township, Pennsylvania
- Coordinates: 40°01′7.07″N 76°17′3.67″W
- Area: 4.4 acres (1.8 ha)
- NRHP reference No.: 85000698
- Added to NRHP: April 4, 1985

The Park Site, designated 36LA96, is a historic archaeological site located in West Lampeter Township, Lancaster County, Pennsylvania, just south of the city of Lancaster. The site was excavated and assessed in 1979. The site features a Susquehannock burial site dated to the early 18th century and European-made artifacts.

In 1985, it was listed on the National Register of Historic Places as "Park Site 36La96". A plaque is posted on the site, and several artifacts are displayed at the park's Environmental Center. In 2023, an informational sign panel was installed at the site as an Eagle Scout project, which provides more information on the local Native American tribes of Lancaster County and the park site itself.
