= Ira Landis =

American historian (1899–1977)

Ira David Landis
- Born: January 12, 1899; Lititz, Pennsylvania, U.S.
- Died: February 27, 1977 (aged 78)
- Resting place: Landis Valley Cemetery
- Occupation: Minister · Historian · Farmer
- Spouse: Mabel E. Book
- Children: J. Dale Landis; Faith M. Landis
- Parent(s): Noah L. Landis; Annie Barbara Kreider

Ira David Landis (January 12, 1899 – February 27, 1977) was a Mennonite minister, amateur historian, and writer famous for his contributions to the Mennonite Research Journal and for founding the Lancaster Mennonite Historical Society and Hans Herr House museum. He also ran a farm with his wife in Lititz, PA. Landis was president of the Pennsylvania German Society for 1972.

== Early Archival Work 1930s-1950s ==
Landis began as an amateur archivist by keeping Mennonite church documents stored at his farmhouse. In 1939, prominent Mennonite theologian Harold S. Bender reached out to Landis for a variety of documents, notes, and summaries related to the Conference on Applied Nonresistance to add to the archive at Goshen College. This interaction led to a correspondence between the two over manuscripts, images, and church records that would be sent over to Goshen from local Mennonite communities in Lancaster, Pennsylvania. Many of these documents would be used in Bender's papers in the Mennonite Quarterly Review.

== Lancaster Mennonite Historical Society ==
In the late 1950s, Landis was entrusted with a large collection of papers from Christian E. Charles, one of the deacons at Landisville Mennonite Church. No longer able to house these documents at his home, he founded the Lancaster Mennonite Historical Society in 1958 to store and maintain the new archive. Under Landis, the society continued to grow and he founded the Mennonite Research Journal in 1960. He would remain the main editor of the quarterly journal from April 1960 until his death in 1977. During this period, Landis would go on to write many works and became known for his updated English translation of Martyrs Mirror in 1964.

In 1969, Landis acquired the Hans Herr House and renovated the property turning it into a Museum open to the public in 1974. The museum became listed under National Register of Historic Places due to the extensive restoration done by Landis and others. The Hans Herr House would go on to become a main site for many of Landis' archives. Following his death, his role was succeeded by Carolyn Charles Wenger, daughter of Christian Charles who provided the original documents which founded the historical society.

== Works (selection) ==
- The Missionary Movement among Lancaster Conference Mennonites, Scottdale, PA 1937.
- The Faith of Our Fathers on Eschatology, Lititz, PA 1946.
- The Landis Family Book, Lancaster, PA 1950, housed at University of Wisconsin
- I must see Switzerland: With 100 illustrations and maps, Lancaster, PA 1954
- The Lancaster Mennonite Conference: History and Background, Scottdale, PA 1956.
- Old mills in Lancaster County, Lancaster, PA 1964.
- Noah H. Mack: his life and times, 1861-1948, Scottdale, PA 1952, together with Jacob Paul Graybill and J. Paul Sauder.
- Martyrs Mirror (translation), 1964
