= Johannes Harnish Farmstead =

- U.S. National Register of Historic Places
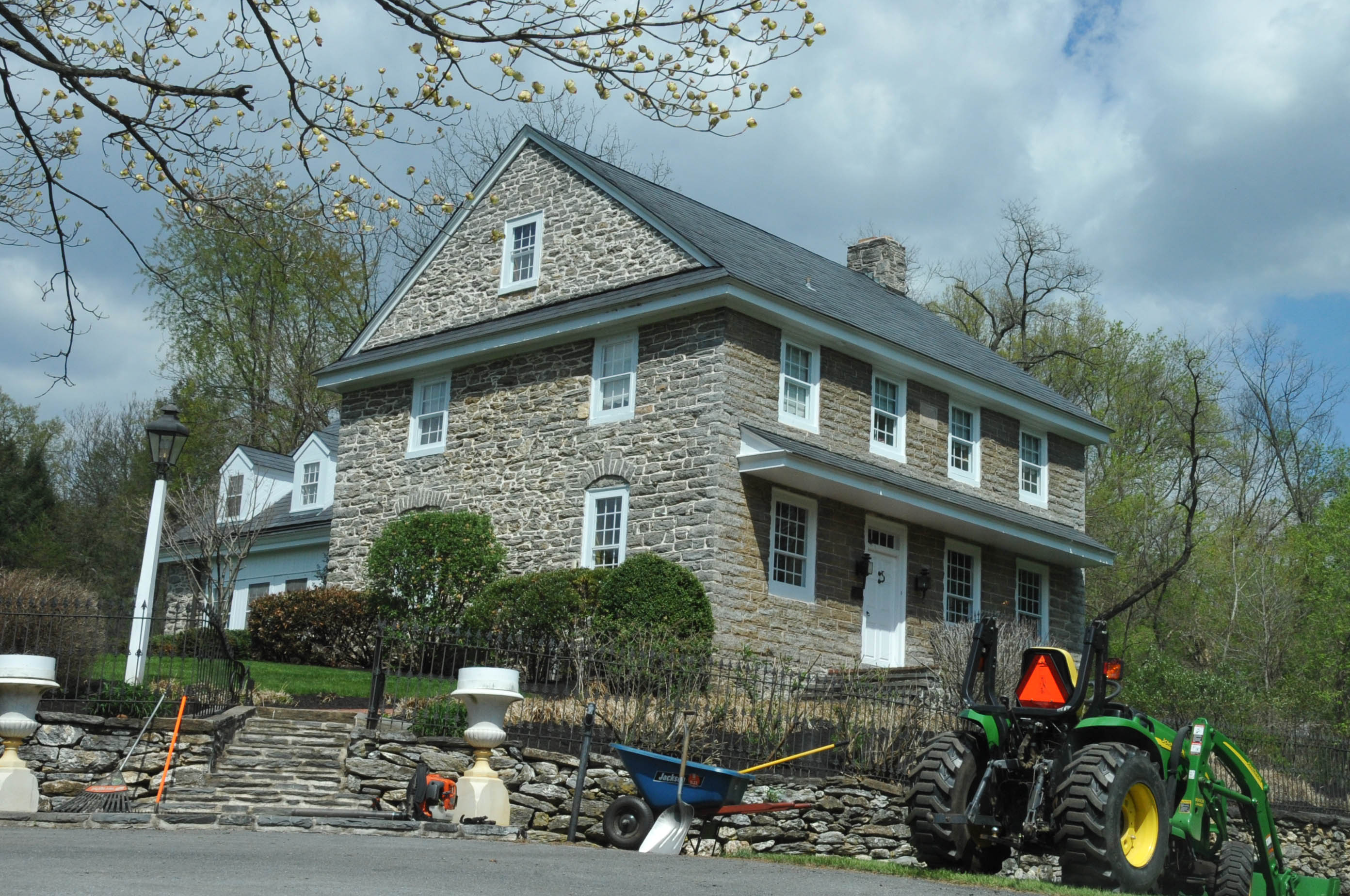

- Location within Pennsylvania Location within the United States
- Interactive map showing the location of Johannes Harnish Farmstead
- Location: Woodfield Crossing, 202, West Lampeter Township, Pennsylvania
- Coordinates: 40°00′05″N 76°17′11″W
- Area: 14.5 acres (5.9 ha)
- Built: 1774
- Built by: Sehner, Gottlieb; Bachman, John
- Architectural style: Penn. German vernacular
- MPS: Historic Farming Resources of Lancaster County MPS
- NRHP reference No.: 99000327
- Added to NRHP: March 12, 1999

The Johannes Harnish Farmstead is an historic home and farm that is located in West Lampeter Township, Lancaster County, Pennsylvania, United States.

It was listed on the National Register of Historic Places in 1999.

== History and architectural features ==
This property includes a Pennsylvania German style farmhouse, a brick Pennsylvania style ancillary dwelling (c. 1860), a frame kitchen (mid-19th century), a stone springhouse (late eighteenth century), and a frame tobacco shed (c 1925). Also located on the property are the ruins of a stone bank barn from the nineteenth century and the remains of the family burial ground dating to the eighteenth century. The farmhouse was built in 1774, and is a two-and-one-half-story, rectangular, stone dwelling. It is four bays by two bays and has a slate covered gable roof with shed dormer. A one-story rear addition was built between 1958 and 1960.
