= Lyndon, Pennsylvania =

Unincorporated community in Pennsylvania, US

- Unincorporated community
- Location in Pennsylvania Location in the United States
- Coordinates: 40°00′22″N 76°17′47″W
- Country: United States
- State: Pennsylvania
- County: Lancaster
- Township: West Lampeter
- Time zone: UTC-5 (Eastern (EST))
  - Summer (DST): UTC-4 (EDT)
- GNIS feature ID: 1180120

Lyndon is an unincorporated community located in West Lampeter Township in Lancaster County, Pennsylvania, United States. Lyndon is located just south of the city of Lancaster along U.S. Route 222.
