= Christian and Emma Herr Farm =

- U.S. National Register of Historic Places
- U.S. Historic district
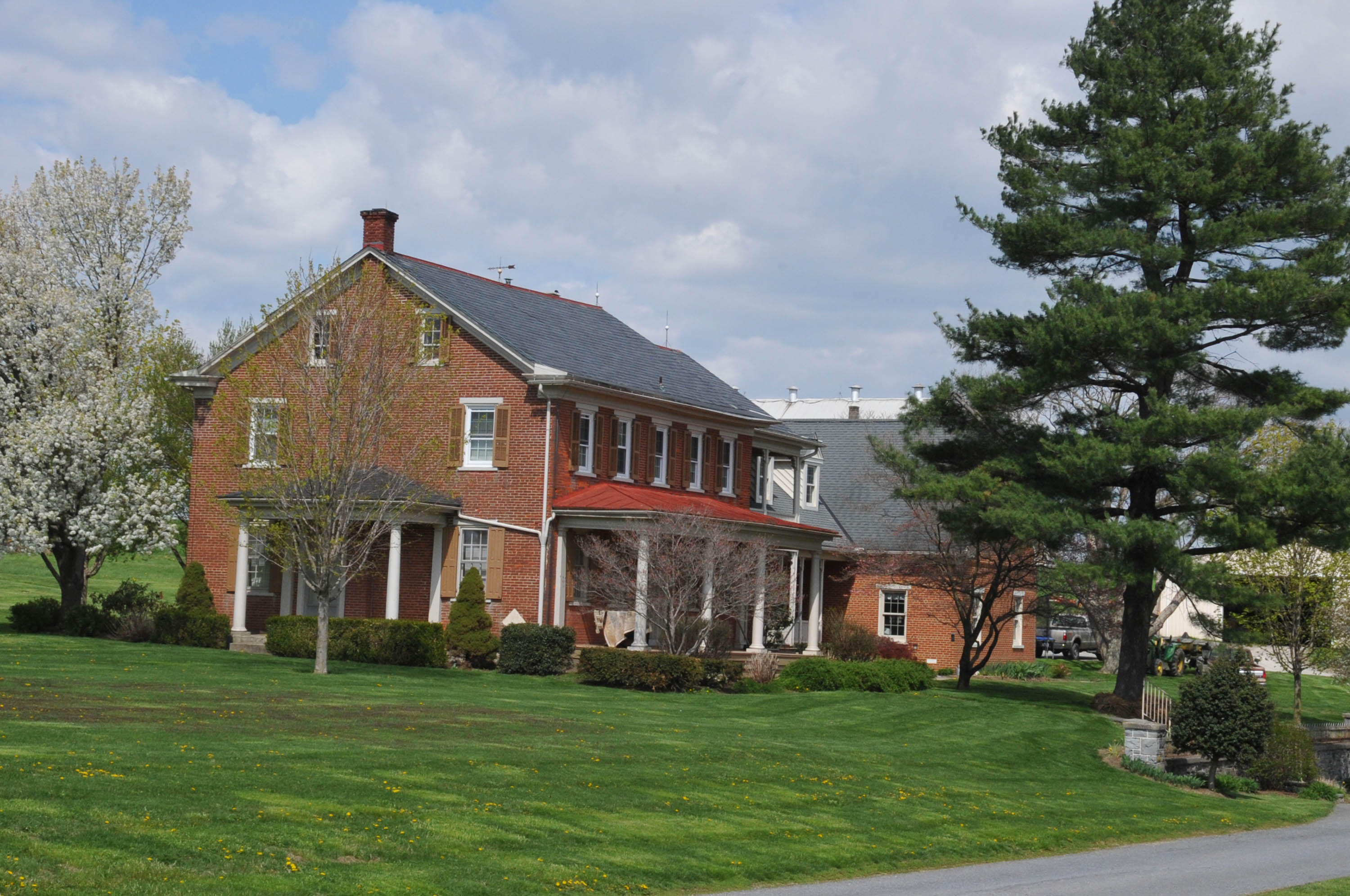

- Location within Pennsylvania Location within the United States
- Location: 2131 and 2133 South View Rd., West Lampeter Township, Pennsylvania
- Coordinates: 40°6′48″N 76°15′0″W
- Area: 100 acres (40 ha)
- Built: 1761, 1864, 1867, 1907
- Architectural style: Pennsylvania-style farmhouse
- MPS: Historic Farming Resources of Lancaster County MPS
- NRHP reference No.: 94001059
- Added to NRHP: August 30, 1994

Christian and Emma Herr Farm is a historic farm and national historic district located at West Lampeter Township, Lancaster County, Pennsylvania. The district includes six contributing buildings. They are a brick farmhouse, a stone end barn (1761), a frame tobacco barn (1907), a frame summer kitchen (c. 1890), a tenant house (1864), and a frame shed (1900-1920). The farmhouse was built in 1867, and is a 2 1/2-story, five bay by two bay, brick dwelling. It has a recessed three bay by two bay east wing, and a full-width front porch. The summer kitchen is attached to the wing.

It was listed on the National Register of Historic Places in 1994.
