= Strasburg, Pennsylvania =

Borough in Pennsylvania, US

Strasburg, Pennsylvania Schtraasebarig (Pennsylvania German)
- Borough
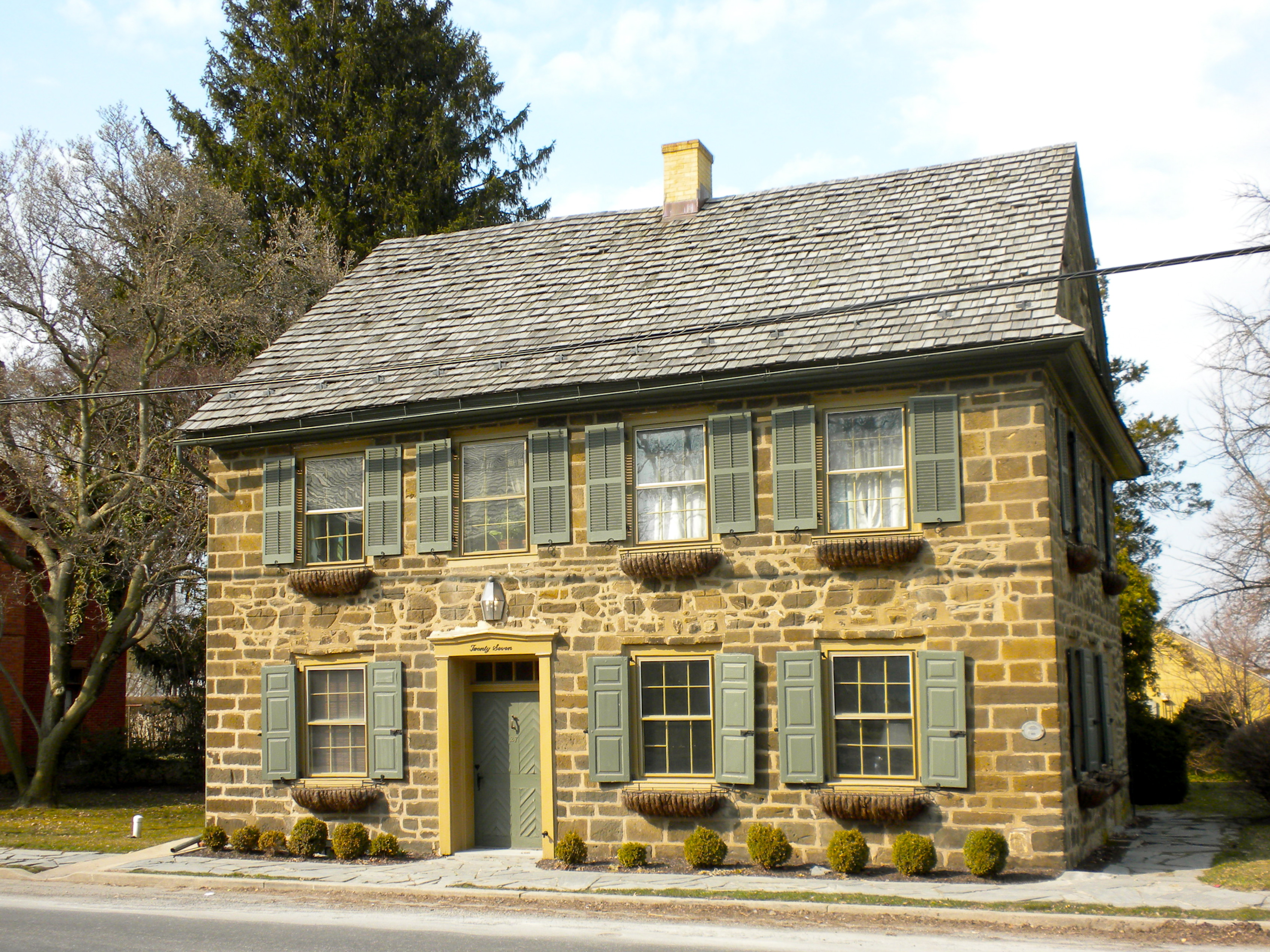
- 27 East Main Street, built in 1754
- Etymology: Prince-Bishopric of Strasbourg, Holy Roman Empire
- Location in Lancaster County, Pennsylvania

- Location in Pennsylvania Location in the United States
- Coordinates: 39°58′56″N 76°10′58″W
- Country: United States
- State: Pennsylvania
- County: Lancaster

Area
  - Total: 0.96 sq mi (2.49 km^{2})
  - Land: 0.96 sq mi (2.48 km^{2})
  - Water: 0.0039 sq mi (0.01 km^{2})
- Elevation: 463 ft (141 m)

Population (2020)
  - Total: 3,117
  - Density: 3,255.6/sq mi (1,256.98/km^{2})
- Time zone: UTC-5 (EST)
  - Summer (DST): UTC-4 (EDT)
- ZIP Code: 17579
- Area codes: 717 and 223
- FIPS code: 42-74712
- Website: strasburgboro.org
- Strasburg Historic District
- U.S. National Register of Historic Places
- U.S. Historic district
- Location: E. and W. Main, W. Miller, S. Decatur Sts., Strasburg, Pennsylvania
- Coordinates: 39°58′51″N 76°11′15″W
- Area: 68 acres (28 ha)
- Architectural style: Georgian, Federal, German vernacular
- NRHP reference No.: 83002258
- Added to NRHP: March 3, 1983

Strasburg (Pennsylvania German: Schtraasebarig or Schtraasbarig) is a borough in Lancaster County, Pennsylvania, United States. It developed as a linear village stretching approximately 2 miles (3 km) along the Great Conestoga Road, later known as the Strasburg Road. The population was 3,117 at the 2020 census.

The town was named after the then German city of Strasbourg, (today part of France) the native home of an early settler. The town is often called "Train Town USA" because of the many railroad attractions in and around town, including the Strasburg Rail Road and the Railroad Museum of Pennsylvania. Much of the movie Witness was filmed on a farm nearby. Much of the borough was listed as a historic district by the National Register of Historic Places in 1983.

== History ==
The Old Conestoga Road was in use by 1714, and by 1750 a tavern and some log houses were built near the current site of Strasburg. The community grew as regional trade with Philadelphia grew. By 1759, there were 32 taxable properties in the town, including about ten hotels. Many early settlers were Huguenots or Swiss or German Mennonites, and several church congregations of various faiths formed during the 1760s. The first church was built in 1807 by Methodists.

The Old Conestoga Road was the main path connecting Philadelphia with areas to the west, but in 1792 the new Philadelphia and Lancaster Turnpike was built, bypassing Strasburg 4 miles (6 km) to the north. However, in 1793 construction on the new Strasburg Road started, roughly following the old road, passing through West Chester on the way to Philadelphia. It attracted traffic because it was not a toll road, unlike the Philadelphia Turnpike. This road later developed into Pennsylvania Route 741.

By 1815, there were 90 houses in Strasburg, about half of which were two stories, indicating a relatively well-off population. There were 53 log, 29 brick, and four limestone houses. About half of the log houses survive today, as well as 12 of the brick houses and all four of the stone houses. About 150 other houses stand in the historic district, nearly all built before 1900.

== Geography ==
Strasburg is located in central Lancaster County at 39°58′56″N 76°10′58″W (39.982300, -76.182713). Pennsylvania Route 741 (Main Street) passes through the center of the borough, leading east 9 miles (14 km) to Gap and west 5.5 miles (8.9 km) to Willow Street. Pennsylvania Route 896 crosses the northeast side of Strasburg; it leads north 3 miles (5 km) to U.S. Route 30 and southeast 20 miles (32 km) to U.S. Route 1. Lancaster, the county seat, is 8 miles (13 km) northwest of Strasburg.

According to the United States Census Bureau, the borough has a total area of 1.0 square mile (2.6 km^{2}), of which 0.003 square miles (0.008 km^{2}), or 0.31%, are water. Strasburg is in the watershed of Pequea Creek, which flows southwest to the Susquehanna River.

== Demographics ==
Historical population
Census	Pop.	Note	%±
1840	445		—
1850	880		97.8%
1860	921		4.7%
1870	1,008		9.4%
1880	1,005		−0.3%
1890	918		−8.7%
1900	916		−0.2%
1910	885		−3.4%
1920	853		−3.6%
1930	975		14.3%
1940	1,706		75.0%
1950	1,890		10.8%
1960	2,081		10.1%
1970	1,897		−8.8%
1980	1,999		5.4%
1990	2,568		28.5%
2000	2,800		9.0%
2010	2,809		0.3%
2020	3,117		11.0%
2021 (est.)	3,114	▼	−0.1%
U.S. Decennial Census

=== 2020 census ===
As of the 2020 census, Strasburg had a population of 3,117. The median age was 42.4 years. 22.9% of residents were under the age of 18 and 20.3% of residents were 65 years of age or older. For every 100 females there were 91.7 males, and for every 100 females age 18 and over there were 90.1 males age 18 and over.

0.0% of residents lived in urban areas, while 100.0% lived in rural areas.

There were 1,243 households in Strasburg, of which 30.7% had children under the age of 18 living in them. Of all households, 60.3% were married-couple households, 12.6% were households with a male householder and no spouse or partner present, and 22.0% were households with a female householder and no spouse or partner present. About 21.4% of all households were made up of individuals and 9.1% had someone living alone who was 65 years of age or older.

There were 1,285 housing units, of which 3.3% were vacant. The homeowner vacancy rate was 0.1% and the rental vacancy rate was 3.1%.

Racial composition as of the 2020 census
Race	Number	Percent
White	2,796	89.7%
Black or African American	49	1.6%
American Indian and Alaska Native	2	0.1%
Asian	45	1.4%
Native Hawaiian and Other Pacific Islander	0	0.0%
Some other race	41	1.3%
Two or more races	184	5.9%
Hispanic or Latino (of any race)	173	5.6%

=== 2000 census ===
As of the census of 2000, there were 2,800 people, 1,110 households, and 798 families residing in the borough. The population density was 2,714.1 inhabitants per square mile (1,047.9/km^{2}). There were 1,135 housing units at an average density of 1,100.2 per square mile (424.8/km^{2}). The racial makeup of the borough was 97.64% White, 0.57% African American, 0.07% Native American, 0.86% Asian, 0.11% from other races, and 0.75% from two or more races. Hispanic or Latino of any race were 0.43% of the population.

There were 1,110 households, out of which 34.9% had children under the age of 18 living with them, 61.6% were married couples living together, 6.9% had a female householder with no husband present, and 28.1% were non-families. 23.7% of all households were made up of individuals, and 9.0% had someone living alone who was 65 years of age or older. The average household size was 2.52 and the average family size was 3.02.

In the borough the population was spread out, with 25.9% under the age of 18, 7.7% from 18 to 24, 30.6% from 25 to 44, 22.3% from 45 to 64, and 13.5% who were 65 years of age or older. The median age was 36 years. For every 100 females there were 92.4 males. For every 100 females age 18 and over, there were 90.5 males.

The median income for a household in the borough was $47,821, and the median income for a family was $56,829. Males had a median income of $38,946 versus $26,424 for females. The per capita income for the borough was $23,346. About 2.0% of families and 3.2% of the population were below the poverty line, including 5.0% of those under age 18 and 3.5% of those age 65 or over.

== Fire department ==
The borough of Strasburg is protected by the Strasburg Volunteer Fire Company, Lancaster County Fire Company #5-10, Zone 5. The volunteer fire department is located at 203 Franklin Street in a brand new four-garage-bay facility. The volunteer fire department operates a fleet of one rescue engine, one engine, one quint, one tanker, and one squad.

== Notable people ==
- John Alexander Ahl (1813–1882), congressman
- David Craighead (1924–2012), organist
- Matt Feiler (born 1992), football player for Los Angeles Chargers
- Don Wert (born 1938), baseball player for 1968 World Series champion Detroit Tigers

== Education ==
The borough is in the Lampeter-Strasburg School District.

== Attractions ==
- Strasburg Rail Road
- Choo Choo Barn
- National Toy Train Museum
- Railroad Museum of Pennsylvania
- Sight & Sound Theatres

== Gallery ==
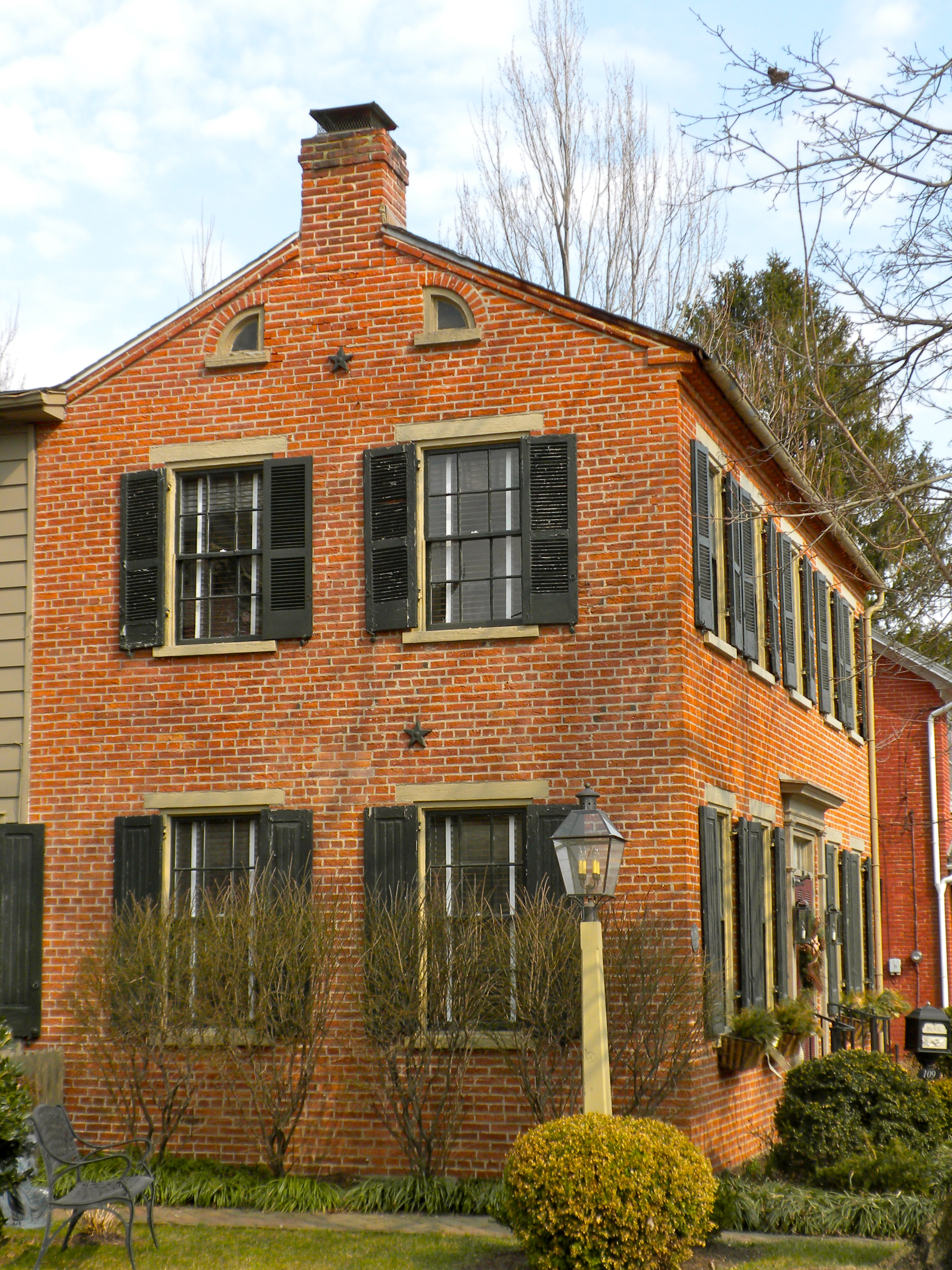
Old brick house on East Main Street

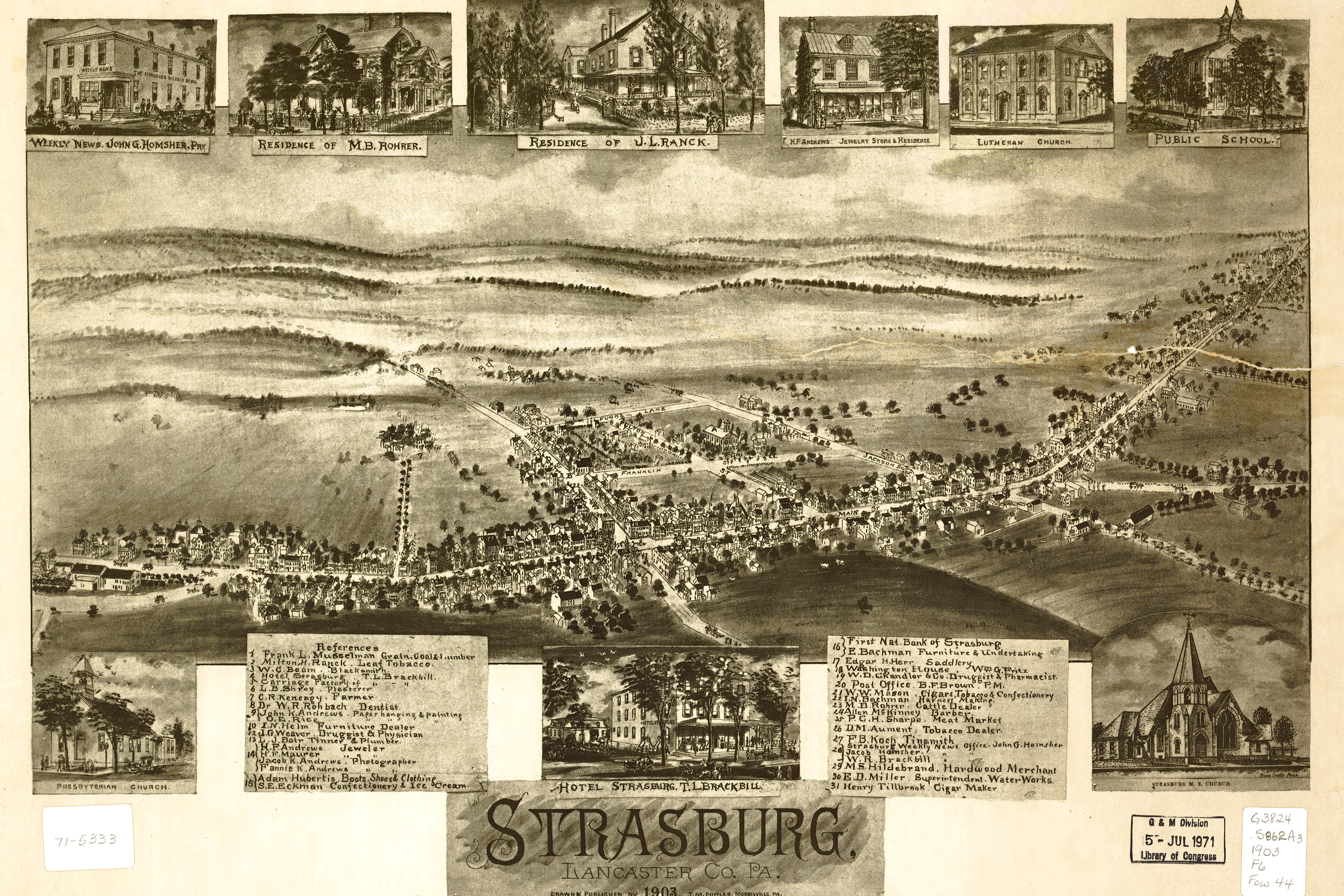
A Bird's-eye view map of Strasburg, published in 1903

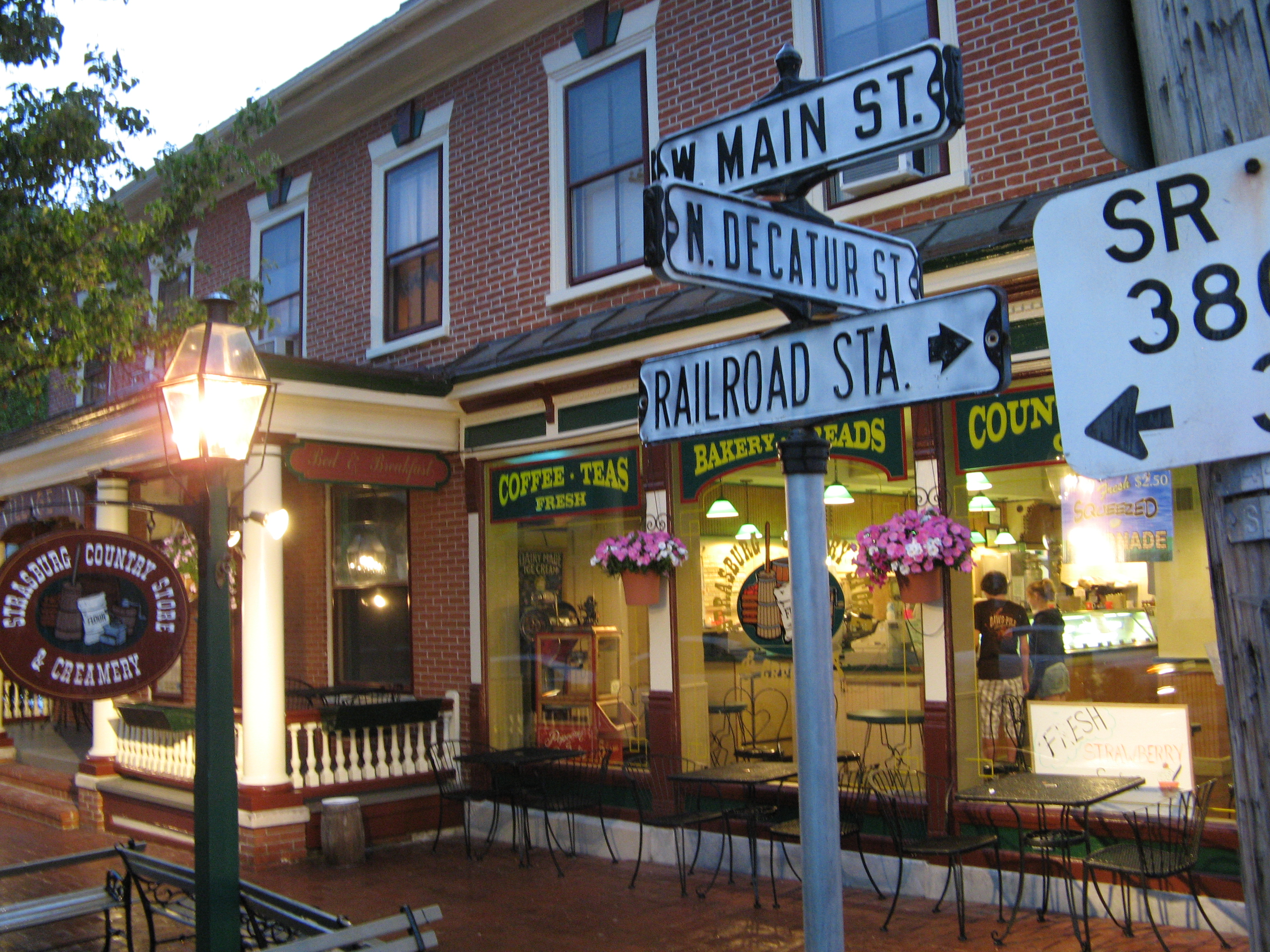
Strasburg Creamery Ice Cream Shoppe

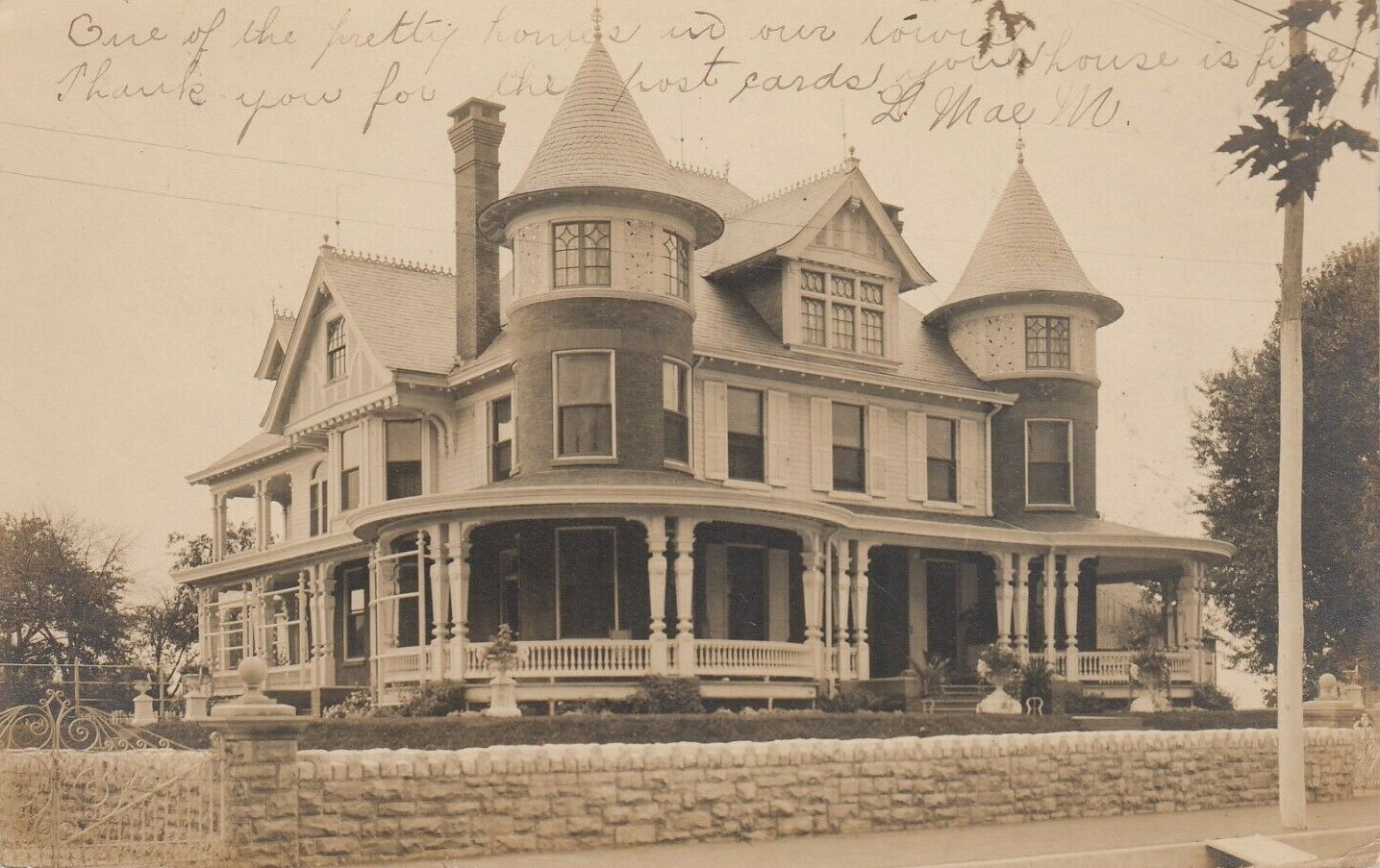
Gonder Mansion in 1906

== See also ==
- National Register of Historic Places listings in Lancaster County, Pennsylvania
