= Jeff Bianchi =

American baseball player (born 1986)

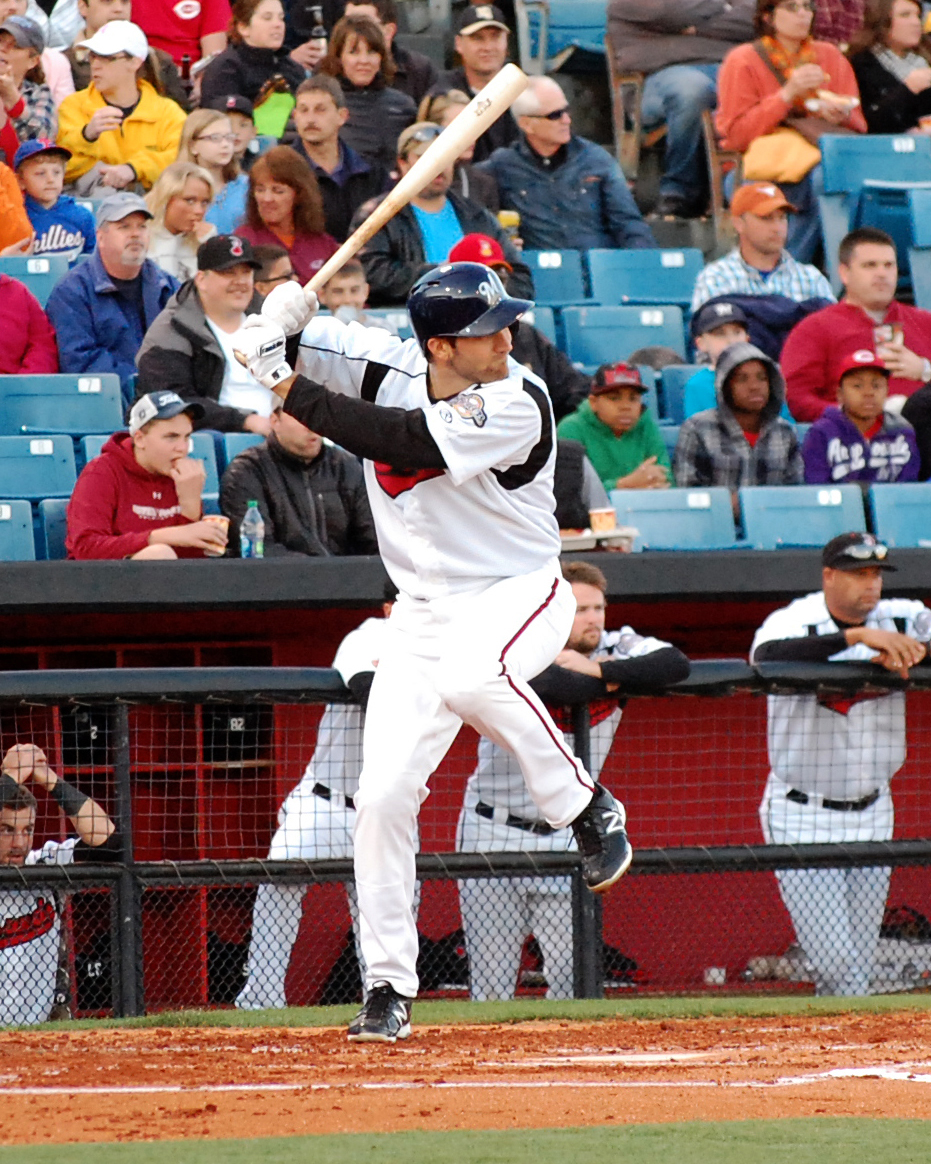
- Bianchi with the Nashville Sounds in 2013
- Infielder / Hitting coach
- Born: October 5, 1986 (age 40); Lampeter, Pennsylvania, U.S.
- Batted: Right Threw: Right

MLB debut
- July 13, 2012, for the Milwaukee Brewers

Last MLB appearance
- June 14, 2015, for the Boston Red Sox

MLB statistics
- Batting average: .215
- Home runs: 4
- Runs batted in: 40
- Stats at Baseball Reference

Teams
- Milwaukee Brewers (2012–2014); Boston Red Sox (2015)
Medals
Men's baseball
Representing United States
Pan American Games
Silver medal – second place	2015 Toronto	Team

Jeffrey Thomas Bianchi (born October 5, 1986) is an American former professional baseball shortstop and hitting coach. He appeared in Major League Baseball (MLB) for the Milwaukee Brewers and the Boston Red Sox.

Bianchi attended Lampeter-Strasburg High School in Lampeter, Pennsylvania. He was drafted in the second round (50th overall) of the 2005 MLB draft by the Kansas City Royals. He was a Topps Short-season/ Rookie All-Star.

== Career ==
=== Kansas City Royals ===
In 2008, Bianchi won the Frank White award for being the best defensive player in the Royals minor league system while playing for the Wilmington Blue Rocks.

Bianchi was added to the Royals' 40-man roster following the 2009 season to protect him from the Rule 5 draft.

In March 2010, Bianchi underwent Tommy John elbow surgery, sidelining him for the 2010 season. Bianchi returned in 2011 and appeared in 119 games for the Northwest Arkansas Naturals, hitting .259. After the 2011 season, he was designated for assignment.

=== Milwaukee Brewers ===
The Chicago Cubs claimed him off waivers on December 9, 2011, but on January 11, 2012 they designated him for assignment and he was claimed by the Milwaukee Brewers.

Bianchi was recalled by the Brewers on August 22 when Randy Wolf was released.

Bianchi played for the Brewers in 2013 and has played a range of positions such as shortstop, second base, and third base. On May 24, 2014, he was outrighted off the 40-man roster. He was called back up on June 29, 2014. Bianchi declined a minor league assignment on October 12 and became a free agent.

=== Boston Red Sox ===
On January 11, 2015, Bianchi signed a minor league deal with the Red Sox. On May 24, 2015, Bianchi was called up to the Red Sox when they placed Shane Victorino on the 15-day DL. He was designated for assignment on May 28 and re-signed with the team three days later. Bianchi was re-designated on June 15. He was reassigned to the minors, and was granted free agency on October 5.

=== Colorado Rockies ===
On April 1, 2016, Bianchi signed a minor league contract with the Colorado Rockies organization. In 66 games for the Triple–A Albuquerque Isotopes, he batted .245/.314/.306 with two home runs and 19 RBI. Bianchi elected free agency following the season on November 7.

== Coaching career ==
After the 2016 season, Bianchi joined the Milwaukee Brewers as a scout, and remained in that position through the 2020 season. On March 16, 2021, Bianchi was named hitting coach for the Lancaster Barnstormers of the Atlantic League of Professional Baseball for the 2021 season. Bianchi also served as an assistant coach for alma mater Lampeter-Strasburg High School during the Spring 2021 season.
