= Hans Herr House =

Historic house in Pennsylvania, United States

- U.S. National Register of Historic Places
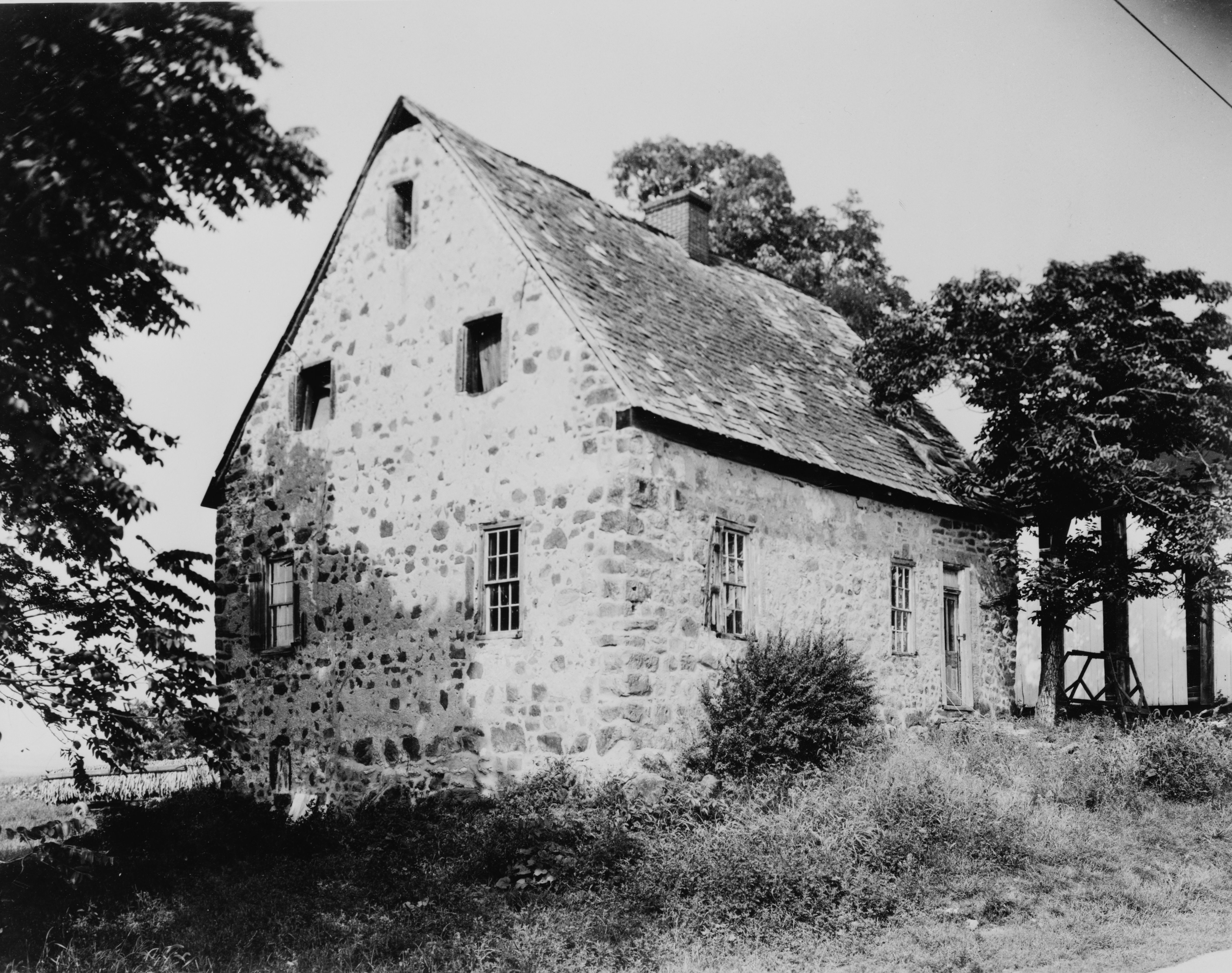
- Hans Herr House, 1971 HABS photo

- Location within Pennsylvania Location within the United States
- Location: 1849 Hans Herr Drive, Willow Street, Pennsylvania
- Coordinates: 39°58′51″N 76°15′44″W
- Area: 1.9 acres (0.77 ha)
- Built: 1719
- NRHP reference No.: 71000708
- Added to NRHP: May 3, 1971

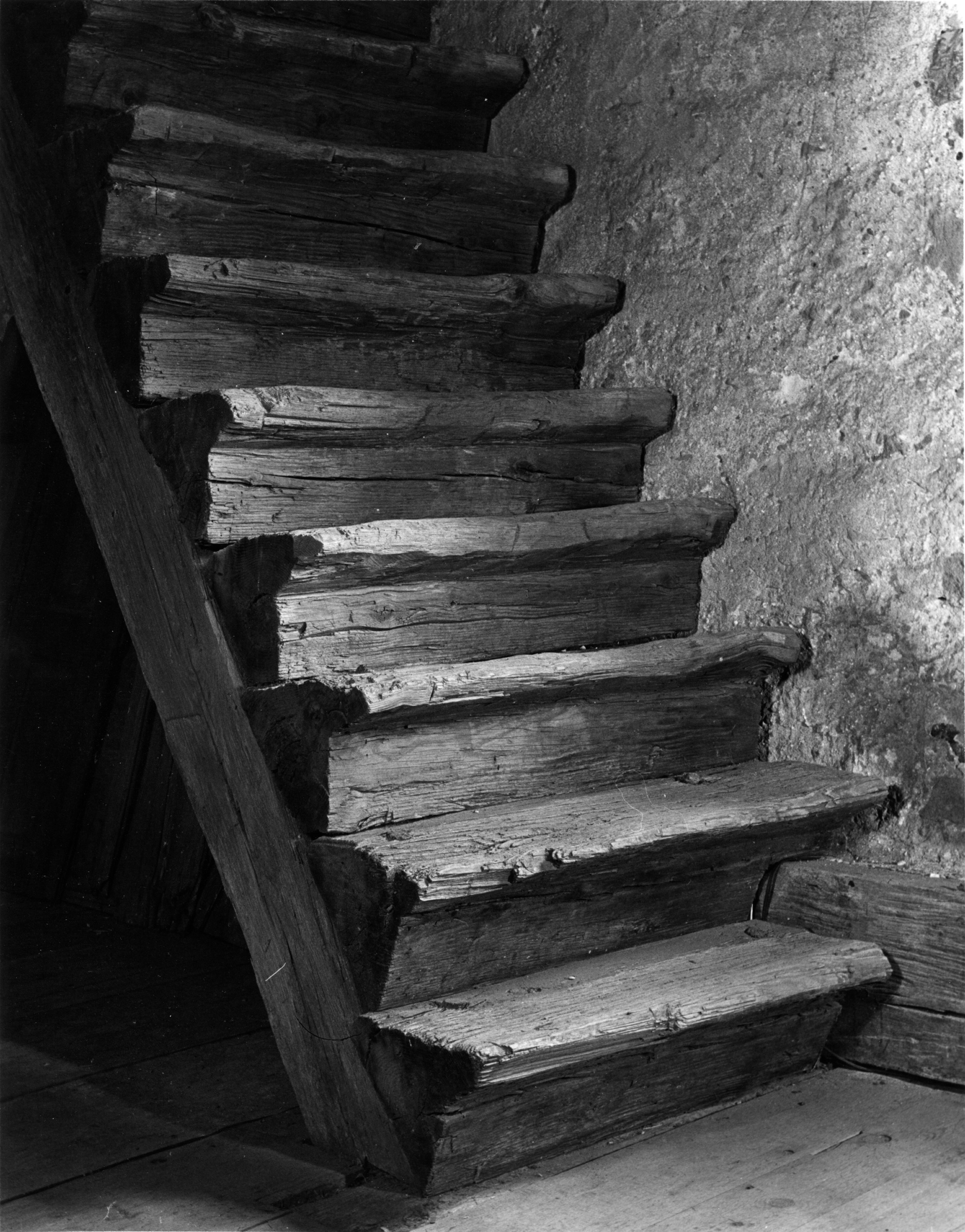
Staircase in the Herr House

The Hans Herr House, also known as the Christian Herr House, is a historic home located in West Lampeter Township, Lancaster County, Pennsylvania. It was built in 1719, and is a 1 1/2-story, rectangular sandstone Germanic dwelling. It measures 37 feet, 9 inches, by 30 feet, 10 inches. It is the oldest dwelling in Lancaster County and the oldest Mennonite meetinghouse in America.

== Early history ==
The Hans Herr house was built by the Herr family in 1719 by Christian Herr. The house served as a meetinghouse for Mennonites. The Mennonites who worshipped there formed the nucleus of what became the Willow Street Mennonite Congregation. The house continued to be use as a private residence until about 1900, after which time it was used as storage space.

== Restoration ==
The Hans Herr House was purchased by Lancaster Mennonite Historical Society in 1969. In the early 1970s the property underwent extensive renovations led by Ira Landis to restore it to resemble the original Herr residence. It was listed on the National Register of Historic Places in 1971. Following its restoration it became a private museum open to the public in 1974.

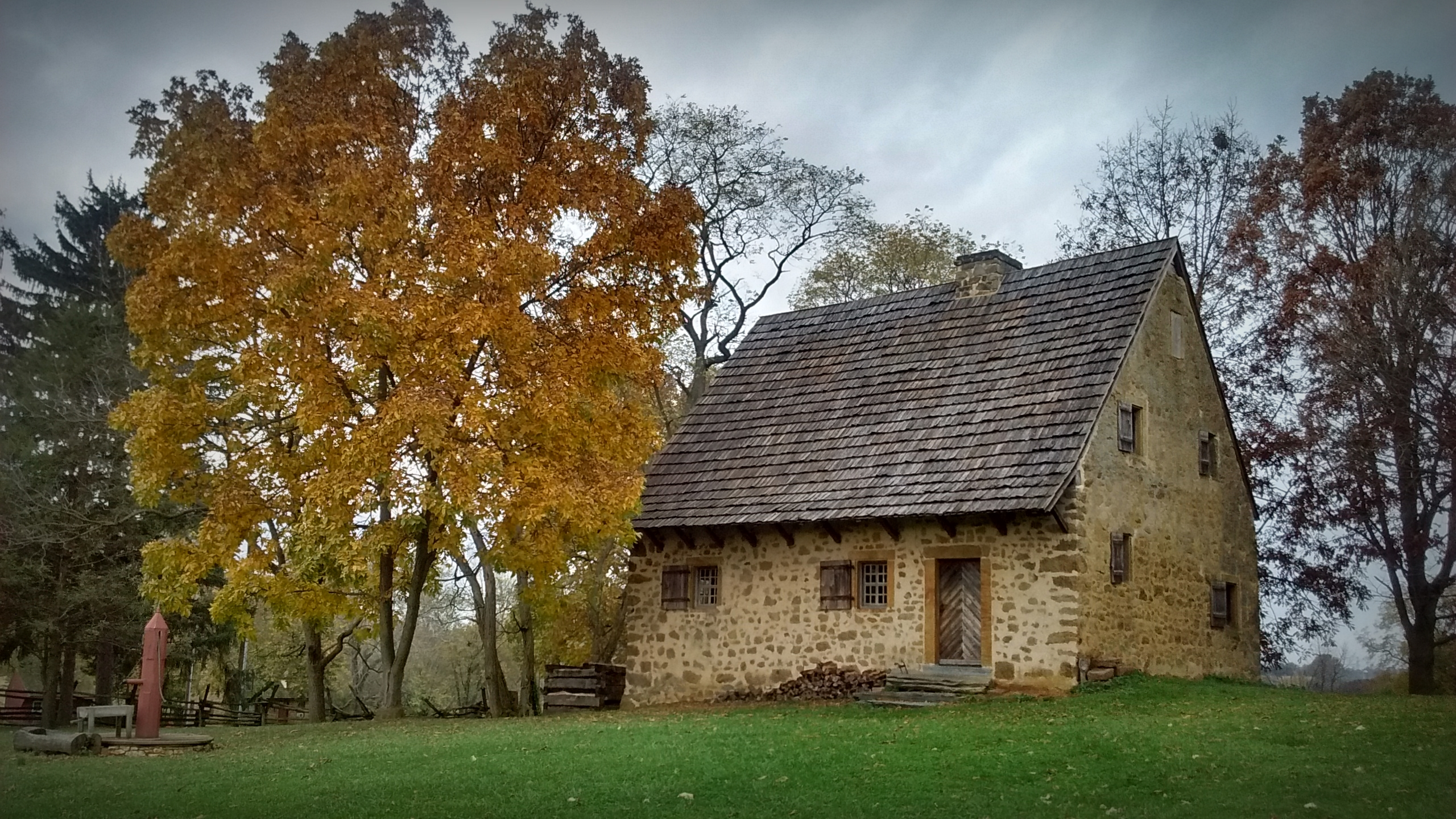
The 1719 Herr House in the fall of 2017.

== Lancaster Longhouse ==
In 2010 the Lancaster Mennonite Historical Society added the first major addition to the Hans Herr property since the 1700s by building a replica longhouse based on the remnants of one found during the 1969 renovation. The stated purpose for this exhibit was to honor the legacy of the indigenous peoples who lived in Lancaster County before the arrival of Anabaptist settlers. In 2011, this exhibit was further furnished with a collection of over 200 artifacts found in the area from before the arrival of Europeans.

== Architectural features ==
The Hans Herr house is known for its unique style and architecture reflecting the German medieval period. Because it was not lived in during the 20th century, it never underwent any modernization, making it a well-preserved historic structure. The building contains numerous architectural characteristics that have their roots in medieval south-German architecture, such as a steeply pitched roof with two attic levels, small asymmetrical windows, a date stone carved into the door lintel, a central chimney, and a staircase where each step is a single pegged into a diagonal beam.

The museum complex also houses the Georgian-style 1835 Shaub House, the Victorian-style 1890s Huber House, several barns and outbuildings with animals, exhibit buildings, blacksmith shop, bake-oven, smoke house, and a collection of farm equipment. Exhibits focus on Mennonite history, colonial and Victorian-era farm life, and the Herr family. The museum opened in 1974 and is administered by the Lancaster Mennonite Historical Society.
