= Lampeter, Pennsylvania =

Unincorporated community in Pennsylvania, US

- Census-designated place
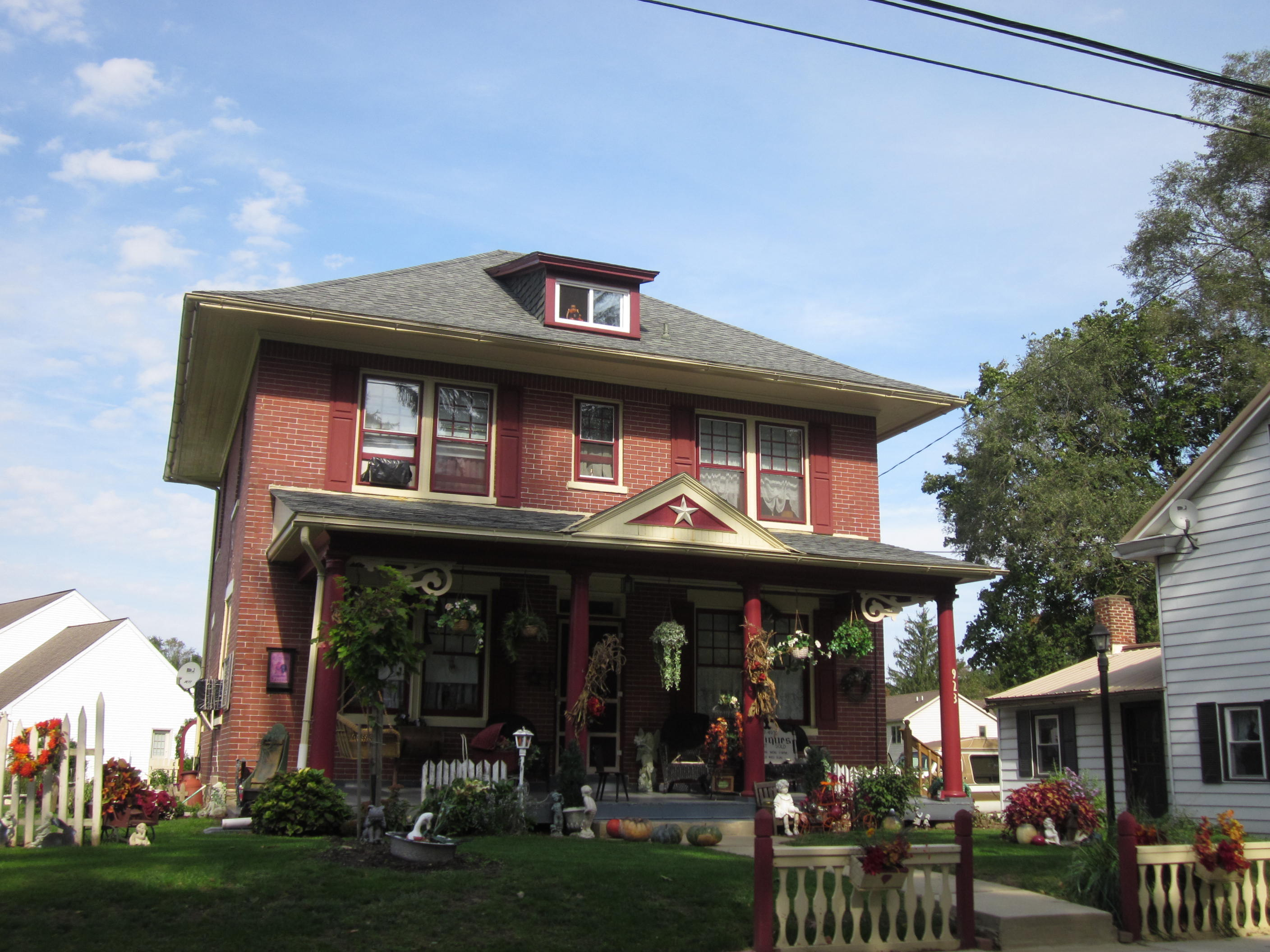

- Location in Pennsylvania Location in the United States
- Coordinates: 39°59′24″N 76°14′23″W
- Country: United States
- State: Pennsylvania
- County: Lancaster
- Township: West Lampeter

Area
  - Total: 1.72 sq mi (4.45 km^{2})
  - Land: 1.71 sq mi (4.44 km^{2})
  - Water: 0 sq mi (0.00 km^{2})
- Elevation: 407 ft (124 m)

Population (2020)
  - Total: 1,737
  - Density: 1,012.6/sq mi (390.98/km^{2})
- Time zone: UTC-5 (Eastern (EST))
  - Summer (DST): UTC-4 (EDT)
- ZIP code: 17537
- Area code: 717
- FIPS code: 42-41192
- GNIS feature ID: 1203977

Lampeter is an unincorporated community and census-designated place (CDP) in West Lampeter Township, Pennsylvania, United States. As of the 2010 census, it had a population of 1,669. It is a suburb of Lancaster and has a ZIP code of 17537. The community was named after Lampeter, in Wales.

== Geography ==
Lampeter is in central Lancaster County, in the eastern part of West Lampeter Township. It is bordered to the west by the Willow Street CDP. Lampeter is 5 miles (8 km) southeast of the center of Lancaster, the county seat. Pennsylvania Route 741 passes through the center of the community, leading east 3 miles (5 km) to Strasburg. U.S. Route 222 forms the western edge of Lampeter, separating it from Willow Street; US 222 leads north into the center of Lancaster and southeast 9 miles (14 km) to Quarryville.

According to the U.S. Census Bureau, the Lampeter CDP has a total area of 1.7 square miles (4.4 km^{2}), of which 0.9 acres (3,600 m^{2}), or 0.08%, are water. The community drains north via Big Spring Run to Mill Creek, a tributary of the Conestoga River, and south via unnamed streams to Pequea Creek. Both the Conestoga River and Pequea Creek are tributaries of the Susquehanna River.

== Demographics ==
Historical population
Census	Pop.	Note	%±
2020	1,737		—
U.S. Decennial Census

== Neighborhoods ==
Lampeter Village

Lampeter Village is in the Lampeter-Strasburg School District. It is one of the smallest neighborhoods in Lampeter, with its main road being Lampeter Road.

Pioneer Woods

Pioneer Woods is an apartment neighborhood located off Lampeter Road. Pioneer Woods is divided into two different sections. It has 1-, 2-, and 3-bedroom apartments, townhouses, and an office.

Applecroft

Applecroft is a middle class neighborhood in Lampeter off Lampeter Road.

Candlestick

Candlestick is a middle class neighborhood in Lampeter off Village Road.

Hunter's Ridge

Hunter's Ridge is located in a rural area. It is an upper-middle-class neighborhood far off from Lampeter Road.

== Fire protection ==
One of the Lampeter Fire Department is located at 851 Village Road Lampeter, Pa

The Lampeter Fire Station is and has been an all-volunteer fire company for over 108 years. Each year for three days in September, The Lampeter Fair is held on the grounds behind the Lampeter Fire Co., giving local residents a chance to exhibit animals, produce, and artwork. It is a fundraiser for the fire company and brings the larger community together.
