= West Lampeter Township, Pennsylvania =

Township in Pennsylvania, US

Coordinates: 39°59′00″N 76°13′59″W

- Township
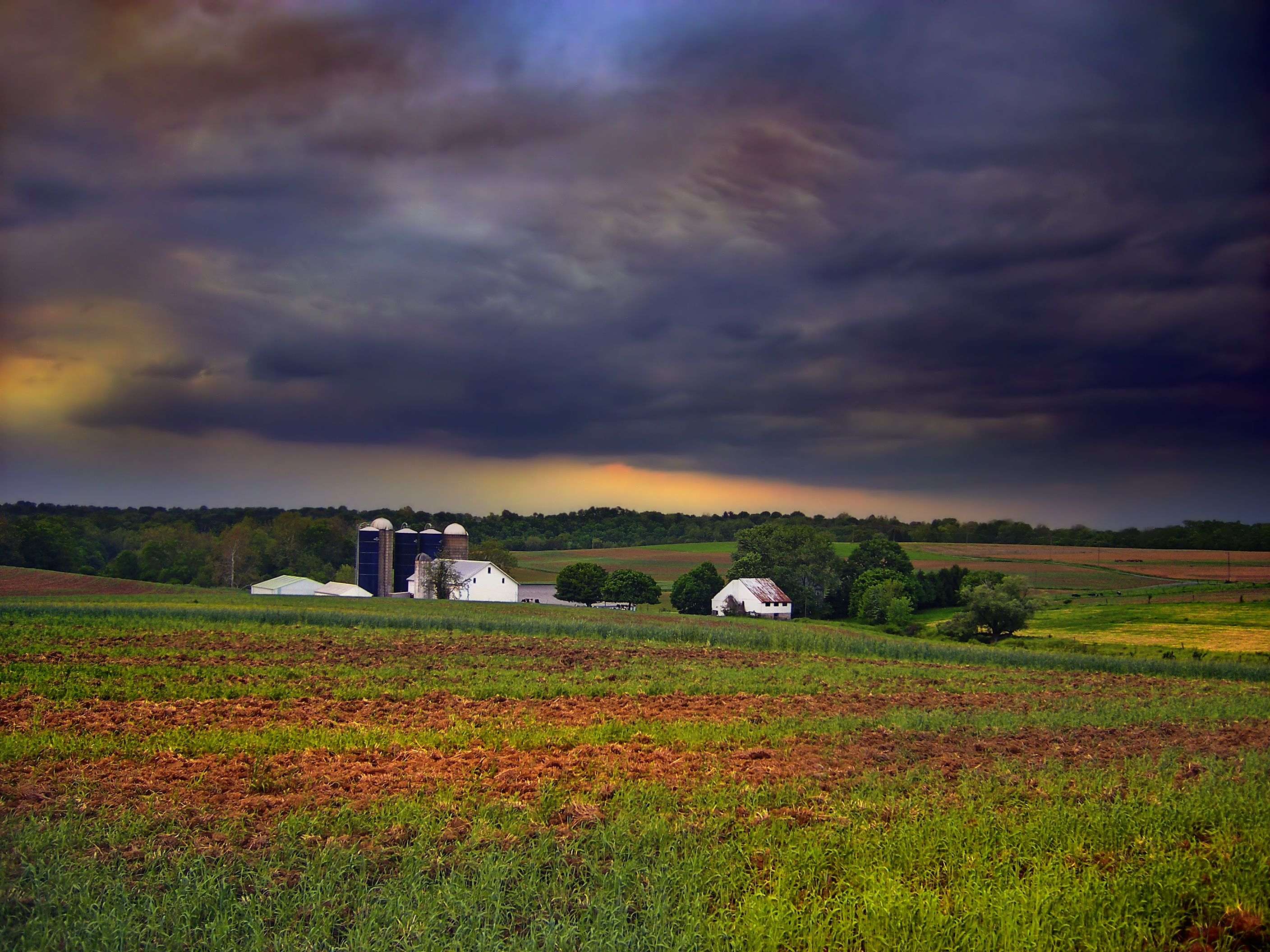
- A farm in West Lampeter Township

- Seal

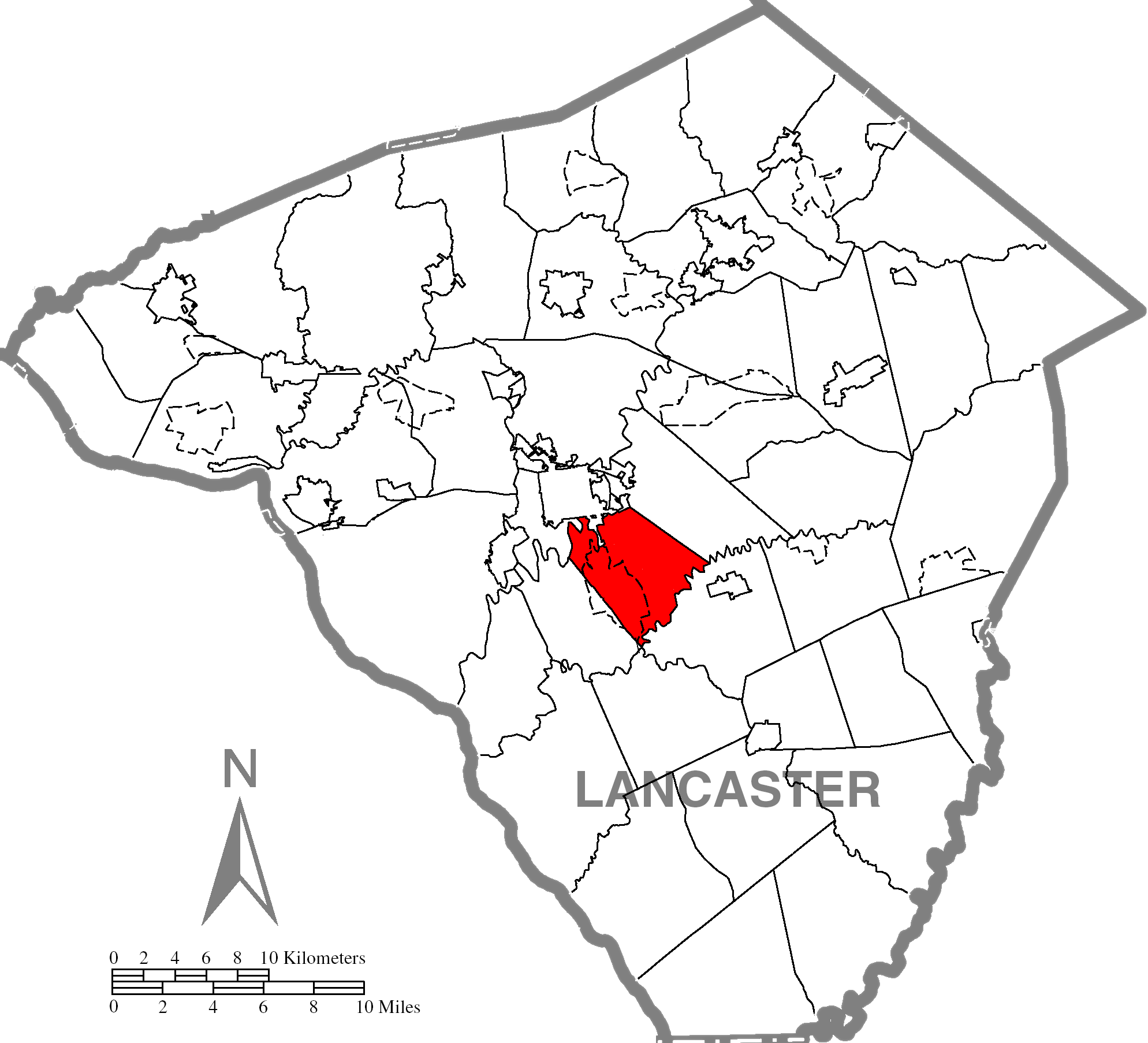
- Map of Lancaster County, Pennsylvania highlighting West Lampeter Township

- Map of Lancaster County, Pennsylvania
- Country: United States
- State: Pennsylvania
- County: Lancaster
- Incorporated: 1841

Government
  - Type: Board of Supervisors

Area
  - Total: 16.62 sq mi (43.04 km^{2})
  - Land: 16.40 sq mi (42.47 km^{2})
  - Water: 0.22 sq mi (0.57 km^{2})

Population (2020)
  - Total: 17,365 ▲
  - Estimate (2021): 17,394
  - Density: 972.9/sq mi (375.64/km^{2})
- Time zone: UTC-5 (Eastern (EST))
  - Summer (DST): UTC-4 (EDT)
- Area code: 717
- FIPS code: 42-071-83256
- Website: www.westlampeter.com

West Lampeter Township is a township that is located in central Lancaster County, Pennsylvania, United States. The population was 17,365 at the time of the 2020 census.

== History ==
The Johannes Harnish Farmstead, Christian and Emma Herr Farm, Hans Herr House, Lime Valley Covered Bridge, Neff's Mill Covered Bridge, Park Site, Rock Ford Plantation, and Weber-Weaver Farm are all located in this township and are all listed on the National Register of Historic Places.

== Geography ==
According to the United States Census Bureau, the township has a total area of 16.4 square miles (42.6 km^{2}), all land.

The Conestoga River forms part of the northern boundary of the township, and Pequea Creek forms the southern boundary. The township is bordered to the north by the city of Lancaster and contains the unincorporated communities of Lyndon, Mylin Corners, Lampeter, Lime Valley, and part of Willow Street.

== Demographics ==
Historical population
Census	Pop.	Note	%±
2000	13,145		—
2010	15,209		15.7%
2020	17,365		14.2%
2021 (est.)	17,394		0.2%
U.S. Decennial Census

At the time of the 2000 census, there were 13,145 people, 5,284 households, and 3,762 families living in the township.

The population density was 800.0 inhabitants per square mile (308.9/km^{2}). There were 5,467 housing units at an average density of 332.7 units per square mile (128.5 units/km^{2}).

The racial makeup of the township was 97.35% White, 0.79% African American, 0.05% Native American, 0.60% Asian, 0.01% Pacific Islander, 0.70% from other races, and 0.50% from two or more races. Hispanic or Latino of any race were 1.72%.

There were 5,284 households; 27.6% had children who were under the age of eighteen living with them, 63.4% were married couples living together, 5.3% had a female householder with no husband present, and 28.8% were non-families. Out of all of the households that were documented, 26.1% were made up of individuals, and 17.8% had one person living alone who was aged sixty-five or older.

The average household size was 2.42 and the average family size was 2.91.

The age distribution was 22.5%of residents who were under the age of 18, 5.1% from 18 to 24, 24.3% from 25 to 44, 19.7% from 45 to 64, and 28.3% 65 or older. The median age was 44 years.

For every one hundred females, there were 87.5 males. For every one hundred females who were aged eighteen or older, there were 83.6 males.

The median household income was $51,043 and the median family income was $61,053. Males had a median income of $41,944 compared with that of $26,848 for females.

The per capita income for the township was $24,713.

Approximately 2.2% of families and 3.1% of the population were living below the poverty line, including 3.4% of those who were under the age of eighteen and 4.2% of those who were aged sixty-five or older.

== Sports ==
Club	League	Venue	Established	Championships
Lancaster Liberty	GPBL Basketball	Student Life Center	2009	

== Notable person ==
- Lloyd Smucker, U.S. representative, former Pennsylvania state senator
