= D14 =

D14 may refer to:

== Vehicles ==
=== Aircraft ===
- Dewoitine D.14, a French transport aircraft
- Fokker D.XIV, a Dutch fighter aircraft

=== Ships ===
- Greek destroyer Vasilefs Georgios (D14), a G- and H-class destroyer of the Royal Hellenic Navy
- HMS Armada (D14), a Battle-class destroyer of the Royal Navy
- HMS Avenger (D14), an Avenger-class escort carrier of the Royal Navy

=== Other ===
- Allis-Chalmers D14, an American tractor
- Pennsylvania Railroad class D14, an American steam locomotive
- D14/4 Supreme, a BSA Bantam motorbike
- LNER Class D14, a class of British steam locomotives

== Other uses ==
- D14 road (Croatia)
- D14, a bald eagle from the 2012 clutch of the Decorah Bald Eagles
- D14 series of Honda D engines
