= Reading 1187 =

Preserved RDG A-4b class 0-4-0 camelback steam locomotive

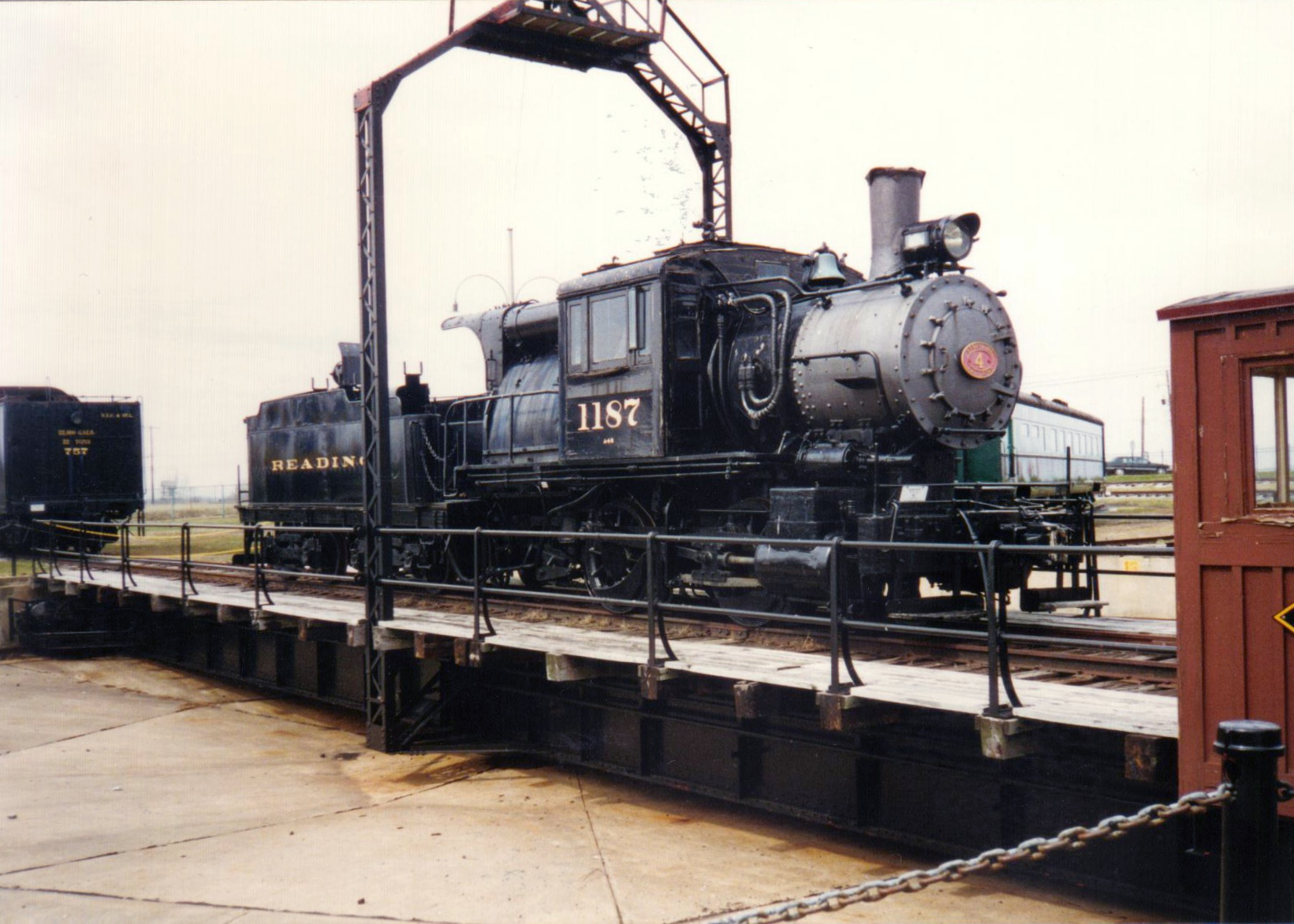
- Reading No. 1187 on display on the turntable at the Railroad Museum of Pennsylvania in Strasburg, Pennsylvania, in 1996
Type and origin
- Power type: Steam
- Builder: Baldwin Locomotive Works
- Serial number: 21831
- Build date: March 1903
Specifications
- Configuration
  - Whyte: 0-4-0
  - UIC: B ’h2
- Gauge: 4 ft 8 1/2 in (1,435 mm) standard gauge
- Driver dia.: 50 in (1,270 mm)
- Length: 48 ft 10 in (14.88 m)
- Loco weight: 108,000 lb (49.0 tonnes)
- Fuel type: Anthracite coal
- Fuel capacity: 11,000 lb (5.0 tonnes)
- Water cap.: 7,300 US gal (28,000 L; 6,100 imp gal)
- Boiler pressure: 200 psi (1.38 MPa)
- Cylinders: Two, outside
- Valve gear: Stephenson
- Valve type: Piston valves
- Loco brake: Steam
- Train brakes: Steam
- Couplers: Knuckle
Performance figures
- Tractive effort: 20,890 lbf (92.92 kN)
Career
- Operators: Reading Company; E&G Brooke Plant; Strasburg Rail Road
- Class: A4b
- Numbers: RDG 1187; E&G 4; SRC 4
- Retired: 1962 (revenue service); May 27, 1967 (excursion service)
- Restored: November 9, 1962 (excursion service) 2023 (cosmetically)
- Current owner: Age of Steam Roundhouse
- Disposition: On static display

Reading 1187 is a camelback A-4b class 0-4-0 "Switcher" type steam locomotive, built by the Baldwin Locomotive Works (BLW) for the Philadelphia and Reading Railroad (RDG). It was primarily used for yard switching services, until 1946, when it was sold to the Colorado Fuel and Iron Company's (CF&I) E&G Brooke Plant as No. 4. In 1962, it made its way to the Strasburg Railroad (SRC) in Strasburg, Pennsylvania to be used in hauling tourist trains, but due to its small size, it was reassigned to switching passenger cars. After being removed from service in 1967, No. 1187 sat on display at the Railroad Museum of Pennsylvania (RRMPA), before sitting idle at the Strasburg yard. In 2020, it was acquired by the Age of Steam Roundhouse, where it is on static display after a cosmetic restoration at their location in Sugarcreek, Ohio.

== History ==
=== Revenue service ===
In the turn of the 20th century, the Philadelphia and Reading Company (RDG) designed new classes of steam locomotives with the newly introduced wootten firebox to burn anthracite coal more easily, as well as to increase the tractive effort and economical reliability. One of these new classes was the A-4as, which was a class of 0-4-0 camelback switcher locomotives. Coming from the Baldwin Locomotive Works (BLW) in Philadelphia, Pennsylvania, No. 1187 was the first locomotive of this class to be built in March 1903, with nineteen other A-4as being built that same year. No. 1187 was initially assigned for yard switching services in Reading to push and pull freight cars from one spot to another.

In 1906, No. 1187 was modified with a larger tender, an increase in boiler pressure, and was re-classified as an A-4b. The locomotive was subsequently able to pull longer strings of cars, and the amount of time it operated between refueling was increased. In the late 1940s, the RDG began selling off their smaller steam locomotives, and No. 1187 was sold in 1946 to the Birdsboro E&G Brooke division of the Colorado Fuel and Iron Company (CF&I), who renumbered it to No. 4. There, the locomotive was reassigned to switch hopper cars and gondola cars loaded with steel around the plant's yard.

=== Preservation ===
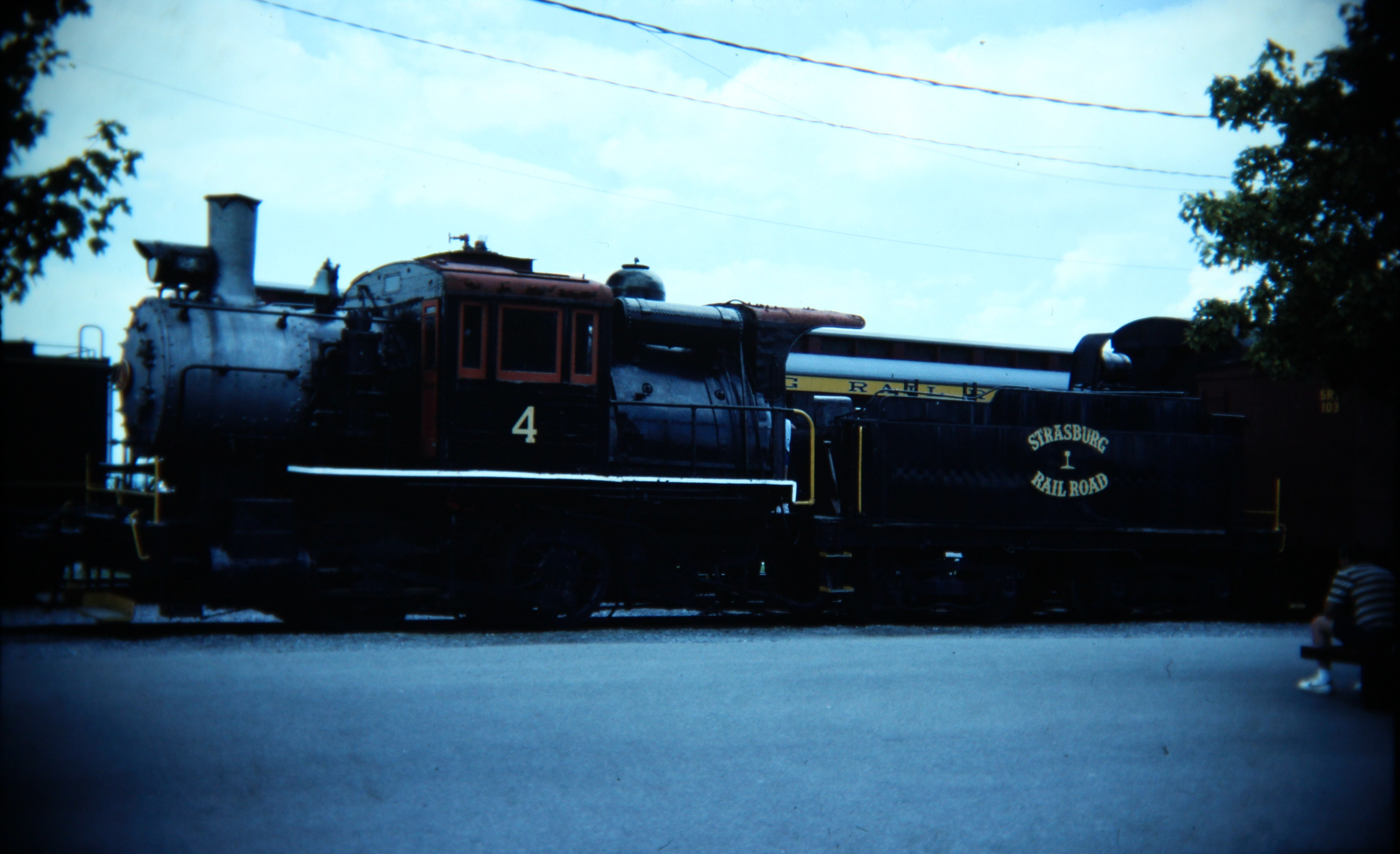
No. 4 on static display at the East Strasburg Station on July 19, 1984

In 1962, No. 4 was purchased by the Strasburg Railroad (SRC), who was looking for a running mate for their ex-Canadian National 0-6-0 7312 (numbered 31 at the time). Retaining its E&G road number, No. 4 was subsequently repaired and repainted to match the SRC's paint scheme of that time. Afterwards, it moved under its own power to the SRC. It pulled its first train there on November 9, 1962, and it continued to pull the SRC's tourist trains between Strasburg and Leaman Place. However, No. 4 was shown to be too small and slow to pull their longer trains, and instead of anthracite, the SRC fired up the locomotive with Bituminous coal, resulting in a decrease of the locomotive's boiler pressure.

Soon, No. 4 was reassigned by the SRC to maneuver around their station, and to switch passenger cars around, and the SRC's trains would mainly be handled by larger locomotives, including 31, Pennsylvania Railroad 4-4-0 1223, and Great Western 2-10-0 90. On May 27, 1967, No. 4 was used by the SRC for the final time, as it was pulling a charter train to the Strasburg station for the Baltimore chapter of the National Railway Historical Society (NRHS). The locomotive was subsequently retired from service, since its flue time had expired, and the SRC had no interest in overhauling it.

=== Disposition ===
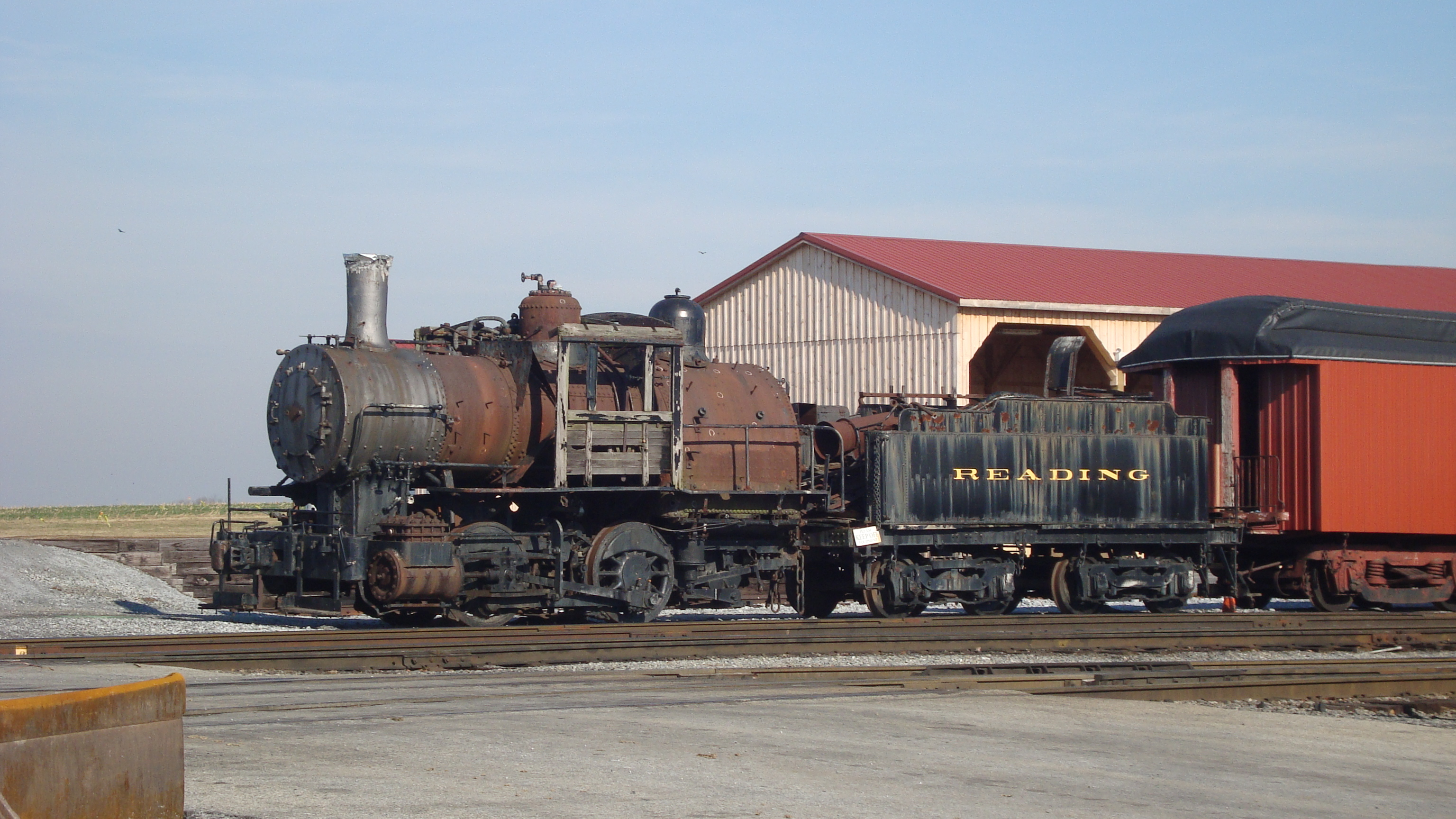
No. 1187 stripped off in the Strasburg Railroad yard siding on December 1, 2013

The locomotive subsequently spent the next decade on outdoor display outside of the SRC's yard, and at some point, in the 1980s, the locomotive was repainted to its original Reading livery as No. 1187, but it still retained the red cab roof and the SRR egg-shaped numberplate. It was subsequently on display at the Railroad Museum of Pennsylvania (RRMPA) on the other side of Gap Road from the SRC. In the early 2000s, No. 1187 was moved back to the SRC yard, since the locomotive was beginning to deteriorate, and the RMOP felt it was no longer presentable for display. By the end of the 2010s, No. 1187 had been facing an uncertain future after spending several years being exposed to the outdoor elements, and the SRC made a decision to put the locomotive up for sale.

On July 15, 2020, the Age of Steam Roundhouse (AOSR) made an offer with the SRC and purchased No. 1187 at an undisclosed cost. The locomotive was subsequently moved onto a flatbed to be hauled by truck, and on August 3, the locomotive arrived at the AOSR's location in Sugarcreek, Ohio, where it is now on display and has been cosmetically restored.
