= Erie L-1 =

Class of American steam locomotive

Erie L-1 class
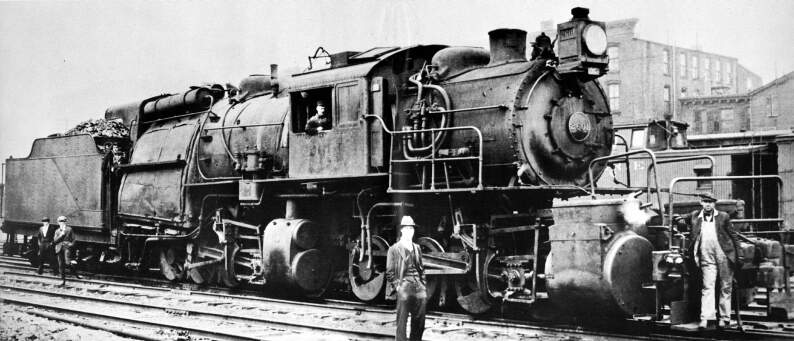
- L-1 #2601 at Port Jervis, New York, June 1911.
Type and origin
- Power type: Steam
- Builder: American Locomotive Company
- Build date: 1907
- Total produced: 3
Specifications
- Configuration
  - Whyte: 0-8-8-0
  - UIC: D′D n4v
- Gauge: 4 ft 8 1/2 in (1,435 mm)
- Driver dia.: 51 in (1,295 mm)
- Fuel capacity: 16 short tons (14.3 long tons; 14.5 t)
- Water cap.: 8,500 US gal (32,000 L; 7,100 imp gal)
- Boiler pressure: 215 psi (1.48 MPa)
- High-pressure cylinder: 25 in × 28 in (635 mm × 711 mm)
- Low-pressure cylinder: 28 in × 28 in (711 mm × 711 mm)
- Valve type: High pressure: Piston valves; Low pressure: Slide valves
Career
- Operators: Erie Railroad
- Class: L-1
- Numbers: 2600–2602
- Retired: 1930
- Disposition: All scrapped

The three L-1 0-8-8-0 Mallet steam locomotives of the Erie Railroad, built in July 1907 by ALCO, and numbered 2600, 2601 and 2602 (ALCo construction numbers 42269, 42270 and 42271 respectively); were unique in that they were the only articulated camelback locomotives ever built as well as being the first 0-8-8-0 type locomotives ever built.

When built in 1907, they were the largest steam locomotives in the world, weighing 410,000 pounds (180 long tons; 200 short tons). The L-1 Class was also called the "Angus" Type in homage to Angus Sinclair (which the 0-8-8-0 type is named), who was the publisher of Railway & Locomotive Engineering, a leading trade journal. A rarely seen photograph of #2602 shows his name under the windows on the cab sides.

The use of an intercepting valve allowed the locomotive to be used in simple or single expansion steam capacity. This meant that if desired, high pressure steam could be supplied to the front and rear cylinder groups for additional power at the cost of exhausting the boiler of steam pressure more quickly.

These locomotives were built as pushers for the heavy grades of the Erie Railroads' Susquehanna Division over Gulf Summit on the Pennsylvania and New York State border; and these locomotives primarily operated between Port Jervis, NY, and Susquehanna, PA.

== Two doors, one fireman ==
The L-1s were fired by one fireman. Most camelback locomotives have large Wootten fireboxes that burn anthracite coal. Anthracite, is harder and slower burning than bituminous coal, so a larger grate area is needed to achieve the same amount of heating.

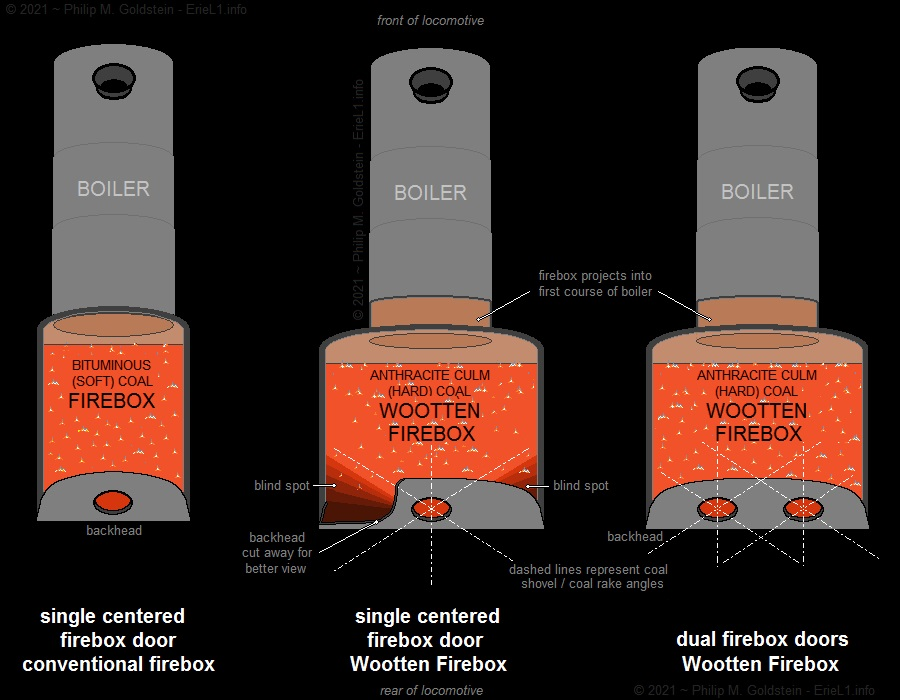

== Baldwin Locomotive Works rebuild ==
In 1921 the locomotives were sent out by Erie to be rebuilt by Baldwin Locomotive Works, as 2-8-8-2s with more conventionally rear located cabs, Standard DuPont Type B automatic mechanical stokers, Schmidt Type A superheaters, and Elasco feedwater heaters to make them more efficient. The valves on the front cylinders were changed from slide valves to piston valves.

The L-1's were retired in December 1930 and subsequently scrapped.
