= E2 class =

E2 class or Class E2 may refer to:

- E2-class Melbourne tram
- LB&SCR E2 class, 0-6-0T steam locomotives
- Pennsylvania Railroad class E2, 4-4-2 steam locomotives
