= Pennsylvania Railroad 7002 =

Preserved PRR E7s class 4-4-2 locomotive

Coordinates: 39°58′56″N 76°9′40″W

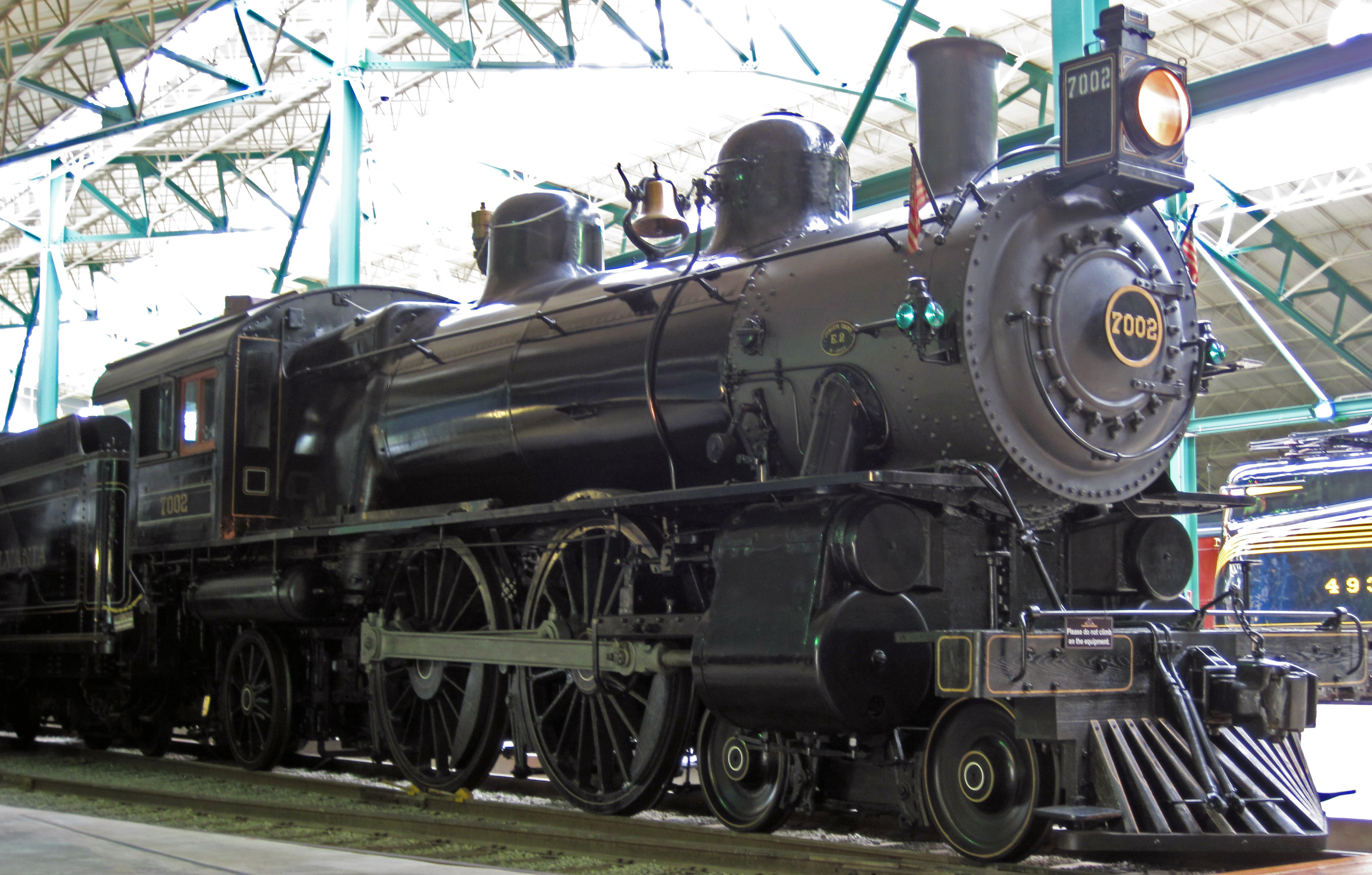
- PRR No. 7002 on static display at the Railroad Museum of Pennsylvania
Type and origin
- Power type: Steam
- Builder: Altoona Works, Altoona, Pennsylvania
- Serial number: 929
- Build date: August 1902
Specifications
- Configuration
  - Whyte: 4-4-2
- Gauge: 4 ft 8 1/2 in (1,435 mm)
- Driver dia.: 80 in (2,032 mm)
- Length: 68 ft 6 in (20.9 m)
- Adhesive weight: 127,200 lb (57,700 kg)
- Loco weight: 175,400 lb (79,600 kg)
- Tender weight: 72,350 lb (32,820 kg)
- Fuel type: Coal
- Boiler pressure: 205 psi (1,413 kPa)
- Heating surface
  - Firebox: 187 sq ft (17 m^{2})
- Superheater
  - Heating area: 412 sq ft (38 m^{2})
- Cylinders: Two, outside
- Valve gear: Stephenson
- Valve type: Piston valves
- Loco brake: Air
- Train brakes: Air
- Couplers: Knuckle
Performance figures
- Tractive effort: 27,419 lbf (122 kN)
- Factor of adh.: 4.64
Career
- Operators: Pennsylvania Railroad; Strasburg Rail Road (leased from 1982–1989)
- Class: E7s (8063); E2 (7002)
- Numbers: PRR 8063; PRR 7002
- Retired: 1939 (revenue service); December 20, 1989 (excursion service)
- Restored: July 28, 1983
- Current owner: Pennsylvania Historical and Museum Commission
- Disposition: On static display
U.S. National Register of Historic Places
- Official name: Passenger Locomotive No. 7002
- Designated: December 17, 1979
- Part of: MPS Pennsylvania Railroad Rolling Stock Thematic Resource
- Reference no.: 79002275

Pennsylvania Railroad 7002 is a preserved E7 class 4-4-2 "Atlantic" type steam locomotive built for the Pennsylvania Railroad by their own Altoona Works in August 1902. Today, it is on display at the Railroad Museum of Pennsylvania outside of Strasburg, Pennsylvania. Originally No. 8063, the PRR renumbered it to No. 7002 after the original, claimed to be a land-speed-record-setter, was scrapped. It is the only survivor of its class and was listed on the National Register of Historic Places on December 17, 1979.

== History ==
=== Revenue service ===
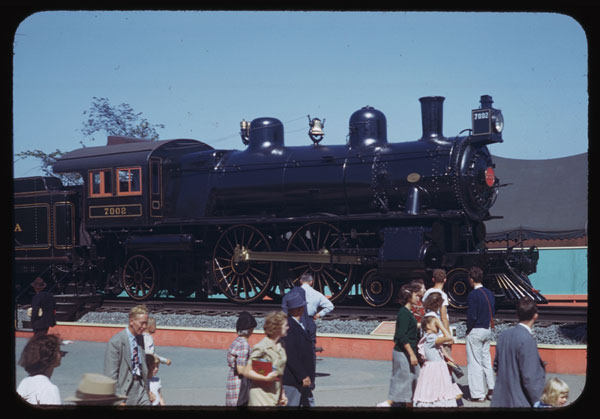
No. 7002 on display at Railfair in Chicago in 1949

The E7s-class was created by replacing the slide valves above the cylinders on the E2a, E2b and E2c-classes with piston valves. Unlike the E2, the E2a, b, c and subsequent E7s class used Belpaire firebox instead of a "radial stay" firebox. The original No. 7002 was an E2-class locomotive built in August 1902 by the Pennsylvania Railroad's Altoona Works in Altoona, Pennsylvania. On June 15, the PRR inaugurated its new 18-hour train service from New York City to Chicago, the Pennsylvania Special-forerunner to the famed Broadway Limited. No. 7002 was coupled to the train as the replacement locomotive in Crestline, Ohio. Delays east of Mansfield caused it to depart Crestline 25 minutes late.

No. 7002 was claimed to have achieved 127.1 miles per hour (204.5 km/h) near Elida but this speed was based solely on two passing times recorded by separate observers at two different points (AY Tower and Elida) just 3 miles apart, and it is difficult to obtain even a general indication of a train's speed from signal box registers (Speed on the East Coast Main Line p 69, by P Semmens). The train arrived on time in Fort Wayne, Indiana. It was scrapped in 1935. No. 8063 was an E2a-class also built in 1902 by the Altoona Works. It was upgraded to the E7s-class in 1916, the engine was retired in 1939.

No. 8063 was renumbered, rebuilt and altered to resemble No. 7002 and placed on exhibit as the "world's fastest steam engine" at the 1939 New York World's Fair and the Chicago Railroad Fair in 1948–49.

No. 7002 was transferred to the Railroad Museum of Pennsylvania from the Pennsylvania Railroad's historical collection in Northumberland, Pennsylvania in December 1979 by the Pennsylvania's successor Penn Central. On December 17, 1989, No. 7002 was listed on the National Register of Historic Places.

=== Excursion service ===
In 1982, the locomotive was leased by the Strasburg Rail Road to haul their tourist excursion trains, mostly as a stand-in for Canadian National 89, which spent the majority of the 1980s undergoing a major rebuild. On July 28, 1983, No. 7002 was returned to service. While it was restored to operate on the SRC's line, it did have a few mainline outings, most of which were doubleheader runs with D16sb No. 1223, another PRR locomotive on lease. On June 13, 1987, No. 7002 hauled a special train to celebrate the 85th anniversary of the Broadway Limited; No. 1223 was present at the same event. On November 19, 1988, No. 7002 made a special run to commemorate the 125th anniversary of Abraham Lincoln's trip over the same route to make the Gettysburg Address.

No. 7002 made its last run on December 20, 1989. In early 1990, Nos. 7002 and 1223 each underwent an annual inspection procedure, and they both passed a hydrostatic test. But an ultrasound testing device that SRC had acquired revealed numerous thin spots in the metal sides of the locomotives' firebox walls, rendering them unsafe to operate. SRC then decided to permanently retire both locomotives from service, since the required firebox repairs would have devalued their historical fabric, which the Railroad Museum of Pennsylvania wished to retain. SRC also cited that the repairs would have been too costly for locomotives they did not own. The railroad later acquired Norfolk and Western 475 as a replacement in their operations.

=== Disposition ===
In early March 1990, the two PRR locomotives were moved across the street to the museum for the final time by SRC's GE 44-ton switcher. On June 4, 2010, Nos. 7002 and 1223 were “fired up” for a photo event. Since then, No. 7002 has sat on display at the entrance to the museum’s Rolling Stock Hall pilot-to-pilot with No. 1223.

== Notes ==
a. The record was never verified and was often disputed. The New York Times believed the claims to have been exaggerated with the speed being closer to, a still respectable, 70–80 miles per hour (110–130 km/h).

== Sources ==
- Alexander, Larry (December 12, 2003). "Take a railway trip to New York, circa 1939". Happenings. Lancaster, Pennsylvania: Lancaster Newspapers: 8, 12.
- Hart, George M; Zacher, Susan M (March 1978). "Pennsylvania Railroad Rolling Stock Thematic Resource" (PDF). National Register of Historic Places Inventory—Nomination Form.
- Ledbetter, Erik (May 2008). "Lessons from the Strasburg at 50" (PDF). Trains: 40–47. Archived from the original (PDF) on December 8, 2008.
- Watt, William J (1999). The Pennsylvania Railroad in Indiana. Bloomingtion, IN: Indiana University Press. ISBN 0-253-33708-9.
- Moedinger, William (1983). The Road To Paradise. Strasburg Rail Road.
