= 0-8-8-0 =

Articulated locomotive wheel arrangement

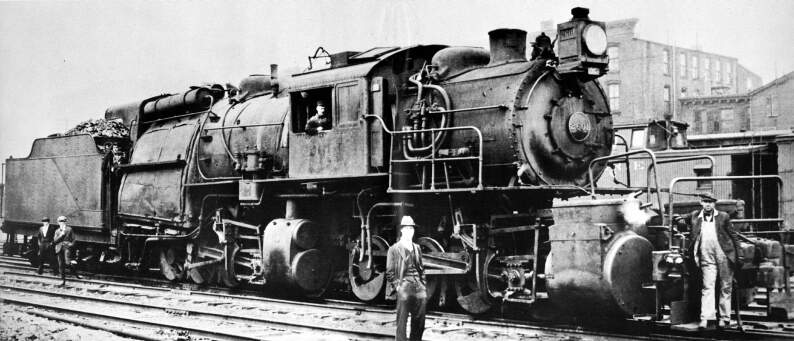
The Erie L-1s were camelback 0-8-8-0s

In the Whyte notation for classifying the wheel arrangement of steam locomotives, an 0-8-8-0 is a locomotive with two sets of eight driving wheels and neither leading wheels nor trailing wheels. Two sets of driving wheels would give far too long a wheelbase to be mounted in a fixed locomotive frame, so all 0-8-8-0s have been articulated locomotives of the Mallet type, whether simple or compound. In the UIC classification, this arrangement would be, refined to Mallet locomotives, (D)D. The type was sometimes called Angus in North America.

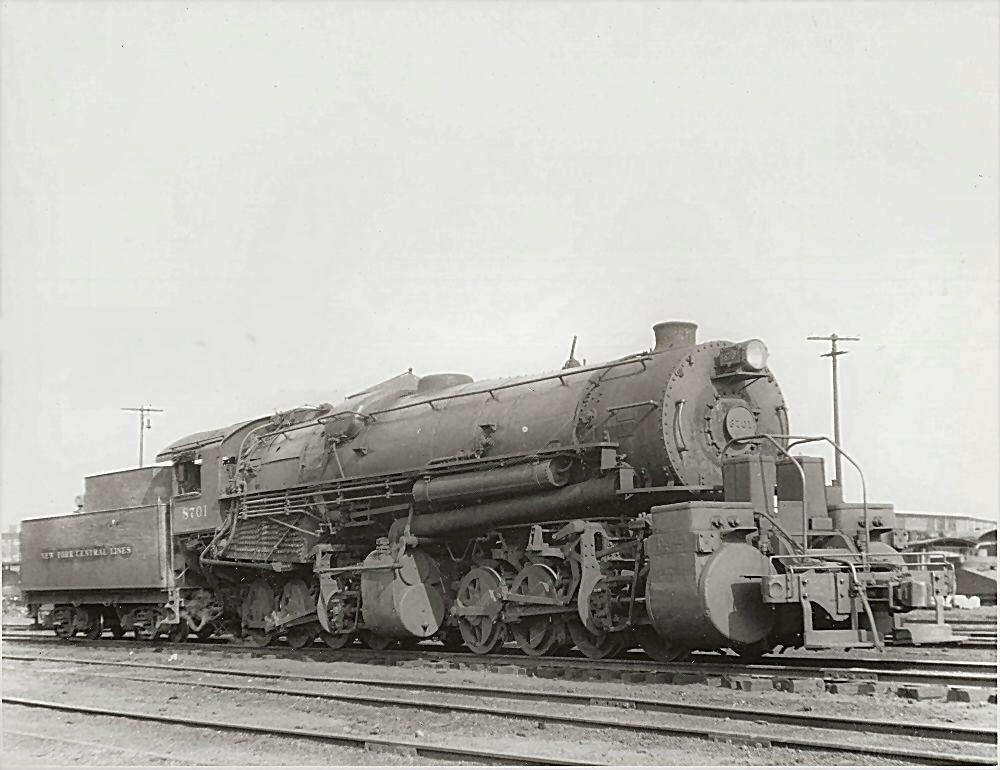
0-8-8-0 No. 8701 of the New York Central Railroad at Detroit, Michigan in 1921. This is a transfer locomotive.

Other equivalent classifications are:

UIC classification: D′D
French classification: 040+040
Turkish classification: 44+44
Swiss classification: 4/4+4/4

The lack of leading and trailing wheels to assist the tracking and stability of the locomotive means that the 0-8-8-0 type is not suited to high speeds. The vast majority were used as very heavy switcher locomotives (generally for hump yard work), transfer switchers for hauling cuts of cars between rail yards, or pusher engines for assistance on grades.

Most locomotives of this arrangement were built and served in North America, but there were exceptions. The Bavarian State Railways (K.Bay.St.B) built a total of 25 0-8-8-0T tank locomotives of class Gt 2×4/4 between 1913 and 1923, classified after unification of Germany's railway systems as class 96. These worked trains over heavily graded stretches of line, mostly as bankers (US: helpers/pushers) and were the largest locomotives in Europe when introduced.

== Popular culture ==
O gauge models of Erie class L-1 Camelback locomotives been made by both MTH Electric Trains and Sunset Models.

O gauge models of PRR Class CC2 0-8-8-0s were made by Lionel

HO scale brass importers of the L-1 Camelback locomotives include NJ Custom Brass and Overland Models.

The Bavarian locomotives have been modelled in HO gauge by Marklin/Trix and by Rivarossi.

== See also ==
- Erie L-1 - the only articulated camelback locomotive
