= Pennsylvania Railroad class D16 =

Class of American 4-4-0 locomotive

PRR D16sb
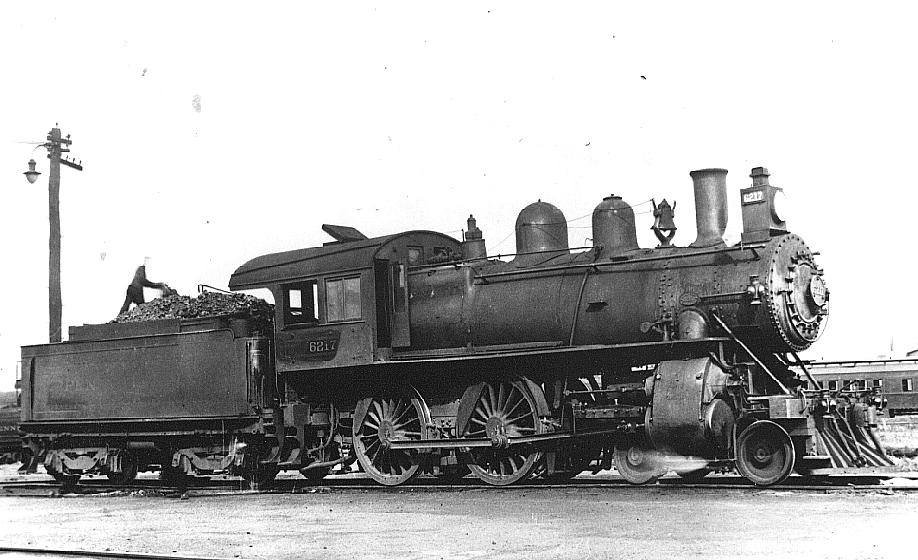
- PRR D16sb 4-4-0 6217 in Olean, NY
Type and origin
- Power type: Steam
- Designer: Theodore N. Ely, Axel S. Vogt, Frank D. Casanave
- Builder: PRR Juniata Shops
- Model: D16sb
- Build date: 1895–1910
- Total produced: 426
Specifications
- Configuration
  - Whyte: 4-4-0
  - UIC: 2′B
- Gauge: 4 ft 8 1/2 in (1,435 mm) standard gauge
- Leading dia.: 36 in (914 mm)
- Driver dia.: 68 in (1,727 mm)
- Wheelbase: 22 ft 9.5 in (6.95 m)
- Length: 62 ft 5 3/8 in (19.03 m)
- Height: 14 ft 5 1/2 in (4.41 m)
- Axle load: 51,800 lb (23.5 tonnes)
- Adhesive weight: 98,500 lb (44.7 tonnes)
- Loco weight: 141,100 lb (64.0 tonnes)
- Fuel type: Coal
- Fuel capacity: 26,000 lb (11.8 tonnes)
- Water cap.: 5,600 US gal (21,200 L)
- Firebox
  - Grate area: 33.23 sq ft (3.09 m^{2})
- Boiler pressure: 175 lbf/in^{2} (1.21 MPa)
- Heating surface
  - Firebox: 181 sq ft (16.82 m^{2})
  - Tubes and flues: 1,219 sq ft (113.25 m^{2})
- Superheater
  - Type: Schmidt
  - Heating area: 253 sq ft (23.50 m^{2})
- Cylinders: Two, outside
- Cylinder size: 20.5 in × 26 in (521 mm × 660 mm)
- Valve gear: Stephenson
- Valve type: Piston valves
- Loco brake: Air
- Train brakes: Air
- Couplers: Knuckle
Performance figures
- Tractive effort: 23,900 lbf (106.31 kN)
- Factor of adh.: 4.1
Career
- Disposition: No. 1223 on display, remainder scrapped

Class D16 on the Pennsylvania Railroad was their final development of the 4-4-0 "American" type of steam locomotive. A total of 429 of these locomotives were built at the PRR's Juniata Shops, spread across five subclasses; some had 80 in (2,030 mm) diameter driving wheels for service in level territory, while others had 68 in (1,730 mm) drivers for mountainous terrain. In the pre-1895 scheme, these locomotives were second class L.

Construction continued until 1910, and the locomotives, aided by a rebuild program from 1914, remained in service in large numbers until the 1930s, a small number surviving into the 1940s. One locomotive, #1223, was preserved and is currently on display.

== Design ==
These locomotives were originally conceived as an enlargement of the earlier class P (later reclassified D14) and were an extremely large and powerful locomotive for the period. Breaking with the traditional 4-4-0 layout with a low-slung boiler and the firebox between the frames, the class L design had a large Belpaire firebox above the frames and a large high-mounted boiler. The high center of gravity proved to offer an exceptional high-speed ride.

The design was the product of three men; general superintendent of motive power Frank D. Casaneve, chief mechanical engineer Axel S. Vogt, and chief of motive power Theodore N. Ely, Casaneve supervising the overall design, Vogt perfecting the mechanical details and Ely paying more attention to the appearance and external detail.

Two versions were conceived, reflecting the variety of terrain the PRR traversed; a high-drivered version for flat terrain with 80 in (2,030 mm) wheels and a low-drivered version for hilly terrain with 68 in (1,730 mm) wheels. The versions had tractive effort ratings of 17,500 lbf (77.84 kN) and 20,600 lbf (91.63 kN), respectively. In the reclassification of 1895, the 68-inch drivered locomotives became class D16 and the 80-inch became D16a.

== Production ==
Seventy-three of the high-drivered D16a subclass were built between 1895 and 1898, and six of class D16 in 1896. A slightly revised low-drivered subclass D16b was constructed to the tune of 262 examples between 1900 and 1908, as well as 12 high-drivered D16c in 1900 and 45 high-drivered D16d between 1900 and 1910.

As the American (4-4-0) type was displaced from top-flight service to secondary duties, tractive effort became more important than top speed. Large numbers of the high-drivered locomotives were converted to low-drivered; 76 D16a and D16c were converted to subclass D16, while 9 of class D16d were converted to D16b specification; this left only a small number of locomotives with 80-inch drivers.

== Rebuilds ==
In 1914, the PRR experimentally rebuilt D16b #178 in the Altoona Shops, giving it a superheater for greater power and efficiency. This necessitated replacing the slide-valve equipped cylinders, the lubrication of which was incompatible with the hotter, dryer superheated steam, with piston valves and slightly larger cylinders. Steam pressure was reduced by 10 psi (0.7 bar) to 175 psi (12.07 bar). Tractive effort increased to 23,900 lbf (106.31 kN) from 20,600 lbf (91.63 kN). The rebuilt locomotive was classified D16sb, the "s" referring to superheat.

The conversion proving a success, over the next few years 241 locomotives of various D16 sub-classes were converted to D16sb configuration, with 68-inch drivers. In addition, a number of high-drivered locomotives were rebuilt; these were classified D16sd.

== Later career ==
Even by the early 1900s the 4-4-0 type was becoming eclipsed by larger types such as 4-4-2 "Atlantics" in top-flight service, and the D16 locomotives became stalwarts on more pedestrian services; slower trains, locals, branch line service, and commuter services. The rebuilds to D16sb and D16sd gave them a new lease of life in such service, and even by December 1929 there were still 143 examples in operation, mostly in the Eastern and Central Regions. A pair (1033 and 2082) were sold to the small Kishacoquillas Valley Railroad in Belleville, Pennsylvania and lasted in service until the KVRR's closure in 1940. The quantities in service with the PRR dwindled progressively as train lengths increased and newer locomotives trickled down, especially with the reduced traffic of Depression years and with steam locomotives made surplus by the railroad's electrification projects.

== Last survivors ==
The last of the PRR's American types were found on the branch lines of the Delmarva Division, on the Delmarva Peninsula, encompassing parts of the U.S. states of Maryland, Delaware and Virginia. Three locomotives were left at the beginning of World War II, numbers 1035, 1223 and 5079; of these, only 1223 retained its slatted passenger pilot. This locomotive, a 1905 product of the Juniata Shops, was selected by the railroad for preservation as a historic artifact and was stored at Wilmington, Delaware until 1951, following which it was placed in the PRR's historic collection in the roundhouse at Northumberland, Pennsylvania. In 1953, the last of the D16s were retired.

== Strasburg Railroad ==
In 1960, the 1223 was leased and transferred to the Strasburg Rail Road, a tourist line in the Amish hamlet of Strasburg, Pennsylvania, where it was returned to operating condition. It operated tourist trains there until 1989, successively leased by the PRR, its successor Penn Central from 1968, and the Railroad Museum of Pennsylvania from 1979. While in operation, it had Strasburg Railroad lettering on both cab sides below the number.

== Railroad Museum of Pennsylvania ==
Survivor D16sb #1223 is now a restored static exhibit indoors at the Railroad Museum of Pennsylvania, near Strasburg and directly across the street from the Strasburg Rail Road on which it operated for many years.
