= Pennsylvania Railroad class E2, E3, and E7 =

Pennsylvania Railroad E7s
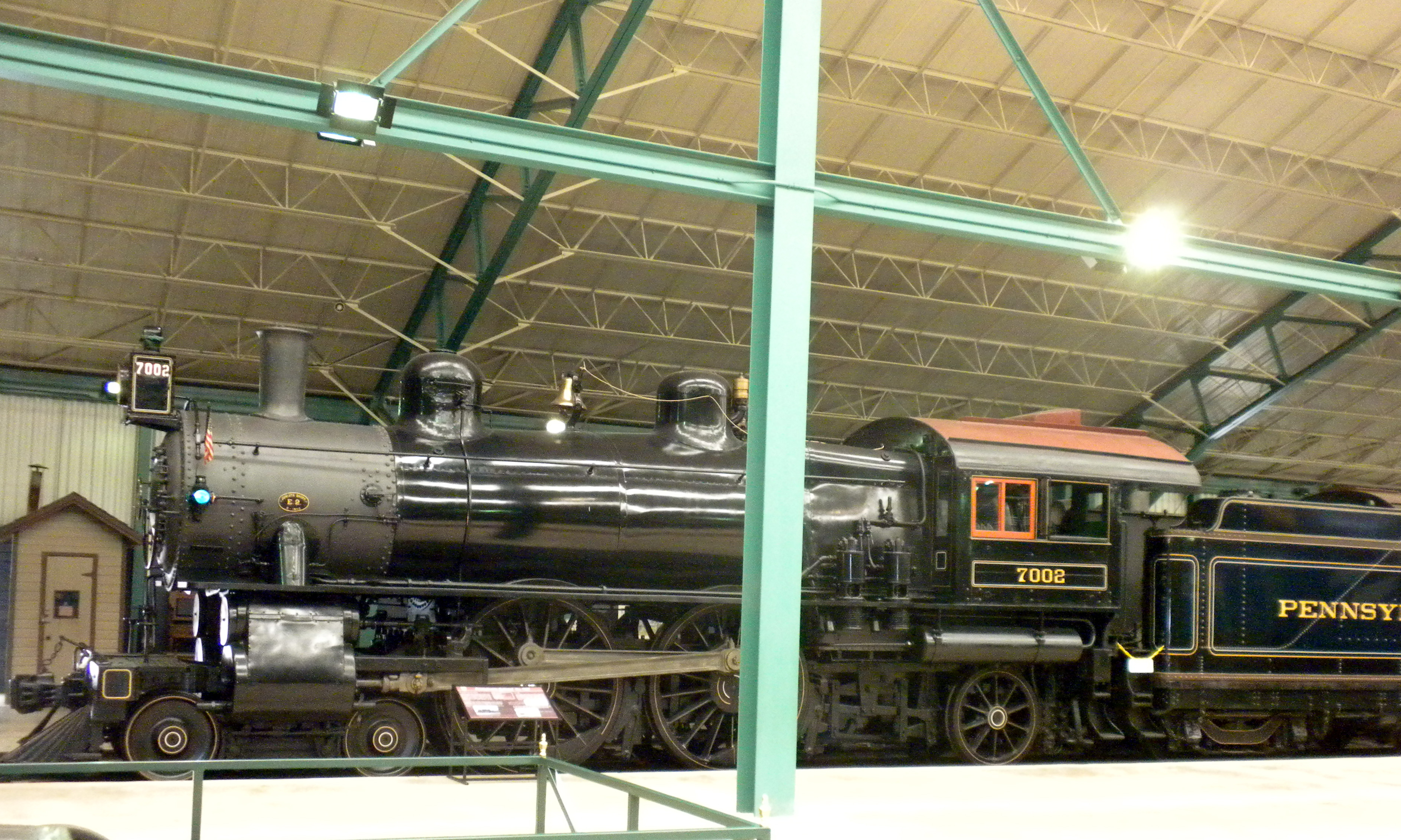
- PRR 7002 on display at the Railroad Museum of Pennsylvania
Type and origin
- Power type: Steam
- Builder: Altoona Works, Alco
- Build date: The rebuilding of these locomotives began in 1916
- Total produced: 90
Specifications
- Configuration
  - Whyte: 4-4-2
- Gauge: 4 ft 8 1/2 in (1,435 mm)
- Leading dia.: 36 in (910 mm)
- Driver dia.: 80 in (2,000 mm)
- Trailing dia.: 50 in (1,300 mm)
- Length: 68 ft 6 in (20.88 m) (including 55P58 tender)
- Adhesive weight: 118,400 lb (53,705.3 kg)
- Loco weight: 171,100 lb (77,609.7 kg)
- Tender weight: 89,050 lb (40,392.4 kg)
- Fuel type: Coal
- Fuel capacity: 12 t (11.8 long tons; 13.2 short tons)
- Water cap.: 5,800 US gallons (22,000 L; 4,800 imp gal)
- Firebox
  - Grate area: 55.5 sq ft (5.2 m^{2})
- Boiler pressure: 205 psi (1,410 kPa)
- Cylinders: 2
- Cylinder size: 22.5 in × 26 in (572 mm × 660 mm)
Performance figures
- Tractive effort: 27,409 lbf (121,920 N)
Career
- Preserved: One (No. 7002) preserved, remainder scrapped
- Disposition: No. 7002 on display

The Pennsylvania Railroad's class E2, E3, E7 steam locomotives were of the 4-4-2 "Atlantic" passenger type, frequently called light Atlantics after the introduction of the heavier E6 Atlantics. All were similar in size and boiler capacity but differed in firebox type, valves and valve gear and cylinder diameter. Classes E2 and E3 were built simultaneously.

Starting in 1916 a rebuilding program converted ninety class E2a, b, and c to class E7s by replacing slide valves with piston valves and increasing cylinder diameter from 20.5 to 22.5 inches (520 to 570 mm). Fourteen class E2 were similarly converted to class E7sa. Ninety class E2a,d, E3a,d were converted to class E3sd. These improvements allowed many of the engines to remain in active service into the 1930s.

The sub-classes differed as follows:

Class	Firebox	Cylinder size	Valves	Valve gear	Number built	Years built
E2	Radial-stay	20 ½” x 26”	Slide	Stephenson	88	1901-02
E2a	Belpaire	20 ½” x 26”	Slide	Stephenson	93	1902-05
E2b	Belpaire	20 ½” x 26”	Piston	Stephenson	70	1903-04
E2c	Belpaire	20 ½” x 26”	Slide	Stephenson	22	1903
E2d	Belpaire	20 ½” x 26”	Piston	Walschaerts	32	1906-08
E3	Radial-stay	22” x 26”	Slide	Stephenson	8	1901-02
E3a	Belpaire	22” x 26”	Slide	Stephenson	114	1903-05
E3d	Belpaire	22” x 26”	Piston	Walschaerts	56	1906-10
E7s	Belpaire	22 ½” x 26”	Piston	Stephenson	90 converted from E2a/b/c	1916-20
E7sa	Radial-stay	22 ½” x 26”	Piston	Stephenson	14 converted from E2	1916-20

In the first decade of the twentieth century classes E2 and E3 handled all of the fast passenger trains of the Pennsylvania Railroad. As train weights increased due to the switch to steel passenger cars and more cars per train, the “light” Atlantics were usually doubleheaded. Eventually, as Pacific class K2 and K3 became available, they were relegated to secondary service

== Engine #7002 ==
This engine was built for the Pennsylvania Railroad in 1902 as Class E2 No. 7002. On the first westward run of the Pennsylvania Special (renamed the Broadway Limited in 1912) in June 1905 the conductor clocked the train over three miles just west of Lima, Ohio in 85 seconds, at a record speed of 127.1 miles per hour (204.5 km/h) (the claim is dubious, as the train averaged about 68 mph (109 km/h) from Crestline to Fort Wayne). No. 7002 was rebuilt to class E7sa in August 1916 and scrapped in 1935.

When the PRR was looking for an E7 class locomotive for preservation, they refurbished No. 8063 (an E2a from the PRR) and substituted No. 7002’s engine number and builder’s plate. No. 8063 is a PRR E2a built in 1905. The engine was donated to Railroad Museum of Pennsylvania in 1979 and put into operating order by Strasburg Rail Road, for whom it ran until December 20, 1989, sometimes doubleheading with PRR D16 No. 1223.
