= Pennsylvania Railroad 1223 =

Preserved PRR D16sb class 4-4-0 locomotive

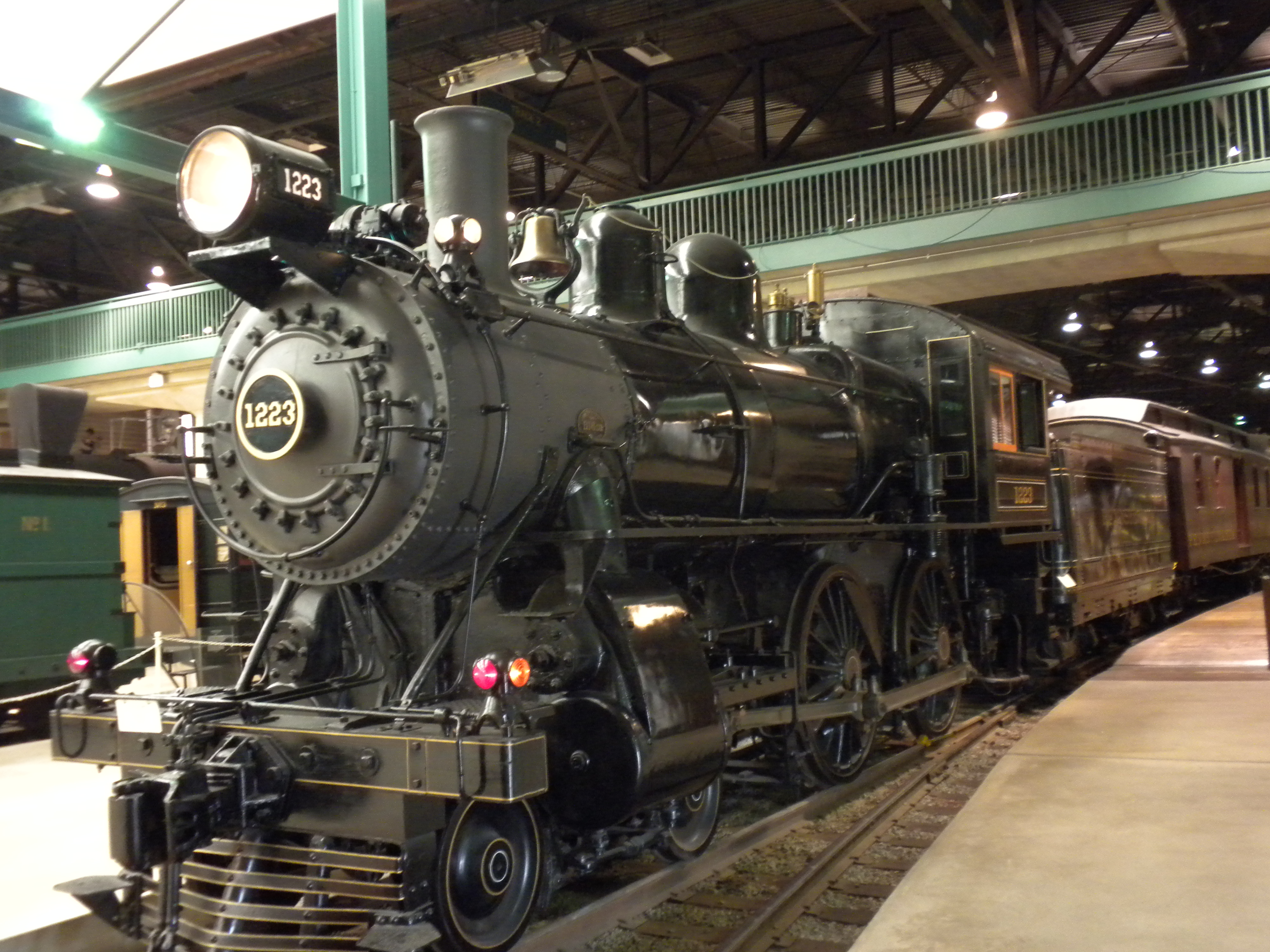
- PRR No. 1223 on static display at the Railroad Museum of Pennsylvania in March 2010
Type and origin
- Power type: Steam
- Builder: Altoona Works
- Serial number: 1399
- Build date: November 8, 1905
Specifications
- Configuration
  - Whyte: 4-4-0
- Gauge: 4 ft 8 1/2 in (1,435 mm)
- Driver dia.: 68 in (1,727 mm)
- Length: 62 ft 7 in (19 m)
- Adhesive weight: 98,500 lb (44,700 kg)
- Loco weight: 141,000 lb (64,000 kg)
- Fuel type: Coal
- Fuel capacity: 13 t (13 long tons; 14 short tons)
- Water cap.: 5,600 US gal (21,000 L; 4,700 imp gal)
- Firebox
  - Grate area: 33.2 sq ft (3.1 m^{2})
- Boiler pressure: 175 psi (1,207 kPa)
- Superheater
  - Heating area: 347 sq ft (32 m^{2})
- Cylinders: Two, outside
- Cylinder size: 20.5 in × 26 in (520 mm × 660 mm)
- Valve gear: Stephenson
- Valve type: Piston valves
- Loco brake: Air
- Train brakes: Air
- Couplers: Knuckle
Performance figures
- Tractive effort: 23,902 lbf (106 kN)
- Factor of adh.: 4.12
Career
- Operators: Pennsylvania Railroad; Tuckerton Railroad; Baltimore & Eastern Railroad Company; Strasburg Rail Road (leased from 1965–1989)
- Class: D16sb
- Numbers: PRR 1223
- Retired: 1950 (revenue service); October 26, 1989 (excursion service)
- Restored: August 14, 1965
- Current owner: Pennsylvania Historical and Museum Commission
- Disposition: On static display
- Passenger Locomotive No. 1223
- U.S. National Register of Historic Places
- Location: Railroad Museum of Pennsylvania
- Coordinates: 39°58′56″N 76°9′40″W
- MPS: Pennsylvania Railroad Rolling Stock TR
- NRHP reference No.: 79002272
- Added to NRHP: December 17, 1979

Pennsylvania Railroad No. 1223 is a preserved D16sb class 4-4-0 "American" type steam locomotive, built by the Altoona Works on November 8, 1905 for the Pennsylvania Railroad by their own Altoona Works for passenger service. After being retired from active service in 1950, the locomotive ran excursion trains on the Strasburg Rail Road in Strasburg, Pennsylvania from 1965 to 1989 when it was removed from service requiring firebox repairs. Currently, the locomotive is still on permanent static display at the Railroad Museum of Pennsylvania outside of Strasburg. It was listed on the National Register of Historic Places on December 17, 1979.

== History ==
=== Revenue service ===
The class D16 locomotives of the Pennsylvania Railroad (PRR) were the most modern of a long history of 4-4-0 type steam locomotives that the railroad used. No. 1223 was home built by PRR at its Juniata Shops in Altoona, Pennsylvania on November 8, 1905. As built, it was a high-speed passenger engine with tall driving wheels. However, the 4-4-0 type—long the mainstay of American passenger and freight service—was already becoming outmoded when No. 1223 was built, being superseded by ever-larger engines. PRR itself was pioneering steel passenger cars, which the public soon demanded for the implied increases in safety. No. 1223 was eventually rebuilt with smaller driving wheels for local freight service, having been replaced on passenger trains by engines like the class "E6" Atlantics and class "K4" Pacifics. It was modernized as well, receiving superheaters (the "s" in D-16sb), piston valves, an electric headlight and other improvements.

By 1940, most US railroads had abandoned the 4-4-0 type, but the PRR, Boston & Maine and the Canadian Pacific Railway were still using them. Nos. 1035, 1223 and 5079 were all leased to the Baltimore, Chesapeake & Atlantic Railway working such routes as the McDaniel Branch and the Love Point to Easton line. No. 1223 was scheduled for scrapping when a PRR officer noticed it and ordered renovation to almost original condition in 1937. Of the three, No. 1223 was selected for display at a number of railroad fairs in the 1930s-1950s, and eventual preservation. No. 1223 was retired from revenue service in 1950, For years, the engine was stored at a roundhouse in Northumberland, Pennsylvania.

=== Excursion service ===
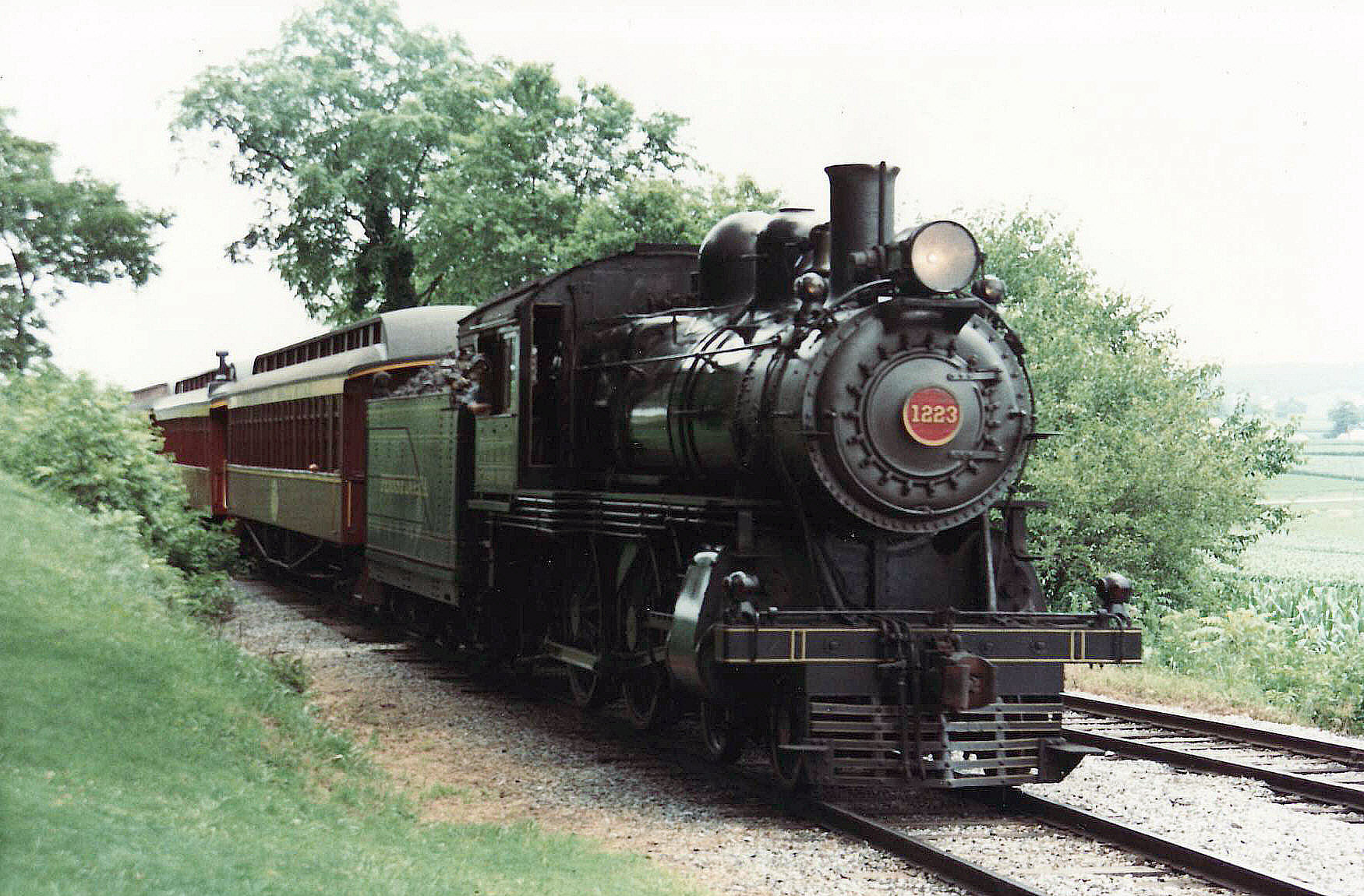
No. 1223 operating on the Strasburg Rail Road on July 30, 1989

In 1960, the Strasburg Railroad (SRC), based in Strasburg, Pennsylvania, leased No. 1223 from the PRR and restored it to operating condition on August 14, 1965. The engine pulled the Santa Claus Special at Lancaster, annually in December from 1965 to 1968.

On December 17, 1979, No. 1223 was placed on the National Register of Historic Places as "Passenger Locomotive No. 1223" by the United States Department of the Interior.

On August 1, 1983, No. 1223 was joined by 4-4-2 No. 7002, a fellow PRR locomotive, on the SRC's roster, and the two would operate some mainline doubleheaders together in 1985 and 1986. No. 1223 spent most of the 1980s pulling Strasburg's half hour trains but also made appearances at special events such as the 85th anniversary of the Broadway Limited in 1987, and an off-property trip to Delaware for Dupont in 1988. No. 1223 made its last run on October 26, 1989.

=== Disposition ===
In early 1990, Nos. 1223 and 7002 both underwent an annual inspection, and while they both passed a hydrostatic test, the SRC's newly-acquired ultrasound device revealed thin spots in both locomotives' firebox walls, and No. 1223's wrapper sheet was revealed to be worn thin. As per the Federal Railroad Administration's (FRA) updated regulations, the thin spots rendered both locomotives unsafe for operation.SRC decided against investing in the costly repairs Nos. 1223 and 7002 both required, since they did not own them, and the Railroad Museum of Pennsylvania, as the owners of both locomotives, wished to preserve their remaining historical fabric. Both locomotives were unceremoniously retired from SRC's roster in early March 1990, with their leases allowed to lapse. The railroad later acquired and restored Norfolk and Western 475 to replace them. Nos. 1223 and 7002 were moved for the final time to the Railroad Museum of Pennsylvania, and as of 2026, they remain on static display inside their exhibit hall.

== Appearances in media ==
- In 1941, the engine appeared in the film, Broadway Limited, masquerading as No. 1600.
- In 1969, the locomotive appeared in the film, Hello, Dolly, dressed as New York Central & Hudson River Railroad No. 15.

== See also ==
National Register of Historic Places listings in Lancaster County, Pennsylvania
