= Fokker D.XIV =

D.XIV
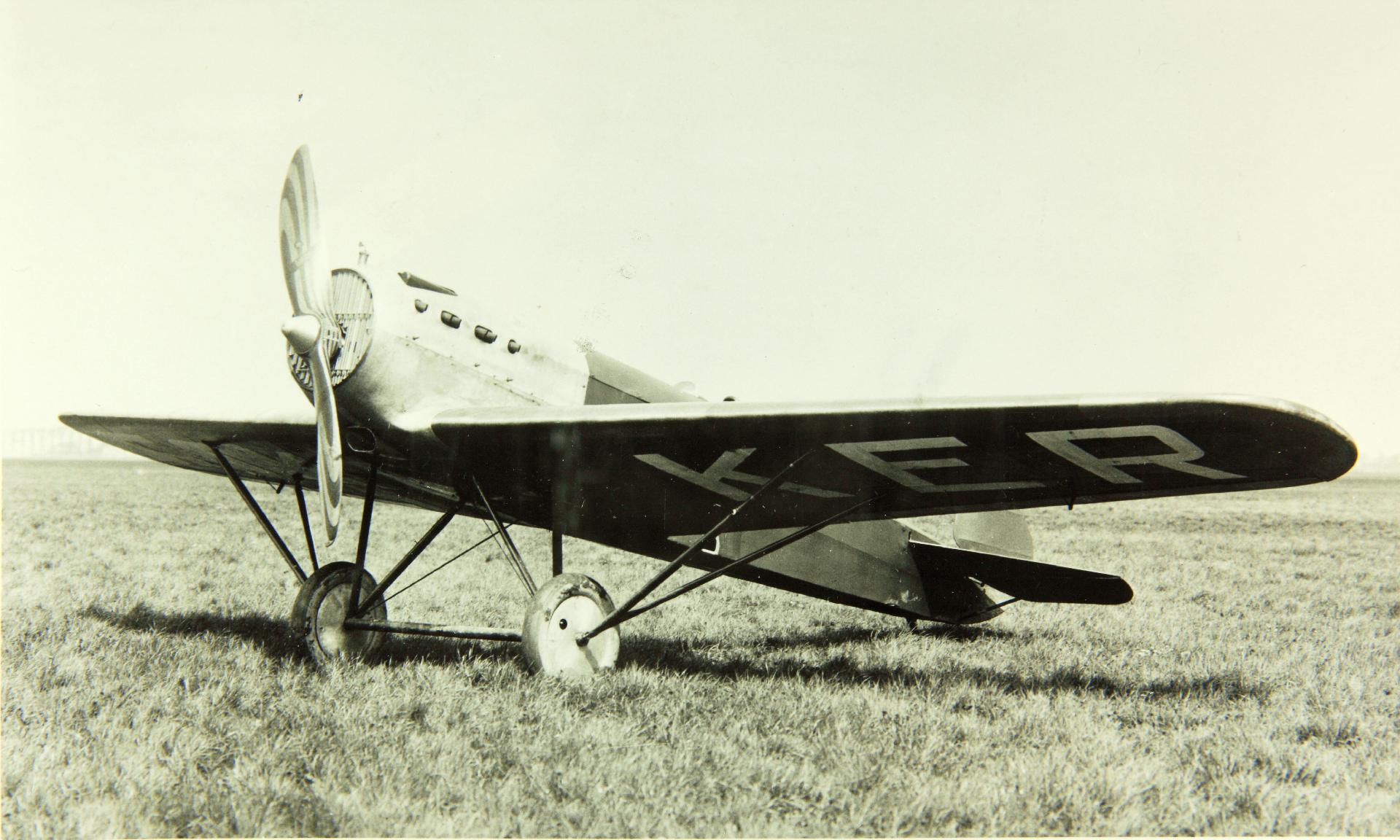

General information
- Type: Fighter
- Manufacturer: Fokker
- Number built: 1

History
- First flight: 28 March 1925

The Fokker D.XIV was a fighter aircraft developed in the Netherlands in the mid-1920s but which was only produced as a single prototype. It was a low-wing, cantilever monoplane with fixed tailskid undercarriage, the basic concept of which was derived from the Fokker V.25 that had been developed during World War I. The pilot sat in an open cockpit aft of the wing's trailing edge. Flight testing revealed excellent performance, but development was ceased when the prototype crashed, killing the test pilot.

== Specifications ==
General characteristics

- Crew: One pilot
- Length: 7.90 m (25 ft 11 in)
- Wingspan: 10.76 m (35 ft 4 in)
- Height: 3.25 m (10 ft 8 in)
- Empty weight: 950 kg (2,090 lb)
- Gross weight: 1,350 kg (2,980 lb)
- Powerplant: 1 × Hispano-Suiza 12Hb , 440 kW (590 hp)

Performance

- Maximum speed: 274 km/h (170 mph, 150 kn)
- Rate of climb: 7.1 m/s (1,400 ft/min)

Armament

- 2 × fixed, forward-firing 7.9 mm (.31 in) machine guns
