= Pennsylvania Railroad class D14 =

PRR D14
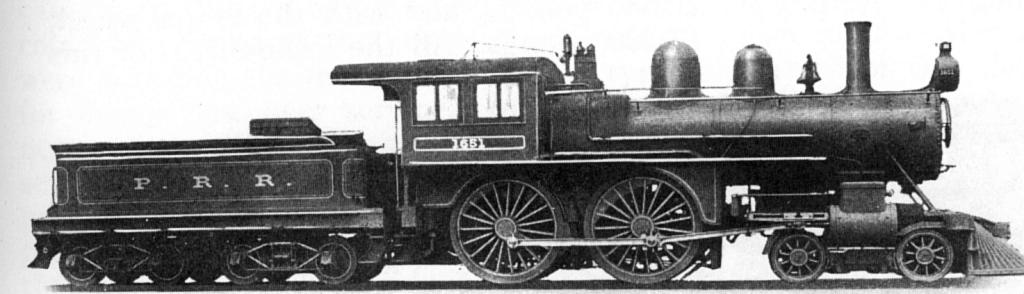
- PRR D14a #1651 in its builders’ photograph
Type and origin
- Power type: Steam
- Builder: PRR Altoona Works
- Build date: 1893–1894
- Total produced: 22
Specifications
- Configuration
  - Whyte: 4-4-0
  - UIC: 2′B
- Gauge: 4 ft 8 1/2 in (1,435 mm)
- Leading dia.: 36 in (914 mm)
- Driver dia.: 78 in (1,981 mm) (D14); 80 in (2,032 mm) (D14a); 68 in (1,727 mm) (D14b/c)
- Wheelbase: 22 ft 8 1/2 in (6.92 m)
- Length: 57 ft 6 1/4 in (17.53 m) (including tender)
- Height: 15 ft (4.57 m)
- Fuel type: Coal
- Fuel capacity: 6.8 t (15,000 lb)
- Tender cap.: 11,356 L (3,000 U.S. gal)
- Cylinders: Two, outside
- Cylinder size: 483 mm × 610 mm (19.0 in × 24.0 in)
- Valve gear: Stephenson
- Valve type: Piston valves
- Loco brake: Westinghouse air brake
- Train brakes: Westinghouse air brake
Performance figures
- Power output: 836 hp (623 kW)
- Tractive effort: 71.7 kN (16,100 lbf)
Career
- Retired: 1900-1955
- Scrapped: 1905-1955

The PRR class D14 was a 4-4-0 steam locomotive built for the Pennsylvania Railroad. They were originally designated class P in the PRR's pre-1895 classification scheme. Twenty-two locomotives were built at the PRR's Altoona Works (now owned by Norfolk Southern); six in 1893 with 78-inch (1,981 mm) driving wheels, and sixteen in 1894 with 80-inch (2,032 mm) drivers, classified D14a. Later, all sixteen class D14a were rebuilt to class D14b with 68-inch (1,727 mm) drivers for secondary service after they were replaced in top-flight express service, while three of the six class D14 were similarly rebuilt to class D14c.

== Withdrawal ==
All were withdrawn and scrapped between 1905 and 1955.
