= Wootten firebox =

Component of steam locomotives

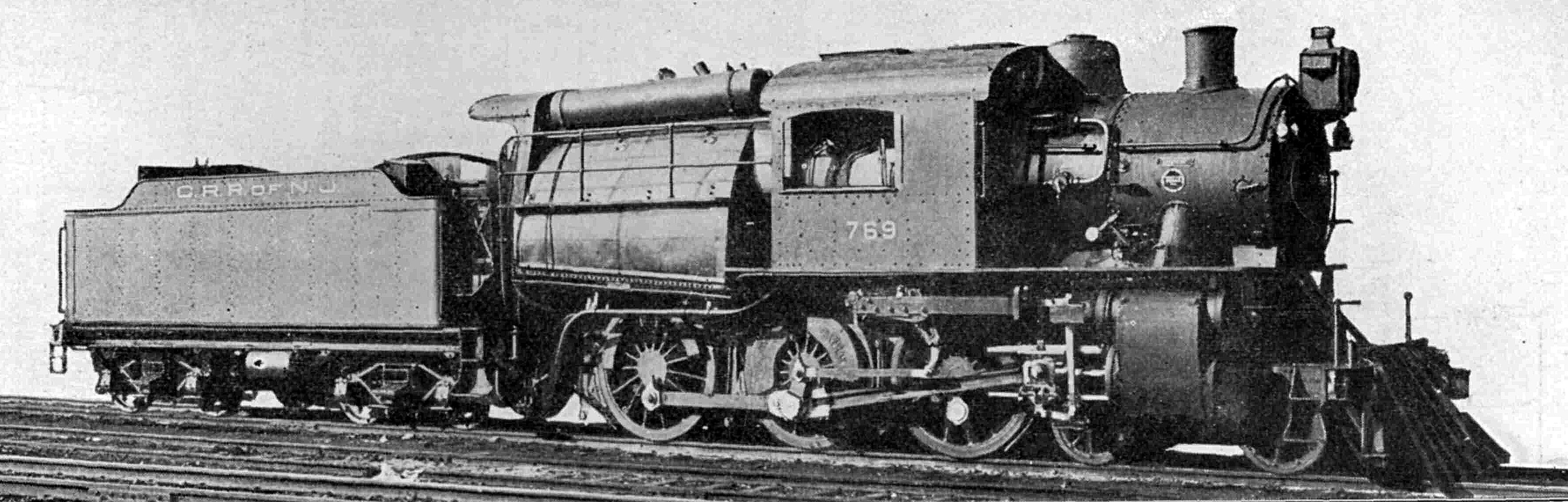
4-6-0 camelback locomotive, complete with Wootten firebox.

The Wootten firebox is a type of firebox used on steam locomotives. The firebox is very wide to allow combustion of anthracite waste, known as "culm". Its size necessitates unusual placement of the crew, examples being camelback locomotives. The Wootten firebox made for a free-steaming, powerful locomotive, and the cheap fuel burned almost smokelessly; the combination made for an excellent passenger locomotive, and many camelbacks operated in this service.

== History ==
John E. Wootten was the Superintendent of Motive Power for the then Philadelphia and Reading Railroad (later simply the Reading Railroad) from 1866, and General Manager of the system from 1876. He saw the vast spoil tips (piles of anthracite waste) in the area as a possible plentiful, cheap source of fuel if he could develop a firebox that could burn it effectively. Through experiments, he determined that a large, wide firebox with a slow firing rate worked best, with a thin layer of the fuel and moderate draft.

The typical locomotive firebox of the day was long and narrow, fitting in between the locomotive's frames. The successful design of a trailing truck with the firebox mounted behind the driving wheels (e.g. the Pacific or 4-6-2 class) not yet been developed. Wootten instead mounted his huge firebox above the locomotive's driving wheels. The problem now was that it would be impossible for the locomotive's engineer (driver) to see forwards around the firebox shoulders with a cab floor at the then-standard tender deck height. Instead, a cab for the engineer was placed above and astride the boiler. The fireman, however, remained at the rear with minimal protection from the elements.

In later years these fireboxes were adopted in several large classes of engines, particularly express passenger engines with a trailing truck, so that the large grate area could give sustained high power output using standard coal. For example, the UK LNER Class A4 locomotives, of which "Mallard" holds the world speed record for steam traction, used a wide firebox.
