= List of heritage railroads in the United States =

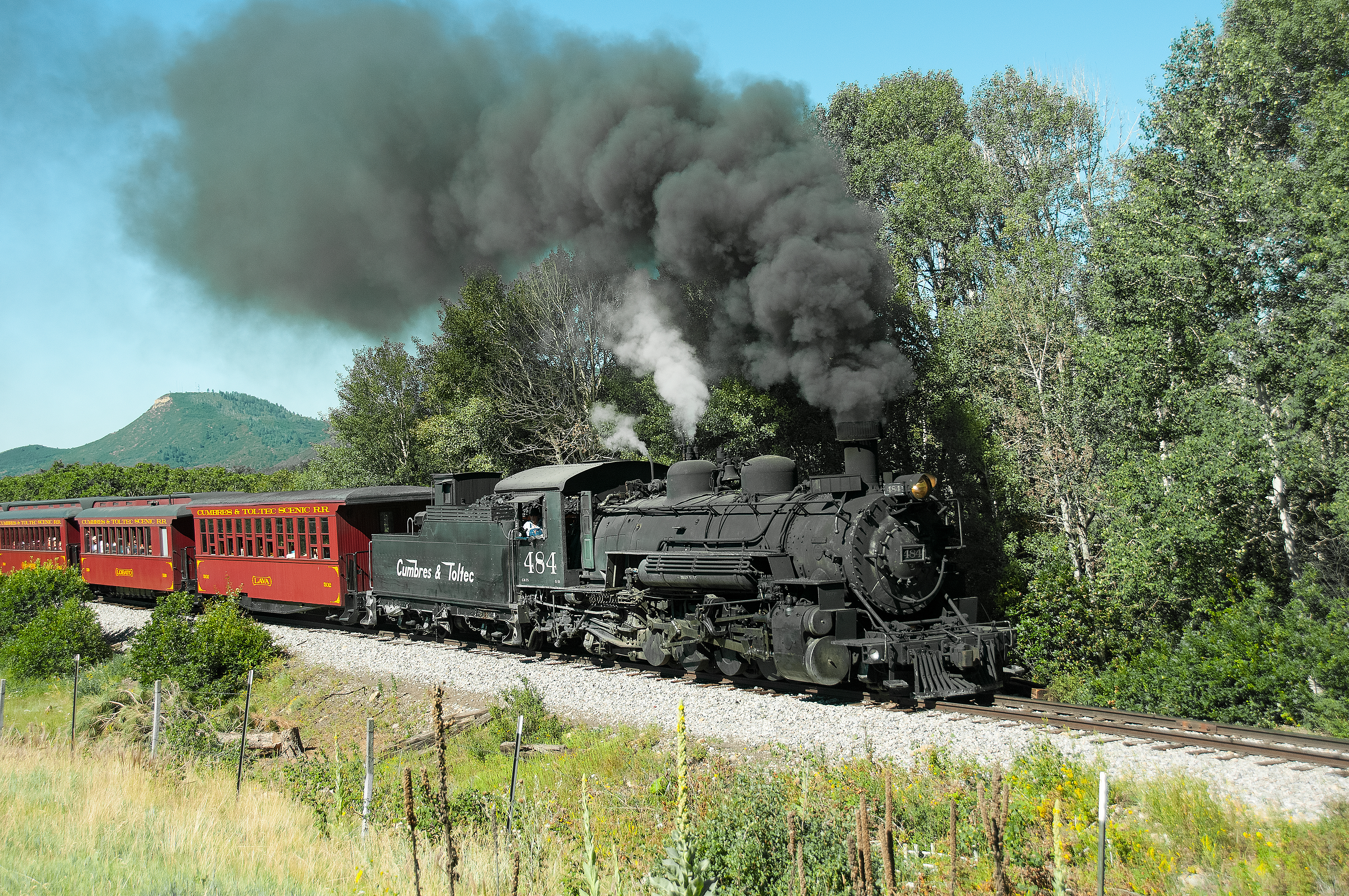
A Cumbres and Toltec Scenic Railroad train east of Chama, New Mexico

This is a list of heritage railroads in the United States; there are currently no such railroads in two U.S. states, Mississippi and North Dakota.

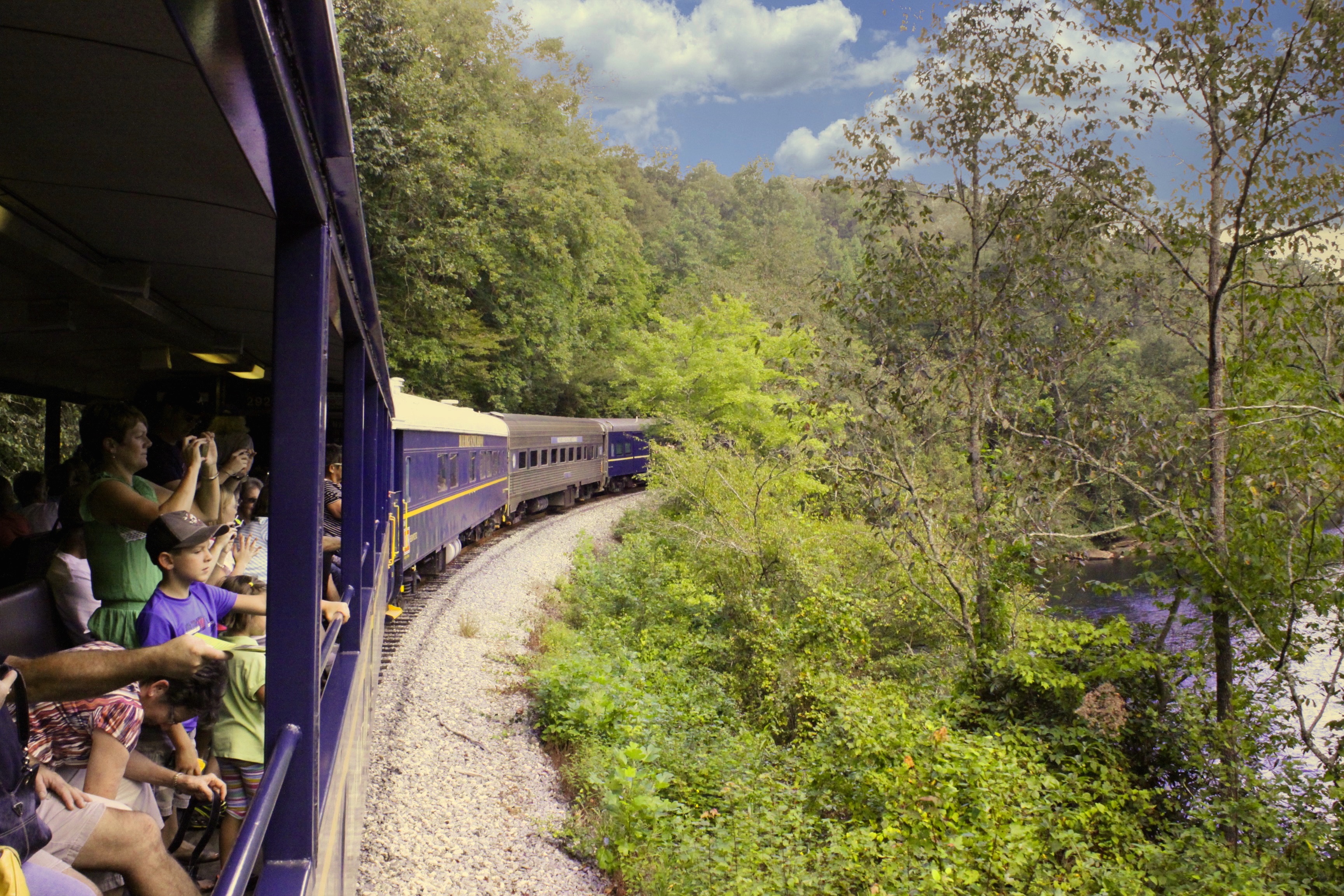
Visitors aboard the Blue Ridge Scenic Railway in Blue Ridge, Georgia

== Heritage railroads by state ==
=== Alabama ===
- Heart of Dixie Railroad Museum, Shelby & Southern Railroad and Calera & Shelby Railroad
- Mercury & Chase Railroad
- Wales West Light Railway

=== Alaska ===
- Tanana Valley Railroad Museum in Pioneer Park (1899 engine)
- White Pass and Yukon Route

=== Arizona ===
- Arizona Railway Museum (No excursions listed)
- Arizona State Railroad Museum (In planning stages)
- Grand Canyon Railway
- McCormick-Stillman Railroad Park in Scottsdale
- Old Pueblo Trolley
- Phoenix Trolley Museum, incorporated as the Arizona Street Railway Museum
- Superstition Narrow Gauge Railroad
- Verde Canyon Railroad

=== Arkansas ===
- Arkansas and Missouri Railroad
- Eureka Springs and North Arkansas Railway
- Fort Smith Trolley Museum
- Metro Streetcar

=== California ===
- Angels Flight
- Billy Jones Wildcat Railroad, uses repurposed narrow gauge steam engines and is partly the inspiration for Walt Disney's theme park, Disneyland
- Calico and Odessa Railroad
- California State Railroad Museum
- California Western Railroad, also called The Skunk Train
- Disneyland Railroad (three locomotives are historic)
- Fillmore and Western Railway - short line used by Hollywood film industry. (Lease agreement ended in 2021)
- Ghost Town & Calico Railroad in Knott's Berry Farm
- Golden Gate Railroad Museum (No excursions listed)
- Napa Valley Wine Train
- Nevada County Narrow Gauge Railroad & Transportation Museum
- Niles Canyon Railway
- Nut Tree Railroad
- Pacific Coast Railroad in Santa Margarita
- Pacific Southwest Railway Museum
- Placerville & Sacramento Valley Railroad, oldest railroad west of the Mississippi
- Port of LA Waterfront Red Car, a rebuilt part of the original Pacific Electric Railway system (Closed in 2015)
- Poway–Midland Railroad
- Sierra Railway - Railtown 1897 State Historic Park
- Red Car Trolley (Closed in 2025)
- Redwood Valley Railway
- Roaring Camp & Big Trees Narrow Gauge Railroad
- Sacramento RiverTrain
- Sacramento Southern Railroad
- San Bernardino Railroad Historical Society (For AT&SF 3751 excursion trips)
- San Diego Trolley Silver Line
- San Francisco Municipal Railway
  - E Embarcadero streetcar line
  - F Market & Wharves streetcar line
  - San Francisco cable car system
- San Jose Steam Railroad Museum (Proposed)
- San Luis Obispo Railroad Museum
- Santa Cruz, Big Trees and Pacific Railway
- Sierra Railroad
- Society for the Preservation of Carter Railroad Resources (Reconstruction of the South Pacific Coast Railroad)
- Sonoma TrainTown Railroad
- Southern California Railway Museum (Formerly known as the Orange Empire Railway Museum from 1956 to 2018)
- Western Pacific Railroad Museum
- Western Railway Museum
- Yosemite Mountain Sugar Pine Railroad

=== Colorado ===
- Cañon City & Royal Gorge Railroad LLC (DBA Royal Gorge Route Railroad)
- Colorado Railroad Museum
- Como Roundhouse, Railroad Depot and Hotel Complex
- Cripple Creek and Victor Narrow Gauge Railroad
- Cumbres and Toltec Scenic Railroad
- Denver Trolley (formerly the Platte Valley Trolley)
- Durango & Silverton Narrow Gauge Railroad Company
- Fort Collins trolley
- Georgetown Loop Railroad
- Leadville, Colorado and Southern Railroad
- Manitou and Pikes Peak Railway
- Pikes Peak Historical Street Railway Foundation
- Rio Grande Scenic Railroad (Currently in receivership)
- Ski Train (now operated by Amtrak as the Winter Park Express)
- Tiny Town Railroad

=== Connecticut ===
- Connecticut Trolley Museum
- Danbury Railway Museum
- Essex Steam Train operated by the Valley Railroad Company
- Naugatuck Railroad and Railroad Museum of New England
- Shore Line Trolley Museum

=== Delaware ===
- Wilmington and Western Railroad

=== Florida ===
- Florida Railroad Museum
- Gold Coast Railroad Museum
- Kirby Family Farm Train
- Orlando & Northwestern Railway (Closed in 2020)
- Seminole Gulf Railway
- Serengeti Express in Busch Gardens Tampa
- Sugar Express
- TECO Line Streetcar
- Tavares, Eustis & Gulf Railroad (Closed in 2017)
- Walt Disney World Railroad (four locomotives are historic)
- Wildlife Express Train at Disney's Animal Kingdom

=== Georgia ===
- Azalea Sprinter
- Blue Ridge Scenic Railway
- Chickamauga Train from Tennessee Valley Railroad Museum
- Georgia Coastal Railway
- River Street Streetcar (Out of service)
- Georgia State Railroad Museum
- SAM Shortline Excursion Train
- Six Flags Over Georgia Park Railroad in Six Flags Over Georgia
- Southeastern Railway Museum
- Stone Mountain Scenic Railroad
- Tallulah Falls Railway Museum (commemorates the Tallulah Falls Railway)
- Vulcan Steam Train

=== Hawaii ===
- Grove Farm Plantation Museum Railroad
- Hawaiian Railway
- Kauai plantation railroad
- Lahaina Ka'anapali & Pacific Railroad (Closed in 2014, currently defunct)

=== Idaho ===
- Silverwood Theme Park
- Thunder Mountain Line (Closed in 2015)

=== Illinois ===
- Fox River Trolley Museum
- Illinois Railway Museum
- Monticello Railway Museum
- Silver Creek & Stephenson Railroad

=== Indiana ===
- Fort Wayne Railroad Historical Society (For NKP 765 excursion trips, future)
- French Lick Scenic Railway
- Hesston Steam Museum (For Hesston and Galena Creek excursions)
- Hoosier Valley Railroad Museum
- National New York Central Railroad Museum
- Nickel Plate Express
- Ohio River Scenic Railway
- Whitewater Valley Railroad

=== Iowa ===
- Boone and Scenic Valley Railroad
- Fourth Street Elevator
- Midwest Central Railroad
- Midwest Electric Railway

=== Kansas ===
- Abilene and Smoky Valley Railroad
- Ottawa Northern Railroad, formerly the Midland Railway

=== Kentucky ===
- Big South Fork Scenic Railway
- Bluegrass Railroad and Museum
- Kentucky Railway Museum
- Kentucky Steam Heritage Corporation (For C&O 2716 excursion trips)
- My Old Kentucky Dinner Train (Between Bardstown station and Limestone Springs)

=== Louisiana ===
- Streetcars in New Orleans
  - Canal Streetcar Line
  - Riverfront Streetcar Line
  - St. Charles Streetcar Line
- Louisiana Steam Train Association
- Old Hickory Railroad

=== Maine ===
- Belfast & Moosehead Lake Railroad
- Boothbay Railway Village
- Downeast Scenic Railroad
- Maine Narrow Gauge Railroad Museum
- Midcoast Railservice (Coastliner); operated 2023 to 2024; replaced by Maine Switching Services in 2025
- Sandy River and Rangeley Lakes Railroad
- Seashore Trolley Museum
- Wiscasset, Waterville and Farmington Railway

=== Maryland ===
- B&O Railroad Museum
- Baltimore Streetcar Museum
- National Capital Trolley Museum
- Walkersville Southern Railroad
- Western Maryland Scenic Railroad

=== Massachusetts ===
- Berkshire Scenic Railway Museum
- Cape Cod Central Railroad
- Edaville Railroad
- Lowell National Historical Park Trolley Line
- MBTA Mattapan Trolley

=== Michigan ===
- Coopersville and Marne Railway
- Huckleberry Railroad
- Lake Linden & Torch Lake Railroad
- Little River Railroad
- Michigan Transit Museum
- Neo Wilson Memorial Railway
- Quincy and Torch Lake Cog Railway
- Southern Michigan Railroad Society
- Timbertown Railway at Michigan's Adventure
- Steam Railroading Institute
- Weiser Railroad

=== Minnesota ===
- Como-Harriet Streetcar Line
- Gopher State Railway Museum
- Excelsior Streetcar Line
- Ironhorse Central Railroad
- Lake Superior & Mississippi Railroad
- Minnesota Transportation Museum
- North Shore Scenic Railroad
- Northfield & Cannon Valley Railroad (Closed in 2007)
- Osceola and St. Croix Valley Railway

=== Mississippi ===
- Cleveland Train Museum

=== Missouri ===
- Arkansas & Missouri Railroad
- Belton, Grandview and Kansas City Railroad
- Branson Scenic Railway
- Delmar Loop Trolley
- Frisco Silver Dollar Line in Silver Dollar City
- St. Louis, Iron Mountain and Southern Railway
- Tommy G. Robertson Railroad in Six Flags St. Louis
- Worlds of Fun Park Railroad in Worlds of Fun
- Neil F. Norkaitis Demonstration Trolley Line in National Museum of Transportation
- Southwest Missouri Electric Railway Empire County Line in King Jack Park, Webb City

=== Montana ===
- Alder Gulch Shortline Railroad, in Virginia City, Montana
- Central Montana Rail, Inc.

=== Nebraska ===
- Fremont and Elkhorn Valley Railroad (Ended service)
- Nebraska Railroad Museum (In transition to move to permanent home)
- Omaha Zoo Railroad in Henry Doorly Zoo and Aquarium

=== Nevada ===
- Nevada Northern Railway
- Nevada State Railroad Museum
- Nevada Southern Railroad Museum
- Virginia and Truckee Railroad

=== New Hampshire ===
- Conway Scenic Railroad
- Plymouth & Lincoln Railroad
  - Granite State Scenic Railway (formerly known as Hobo Railroad)
  - Winnipesaukee Scenic Railroad
- Wilton Scenic Railroad
- Cafe Lafayette Dinner Train
- Mount Washington Cog Railway
- Silver Lake Railroad
- White Mountain Central Railroad

=== New Jersey ===
- Black River and Western Railroad
- Cape May Seashore Lines
- Delaware River Rail Excursions
- New Jersey Museum of Transportation
- Woodstown Central Railroad
- Whippany Railway Museum

=== New Mexico ===
- Cumbres and Toltec Scenic Railroad
- New Mexico Steam Locomotive and Railroad Historical Society (For AT&SF 2926 excursion trips)
- Sky Railway

=== New York ===
- Adirondack Railroad
- Arcade and Attica Railroad
- Buffalo Cattaraugus and Jamestown Scenic Railway
- Catskill Mountain Railroad
- Cooperstown and Charlotte Valley Railroad
- Delaware and Ulster Railroad
- Medina Railroad Museum
- New York Museum of Transportation
- New York, Susquehanna, & Western Technical and Historical Society (aka Delaware River Railroad)
- New York Transit Museum
- Railroad Museum of Long Island
- Rochester & Genesee Valley Railroad Museum
- Saratoga Corinth & Hudson Railway
- Saratoga and North Creek Railway (Closed in April 2018)
- Trolley Museum of New York
- Troy and New England Railway

=== North Carolina ===
- Craggy Mountain Line
- Great Smoky Mountains Railroad
- Handy Dandy Railroad
- New Hope Valley Railway
- North Carolina Transportation Museum
- Tweetsie Railroad

=== Ohio ===
- Age of Steam Roundhouse (Several operating steam locomotives, but no excursions listed)
- Carillon Park Railroad in Carillon Historical Park
- Cedar Point & Lake Erie Railroad in Cedar Point
- Cincinnati Union Terminal
- Cuyahoga Valley Scenic Railroad
- Hocking Valley Scenic Railway
- Kings Island & Miami Valley Railroad in Kings Island
- Lake Shore Railway Association (Lorain and West Virginia Railway)
- Lebanon Mason Monroe Railroad
- Toledo, Lake Erie and Western Railway
- Zanesville and Western Scenic Railroad

=== Oklahoma ===
- El Reno Heritage Express
- Oklahoma Railway Museum

=== Oregon ===
- Astoria Riverfront Trolley
- Eagle Cap Excursion Train
- Hood River Railroad (DBA Mount Hood Railroad)
- Oregon Coast Scenic Railroad
- Oregon Electric Railway Museum
- Oregon Pacific Railroad
- Oregon Rail Heritage Center
- Santiam Excursion Train
- Safari Village Train Ride at Wildlife Safari
- Sumpter Valley Railway
- Train Mountain Railroad
- Washington Park and Zoo Railway
- Willamette Shore Trolley

=== Pennsylvania ===
- Allentown and Auburn Railroad
- Bellefonte Historical Railroad Society
- Colebrookdale Railroad
- Dry Gulch Railroad in Hersheypark
- Duquesne Incline
- East Broad Top Railroad
- Everett Railroad
- G (SEPTA Metro)
- Horseshoe Curve Incline
- Johnstown Inclined Plane
- Kiski Junction Railroad (Operations suspended 2016)
- Lehigh Gorge Scenic Railway
- Middletown and Hummelstown Railroad
- Monongahela Incline
- New Hope Railroad (formerly the New Hope and Ivyland Railroad)
- Northern Central Railway of York
- Oil Creek and Titusville Railroad
- Pioneer Tunnel Coal Mine & Steam Train
- Railroaders Memorial Museum
- Reading Blue Mountain and Northern Railroad
- Reading Railroad Heritage Museum
- Rockhill Trolley Museum
- Steamtown National Historic Site
- Stewartstown Railroad
- The Stourbridge Line
- Strasburg Rail Road
- Tioga Central Railroad (Closed in 2019)
- Wanamaker, Kempton and Southern Railroad
- Wawa and Concordville Railroad (Closed in 1968)
- West Chester Railroad
- Westmoreland Scenic Railroad (Closed in 2004)
- Williams Grove Historical Steam Engine Association
- Quakertown and Eastern Railroad (Closed in 1970)

=== Rhode Island ===
- Newport and Narragansett Bay Railroad

=== South Carolina ===
- Rockton, Rion and Western Railroad/South Carolina Railroad Museum/Rockton and Rion Railroad Historic District

=== South Dakota ===
- Black Hills Central Railroad (DBA 1880 Train)
- Prairie Village, Herman and Milwaukee Railroad

=== Tennessee ===
- Dollywood Express in Dollywood
- Lookout Mountain Incline Railway
- MATA Trolley (Memphis)
- Southern Appalachia Railway Museum
- Tennessee Central Railway Museum
- Tennessee Valley Railroad Museum
- Three Rivers Rambler

=== Texas ===
- Austin Steam Train Association (presently runs only diesel equipment)
- CP Huntington Train at Kemah Boardwalk
- Galveston Island Trolley
- Grapevine Vintage Railroad
- Historic Jefferson Railway
- Longhorn and Western Railroad (Texas Transportation Museum)
- M-Line Trolley
- Rosenberg Railroad Museum
- Six Flags & Texas Railroad in Six Flags Over Texas
- Six Flags Fiesta Texas Park Railroad in Six Flags Fiesta Texas
- Texas Railroad Museum (Proposed)
- Texas State Railroad

=== Utah ===
- Golden Spike National Historic Site (Promontory Summit, Utah)
- Heber Valley Railroad
- Lagoon Wild Kingdom Train (Closed in 2025)

=== Vermont ===
- Green Mountain Railroad
- Steamtown, U.S.A. (Moved to Scranton, Pennsylvania as Steamtown National Historic Site)

=== Virginia ===
- Busch Gardens Railway in Busch Gardens Williamsburg
- Southwest Virginia Scenic Railroad (Closed in 1975)
- Virginia Scenic Railway (Buckingham Branch)
- James River Rambler (Buckingham Branch)
- Virginia Museum of Transportation (For N&W 611 excursion trips)

=== Washington ===
- Anacortes Railway (Defunct)
- Chehalis–Centralia Railroad
- Chelatchie Prairie Railroad
- George Benson Waterfront Streetcar Line (Closed in 2005)
- Issaquah Valley Trolley
- Inland Northwest Rail Museum
- Lake Whatcom Railway (Out of Service since 2019)
- Mt. Rainier Scenic Railroad
- Northwest Railway Museum
- Pend Oreille Valley Railroad (Ended excursion service in 2016)
- Yakima Electric Railway Museum

=== West Virginia ===
- Cass Scenic Railroad State Park
- Durbin and Greenbrier Valley Railroad
- Potomac Eagle Scenic Railroad

=== Wisconsin ===
- East Troy Electric Railroad
- Kenosha Streetcar
- Kettle Moraine Scenic Railway (Closed in October 2001)
- Lumberjack Steam Train
- Mid-Continent Railway Museum
- National Railroad Museum, Ashwaubenon (includes a small rail loop)
- Osceola and St. Croix Valley Railway
- Riverside and Great Northern Railway
- Wisconsin Great Northern Railroad

=== Wyoming ===
- Evanston Roundhouse
- Union Pacific Steam Program (Cheyenne, Wyoming)
- Wyoming Transportation Museum

=== Territories ===
Puerto Rico

- Train of the South

== See also ==
- List of heritage railways
- List of heritage railways in Canada
- List of scenic railroads
- Heritage streetcar
