= Northern Central Railway of York =

Civil-War themed heritage railroad in Pennsylvania

Coordinates: 39.74011°N 76.70065°W

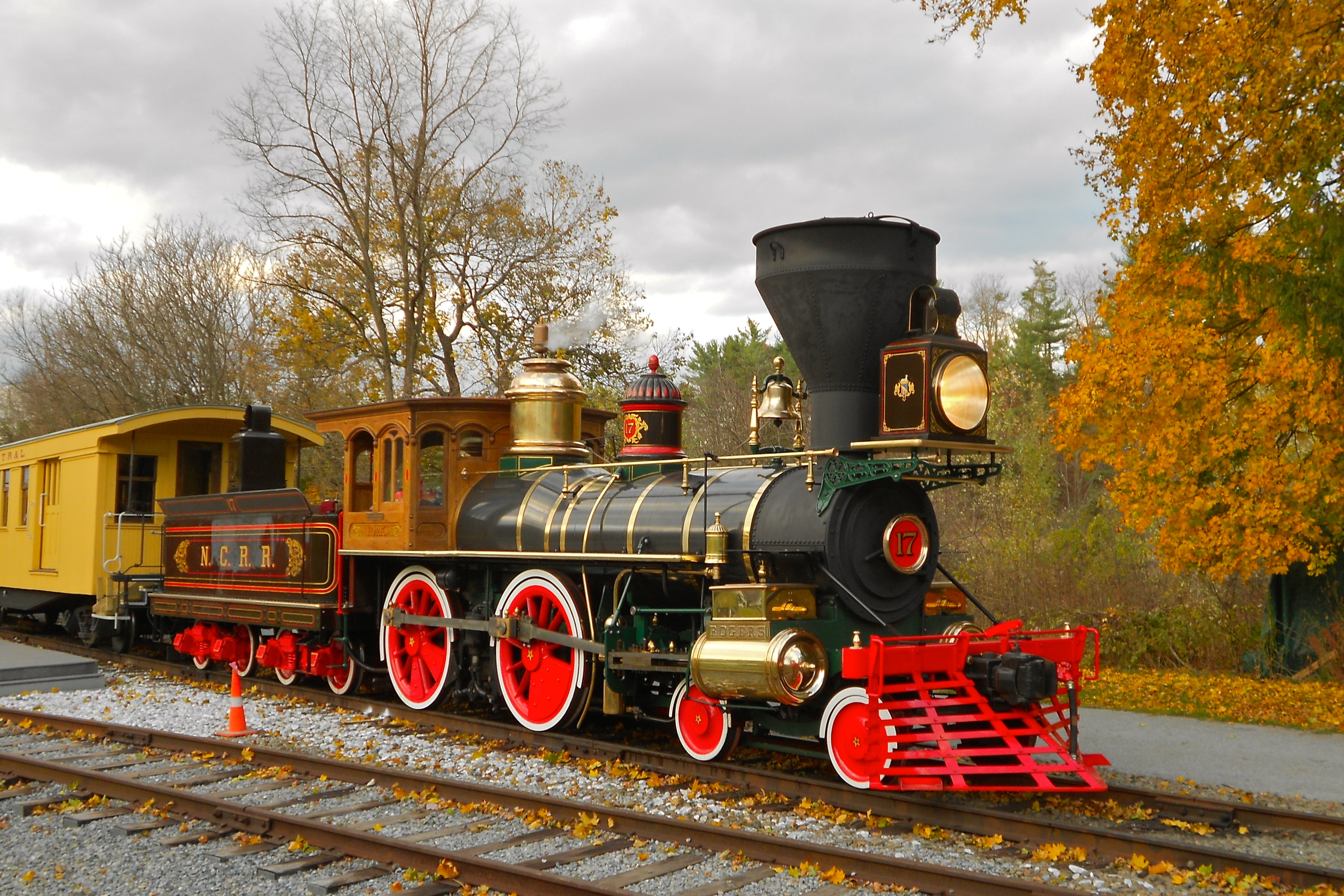
- NCRR #17 York

Overview
- Headquarters: New Freedom, Pennsylvania
- Reporting mark: NCRA
- Locale: York County, Pennsylvania
- Dates of operation: June 2013–present

Technical
- Track gauge: 4 ft 8 1/2 in (1,435 mm) standard gauge
- Length: 10 mi (16 km)

Other
- Website: northerncentralrailway.com

The Northern Central Railway of York (reporting mark NCRA) is a non-profit, Civil War themed heritage railroad based in New Freedom, Pennsylvania. A reproduction 4-4-0 steam locomotive hauls passengers over 10 miles of Northern Central Railway track between New Freedom and Hanover Junction, Pennsylvania. The operation was originally named Steam into History and held its grand opening on June 1, 2013. In 2019 it took up the historical name Northern Central Railway.

== Historical significance of the Northern Central Railway ==
The historic Northern Central Railway was a vital transportation artery during the American Civil War. The line ran between Harrisburg, Pennsylvania and Baltimore, Maryland providing a direct north–south route in which federal troops and supplies were shuttled to the southernmost reaches of Union territory. The railroad's strategic importance was understood by the Confederates and as such it was targeted by rebel troops during Robert E. Lee's Invasion of the North in June 1863. Railroad bridges, rolling stock, and telegraph lines along the Northern Central right-of-way were ruthlessly destroyed by the advancing rebel army.

The railway was pressed into military service shortly after the Battle of Gettysburg, transporting wounded troops to distant metropolitan hospitals in York, Baltimore, and Harrisburg. Several months later, President Abraham Lincoln and other dignitaries traveled over the line on their way to commemorate the Soldier's National Cemetery at Gettysburg where Lincoln delivered his now famous address.

The president and company boarded their private train in Baltimore and journeyed north over Northern Central tracks to Hanover Junction where they changed trains to continue West. The depot at Hanover Junction where Mr. Lincoln changed trains still stands today and is on the National Register of Historic Places. Much of the surrounding countryside has remained relatively unchanged since Lincoln's historic journey.

== Current operations ==
The Northern Central Railway of York operates a 3 1/2-hour round trip excursion from New Freedom to Howard Tunnel, as well as a 2 1/2-hour round trip excursion from New Freedom to Hanover Junction, where a brief layover provides an opportunity to explore the museum at Hanover Junction Depot. The railroad also operates a shorter, one-hour round trip excursion from New Freedom to Glen Rock.

The trains feature 4-4-0 steam locomotive York, a faithful reproduction of a typical American Standard engine common on North American railroads in the mid to late 19th century. York was custom built by the Kloke Locomotive Works in 2010–2013. Its design was based on O'Connor Engineering blueprints for the replica Union Pacific No. 119 and Central Pacific "Jupiter" locomotives (both engines currently reside at the Golden Spike National Historic Site in Utah). Kloke also built the Leviathan locomotive, which now operates in Elizabethtown, Pennsylvania.

The Northern Central train typically consists of four passenger coaches, one of which is converted to an open air car through the summer and fall. During each excursion, interpreters in period wardrobe offer historical commentary for passengers. Their narration provides insight into the importance of the railroad and its neighboring communities during the Civil War years and thereafter.

Special events planned for train rides throughout the year, such as musical entertainers and character reenactments, help support and complement the historical atmosphere of the railroad.

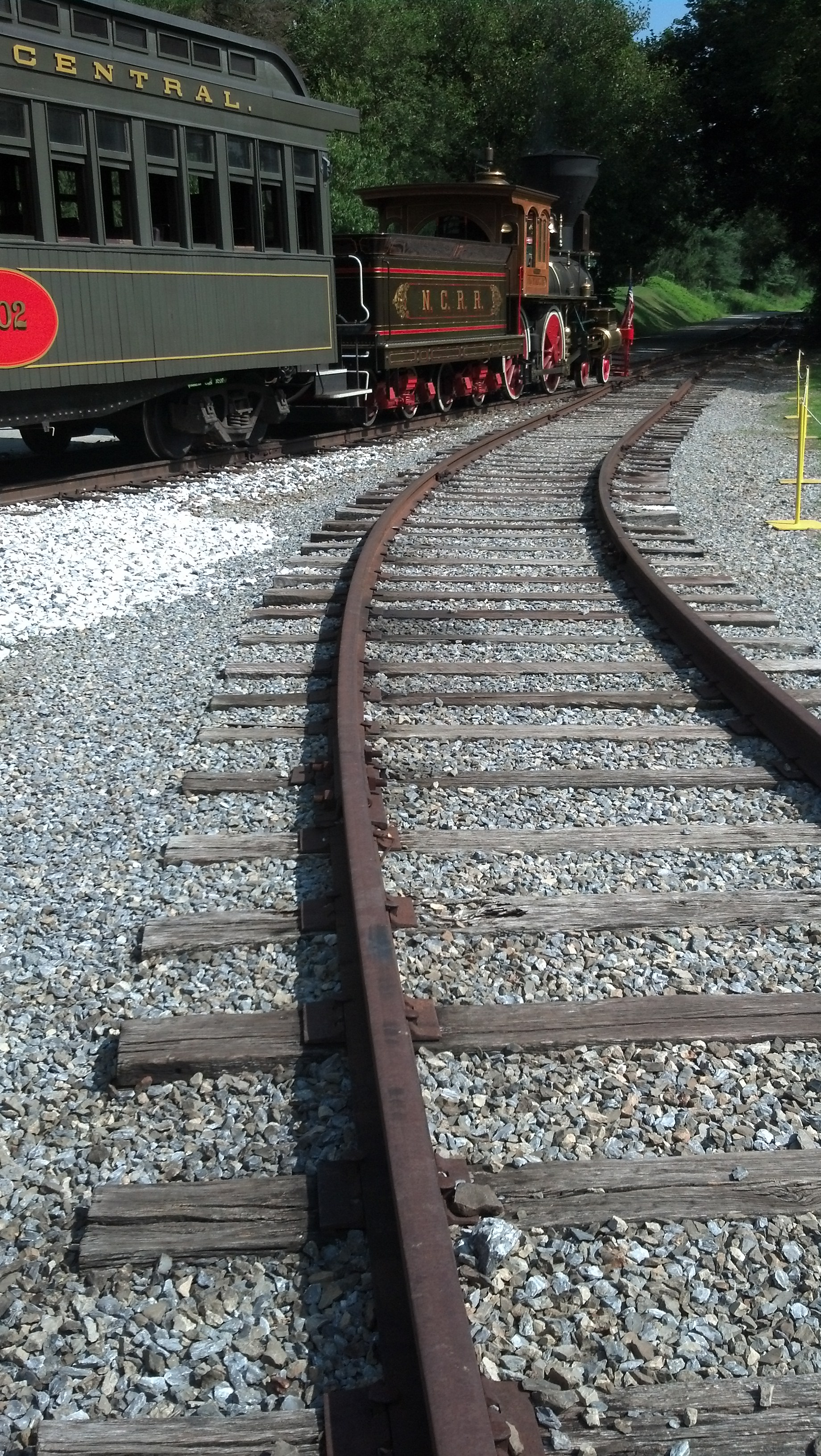
Steam into History's train facing South towards New Freedom.

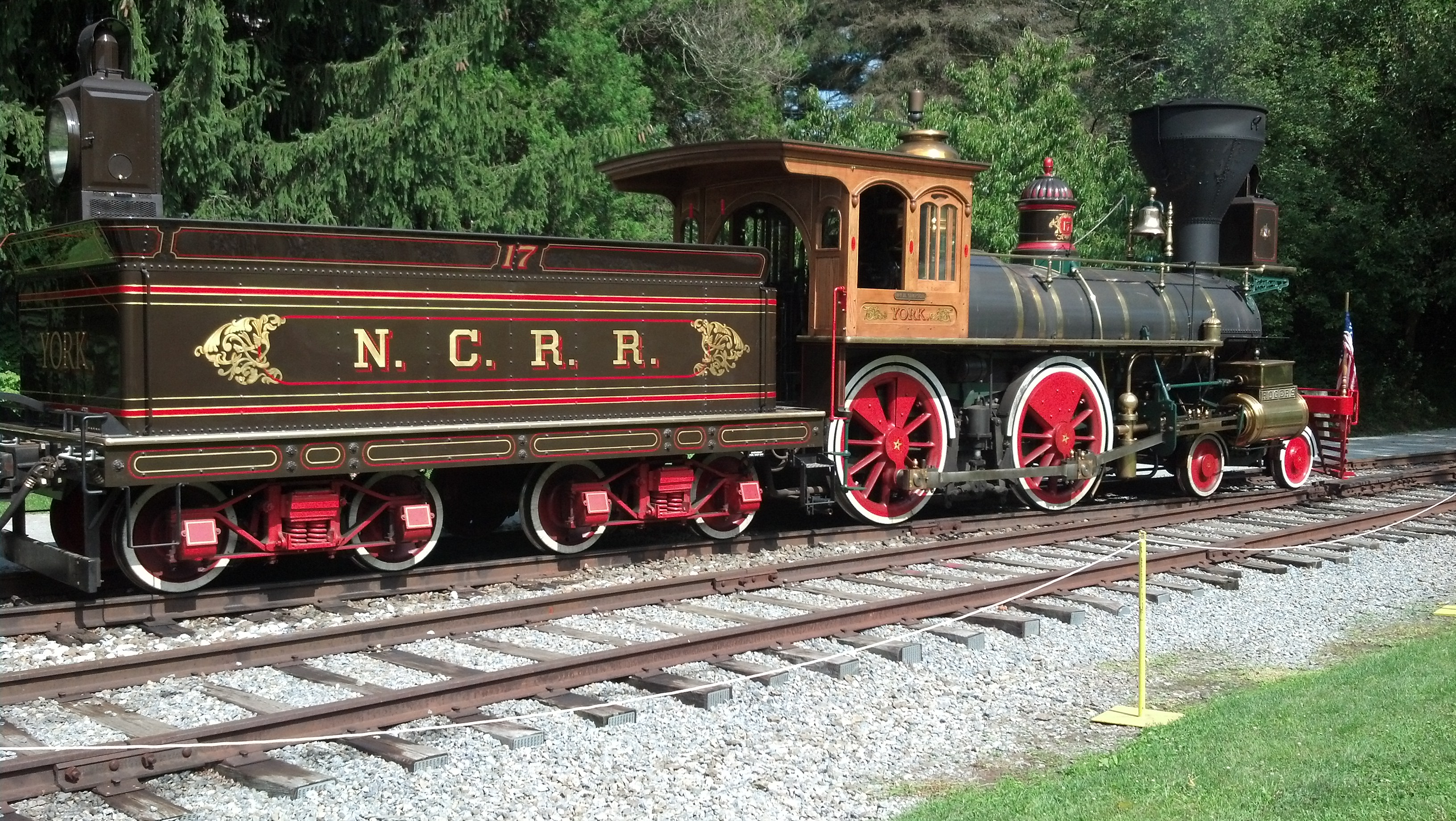
The York about to depart Hanover Junction. The locomotive burns oil as an alternative fuel for wood.

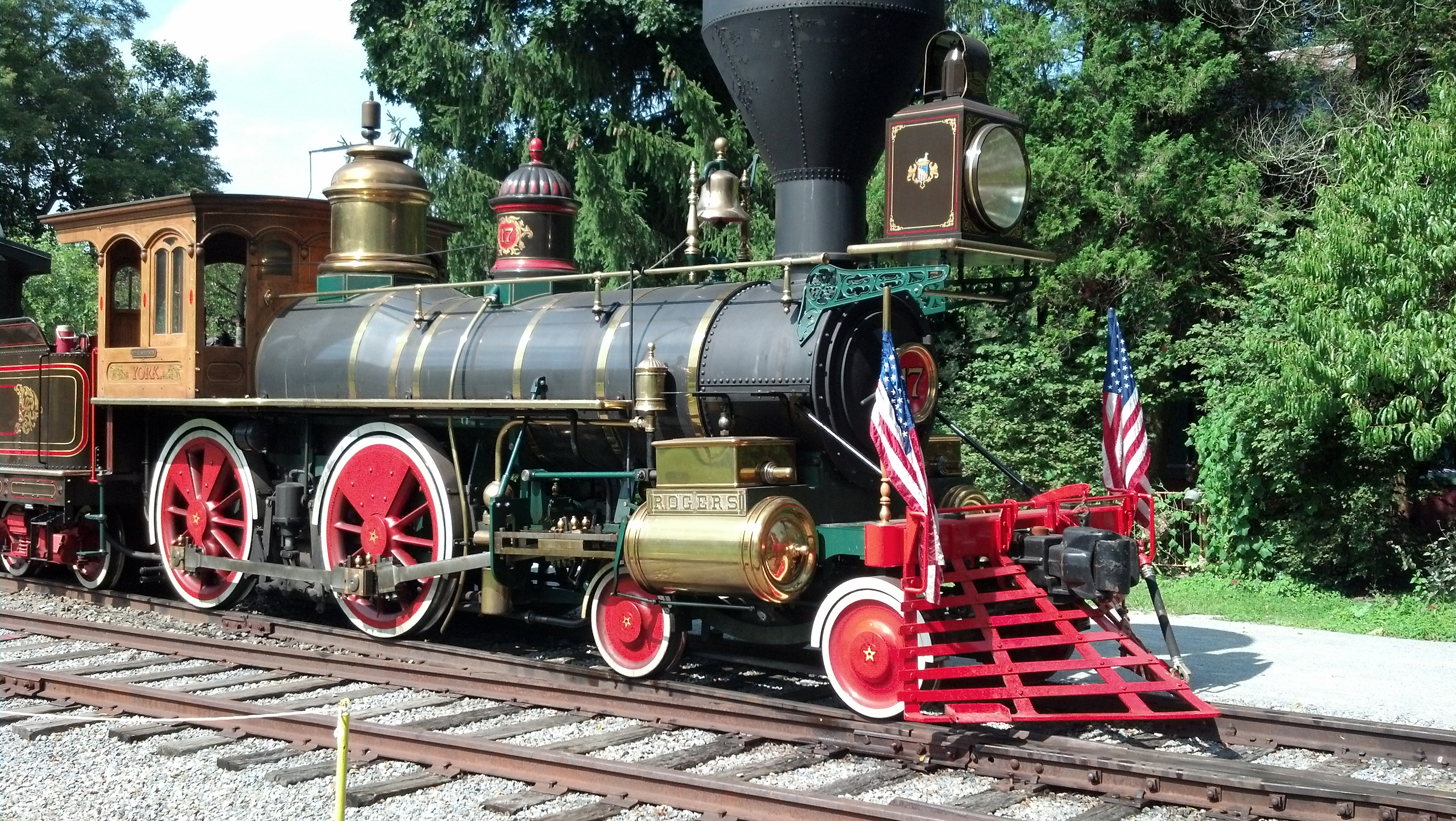
Locomotive detailing of York

== Equipment ==
=== Locomotive roster ===
No.	Class	Engine	Builder	Built	Notes
17	4-4-0	Steam	Kloke Loco Works LLC.	2013	Custom built for SIH based on blueprints for Golden Spike replica engines. Sports a bonnet smoke stack complete with Spark arrestor commonly used on wood burning engines of the period. The York, however, burns oil instead of wood for both economic and practical reasons. Painted in NCRR livery.
32	GE 80 Tonner	Diesel	GE	1952	Built new for the US Army as 1685, later B-1685, later bought in 2016 by the PA & Southern in Chambersburg, PA. Acquired by McHugh Locomotive in 2023, and later sold to Northern Central Railway in September 2024.
6076	GP9	Diesel	EMD	1957	Built for the Pennsylvania Railroad.
N/A		Railroad Speeder			MoW Equipment.
336A	0-4-0VBT	Steam	Societe Anonyme de St. Leonard	1877	Originally used for switching within Societe Anonyme de St. Leonard, was later sold to the Belgian mining firm of Charbonnages du Hasard, operating until 1960. Purchased by F. Nelson Blount, and brought to the U.S. in 1964, the engine was given the name "Prince de Liege", and remained on display at Steamtown, U.S.A. until sold to a private owner in 1988. Acquired by the NCRY in 2017, the engine is currently undergoing restoration to operation.

=== Current rolling stock roster ===
- Coach 150, owned by SIH.
- Combine 840, owned by SIH.
- "Four Seasons Car" 127, owned by SIH. Designed for conversion between coach and open car.
- Gondola car No. 8148, owned by SIH. Used to hold bikes during Bike Aboard trains
- Caboose No. 613. owned by SIH. Hosts elevated cupola seats and wicker chairs.

=== Past rolling stock ===
- No. 7580, 1957 GP9, Previously operated by the Colebrookdale Railroad.
- No. 10, 1946 GE 44 Ton Locomotive, leased from the Stewartstown Railroad.
- Coach 702, loaned from the Tavares, Eustis & Gulf Railroad.
- Coach 213, loaned from the Tavares, Eustis & Gulf Railroad.
- Open Air Car 101, loaned from the Tavares, Eustis & Gulf Railroad.

Both 702 and 213 served as the main passenger consist from June 1 to September 29, 2013, while SIH's coach and combine were constructed by the Reader Railroad.

== See also ==
- List of heritage railroads in the United States
- List of Pennsylvania railroads
- Northern Central Railway
- Hanover Junction, Hanover and Gettysburg Railroad
