= Orange Express =

Orange Express may refer to:

- the Ferrocarril de Sóller, an interurban railway on the Spanish island of Mallorca
- the Orange Blossom Express, a proposed commuter rail system in the US state of Florida
- the 1980-1981 side of the Oregon State University men's basketball team
- a track on the album Eyes of Innocence by the Miami Sound Machine
