= Inland Lakes Railway =

Coordinates: 28.8537°N 81.6846°W

Overview
- Headquarters: Eustis, Florida
- Locale: Florida
- Dates of operation: 2005–2009

Technical
- Track gauge: 4 ft 8 1/2 in (1,435 mm) standard gauge

The Inland Lakes Railway, later known as Florida Rail Adventures, was a tourist railroad located in the northwestern portion of Central Florida. The railway operated several excursion trains ranging from a five course dinner train to sightseeing excursions throughout Lake and Orange Counties. The company operated through a lease agreement with the Florida Central Railroad, the owner of the tracks. Trains operated between the towns of Mount Dora, Tavares, Eustis, Lake Jem, and Orlando.

Florida Rail Adventures no longer operates and has been divesting itself of equipment.

== Trains ==
=== Orange Blossom Dinner Train ===
The Orange Blossom Dinner Train was a three-hour, 24-mile round trip ride. Trains departed from the Eustis depot and traveled to Lake Jem. A four course meal was prepared on board the train and featured a different menu every few months. Another added feature for the trip; for an additional cost, a passenger could eat dinner served in the railway's dome car. Trains were diesel powered and had enclosed, air-conditioned cars.

=== Magnolia Sun Lunch Train ===
The Magnolia Sun Lunch Train was a nine-mile, two-hour train ride that took passengers from Eustis to the Dora Canal and return. Trains were diesel powered and had enclosed, air-conditioned cars.

=== Mount Dora Meteor ===
The Mount Dora Meteor was day time excursion train that departed from the railway's Mount Dora depot. Narrated by the conductor, passengers embarked on a 1.5 hour, ten mile round trip excursion between the towns of Mount Dora and Tavares. Sights included: Lake Dora, Lake Gertrude, The Golden Triangle, and several orange groves. A unique feature of the trip was being turned around at the Tavares wye. Passengers could watch as the conductor and engineer maneuvered the train around the wye in preparation for the return trip to Mount Dora. Trains were diesel powered and had open window coaches.

=== Murder Mystery Express ===
New for the 2008 operating year was the Murder Mystery Express. It was a three-hour, 24-mile round trip ride departing from Eustis to Lake Jem and return. The Giggles and Bits Players presentation of Fat Louie's Pizza to Die For was the main play for the trip. The bungling, misguided misfits entertained passengers as they dined. At the end of the play, guests were asked to help solve the premeditated murder. It was originally envisioned that this train would be expanded to operate on several other nights, all with differently themed plays. The guests would guess the murderer and the main prize was a cruise. Trains were diesel powered and had enclosed air-conditioned cars.

=== Italian Star Dinner Train ===
The Italian Star Dinner Train was similar to railway's Magnolia Sun Lunch Train, however it featured an Italian themed menu.

=== Orlando Magic Express ===
The Orlando Magic Express took passengers to Orlando for select Orlando Magic basketball games. One of the railway's larger excursions, trains traveled from Eustis to Downtown Orlando. Generally trains took roughly two hours to reach downtown and dinner was served in the dining car. Once the train arrived in Orlando, the conductor escorted passengers two blocks to the Amway Arena for the game.

=== Rail Rambles ===
Taken from the popular excursion trains by the Atlantic Coast Line in the 1950s and 1960s, The Florida Rail Adventures had created its own Rail Ramble excursion trains. Trains departed Eustis for an all day excursion on the entire railroad, including a trip all the way into downtown Orlando. The Railway's dining car was taken along for the excursion and offered lunch throughout the trip. Generally, photo run-bys were conducted on the return portion of the trip. Trains were diesel powered and had both open window and enclosed, air-conditioned cars.

=== Special Excursions ===
Throughout the year the railway offered many special excursions. Santa's Winter Wonderland Express, Gunfight at the O.K. Corral, Pumpkin Patch Express, & Day Out with Thomas were some of the special excursions operated.

== Equipment ==
Florida Rail Adventures has sold or auctioned many of its rail assets. Its main motive power consisted of EMD GP10 No. 8330 and EMD NW2 No. 15. No. 8330 was built as a GP9B for the Union Pacific before being converted by Illinois Central, and No. 15 was built for the Nickel Plate Road.

== Tracks ==
The tracks that the Florida Rail Adventures trains traveled on were once part of three independent railroads that were built mostly in the 1880s. Portions of some of these lines have been abandoned and removed over the years due to the loss of their customer base or due to redundancy occurring after mergers that eventually combined all three of the original lines into one system. These lines once served a large citrus and agricultural industry but due to several devastating freezes in the 1980s and 1990s, these industries gradually moved further south. The following is a brief history of these three independent railroads and how they eventually became one.

=== Eustis to Tavares ===
The line from Eustis to Tavares was originally built as the St. Johns & Lake Eustis Railway Company (StJ&LE). This company was chartered in 1879 and construction started at Astor on the St. Johns River. The line was built 3 ft (914 mm) narrow gauge and its rails passed through Altoona, Umatilla and Ft. Mason before reaching Eustis, 27 miles, in 1880. Construction continued southward through Tavares, reaching Lane Park on Big Lake Harris, 7.5 miles, in 1882-83. The line was then extended 15 miles from Ft. Mason, around the north and west sides of Lake Eustis to Leesburg in 1884. The line originally served as a land bridge for the river and lake steamboats that provided transportation into the interior of Florida. Passengers and freight could come down the St. Johns River on steamboats from Jacksonville and transfer to the railroad at Astor for ports on Lakes Eustis, Dora and Harris. They could then transfer back to a lake steamer to continue to points further south.

The StJ&LE was leased to the Florida Southern Railway Company, a 3 ft (914 mm) narrow gauge system, from 1885 to 1889 and subleased to the Jacksonville, Tampa & Key West Railway Co. from 1889 to 1890. The lease was cancelled in 1890 and the StJ&LE resumed operations until 1893. They went into bankruptcy in 1893 and were operated by a receiver until they were sold to the Plant System in 1896. Railroad tycoon Henry Plant reorganized it as the St. Johns & Lake Eustis Railroad Co. and immediately converted the tracks to standard gauge. It was operated as a part of his Plant System as the Savannah, Florida & Western Railroad Company until his death. His family, having no interest in his railroad empire, sold it to the Atlantic Coast Line Railroad Company (ACL) in 1902. The ACL operated the line until 1967 when they merged with the Seaboard Air Line to form the Seaboard Coast Line (SCL).

Abandonments began in 1941 with the portion of the line from Astor to Altoona, 17.7 miles. The line from Tavares to Lane Park, 1.5 miles, followed in 1942. Then in 1956 the portion from Altoona to Umatilla, 3 miles, was abandoned. These abandonments were due to a loss of a customer base. Lastly, the line from Ft. Mason to Leesburg, 15 miles, was abandoned in 1967 due to being redundant after the merger to form the SCL.

=== Tavares to Mount Dora ===
The line from Tavares to Mt. Dora was chartered as the Sanford & Lake Eustis Railway Co. in 1885. Construction began in Sanford in 1885 and its rails passed through Sylvan Lake, Sorrento and Mt. Dora before reaching Tavares, 25.8 miles in 1887. The line was constructed to 4 ft 9 in (1,448 mm) gauge and was immediately leased to the Jacksonville, Tampa & Key West Railway Company (JT&KW). The JT&KW merged it into their Jacksonville to Sanford system in 1890 and operated it as their Sanford & Lake Eustis Division. The JT&KW went into bankruptcy in 1893 and was operated by a receiver until 1899. The receiver leased the system to the Plant Investment Company (PICO) in 1899 and it was then operated as the Lake Eustis Division of the Savannah, Florida & Western Railroad Company (SF&W). It was sold to PICO in 1900 and fully merged into Plant's SF&W where it remained until his death. As stated earlier, his family had no interest in his railroad empire and sold it to the Atlantic Coast Line Railroad Company (ACL) in 1902. The ACL operated the line until 1967 when they merged with the Seaboard Air Line to form the Seaboard Coast Line (SCL).

After the merger that formed the SCL, the line was redundant and was abandoned from Sylvan Lake, 6 miles west of Sanford, to Sorrento, 13 miles, in 1980. Then in 1983 the 6 miles from Sanford to Sylvan Lake was abandoned.

=== Tavares to Orlando ===
The line from Tavares to Orlando was charted as the Tavares, Orlando & Atlantic Railroad Company (TO&A) in 1881. Construction began in Tavares in 1882 and the 5 ft (1,524 mm) broad gauge line reached Orlando, 32 miles, via Lake Jem, Zellwood, Plymouth and Apopka in 1884. The TO&A negotiated an agreement with the St. Johns & Lake Eustis (StJ&LE) to share the right-of-way around the west side of Lake Dora for a distance of about one mile. This saved building another trestle and bridge over the Dora Canal. It also created an unusual four rail dual gauge arrangement with the TO&A 5 ft (1,524 mm) gauge rails on the outside and the StJ&LE 3 ft (914 mm) gauge rail in between. The TO&A also had financial difficulties after failing to pay interest on bonds and was sold at a public auction to The Florida Central & Peninsular Railroad Company (TFC&P) in 1891.

TFC&P was a fairly large system, reaching from Fernandina Beach to Jacksonville, Tallahassee, Ocala, Wildwood, Leesburg and Tavares. TFC&P had financial difficulties as well and reorganized as Florida Central & Peninsular Railroad Company (FC&P) ("The" omitted from name) in 1893. The Seaboard Air Line Railway bought controlling interest in the FC&P in 1900 and fully merged it into their system in 1903. The SAL had financial difficulties and was reorganized as the Seaboard Air Line Railway Company in 1915 ("Company" added to name). The SAL again reorganized as the Seaboard Air Line Railroad Company (SAL) in 1945. In 1967 the SAL merged with the Atlantic Coast Line to form the Seaboard Coast Line Railroad (SCL).

With the exception of a few farm spurs, no abandonments have occurred on the original TO&A line and the entire original 32 miles are intact and fully operational today.

=== Recent History ===
The three original railroads went through a series of bankruptcies, sales, and mergers, which brought them under one banner in 1967 as part of the Seaboard Coast Line. In 1983 the SCL was merged into the Seaboard System. This corporation was a stepping stone used to merge the Chessie System with the SCL's Family Lines in 1986 to form the present day CSX Corporation.

CSX, being an extremely large rail system, could not operate branch lines efficiently and provide the personalized service that customers required. Therefore, many of their branch lines were sold off as short line railroads in the '80s and '90s. In 1986 the Pinsly Railroad Company, owner of several short line railroads in other states, was selected by CSX to operate the branch as the Florida Central Railroad with their local base of operations located in the former SAL depot in Plymouth.

The Florida Rail Adventures operated on Florida Central Railroad's tracks by agreement. Scheduled passenger service on the line from Wildwood to Orlando was terminated in 1954 by the SAL. The tracks from Leesburg to Tavares were abandoned in 1982 and from Wildwood to Leesburg between 2001 and 2008 due to loss of their customer base.

After more than 125 years, this historic branch line continues to serve its many customers who depend on it for reliable, economical, efficient transportation to move their raw materials to their plants and to move their finished products to market.

== See also ==
- Tavares, Eustis & Gulf Railroad
