= List of scenic railroads =

A scenic railroad or scenic railway is a train service operating leisure tours of sights such as mountain scenery and foliage tours.

== Scenic railroads ==
=== United States ===
Scenic railroads in the United States include:

- Adirondack Scenic Railroad
- Boone and Scenic Valley Railroad
- Branson Scenic Railway
- Cass Scenic Railroad at Cass Scenic Railroad State Park
- Catskill Mountain Railroad
- Cuyahoga Valley Scenic Railroad
- Cumbres and Toltec Scenic Railroad
- Conway Scenic Railroad
- Durango and Silverton Narrow Gauge Railroad
- Kettle Moraine Scenic Railroad (defunct)
- Mount Hood Railroad
- Mount Rainier Scenic Railroad
- Oregon Coast Scenic Railroad
- Potomac Eagle Scenic Railroad
- Rio Grande Scenic Railroad
- Stone Mountain Scenic Railroad
- Western Maryland Scenic Railroad
- Winnipesaukee Scenic Railroad

=== Great Britain ===
According to the Merriam Webster Dictionary, scenic railways in Britain are miniature railroads traveling by artificial scenery, for example, at amusement parks.

== See also ==
- Heritage railway
- List of heritage railroads in the United States
- List of railway museums
