= San Luis Obispo Railroad Museum =

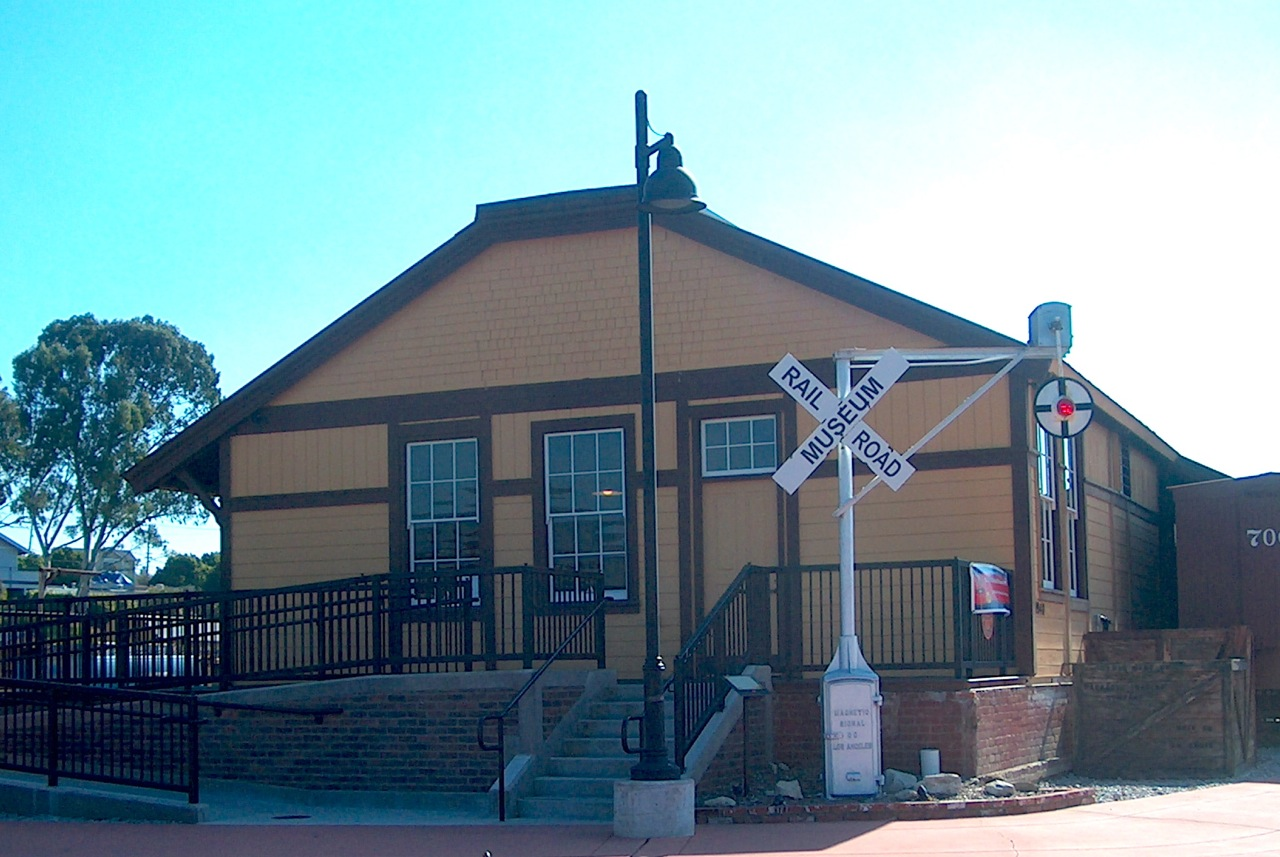
- The 1894 former Southern Pacific freight house, occupied by the San Luis Obispo Railroad Museum
- Established: 2013
- Location: 1940 Santa Barbara Ave; San Luis Obispo, California
- Coordinates: 35.273175°N 120.655331°W
- Type: Railroad museum
- Website: http://slorrm.com/

The San Luis Obispo Railroad Museum, in San Luis Obispo, California, was founded to preserve and present the railroad history of California, and specifically the Central Coast, by collecting, restoring, displaying, and operating historic railroad equipment. The museum also maintains a research library, and document and photographic archives, and is developing an oral history program. The museum is open every Saturday from 10 am to 4 pm, and other times for groups by arrangement. The museum hosts special events in May and October each year. The museum's website, periodic emails, and the quarterly Coast Mail newsletter provide information on activities and resources.

== The Facility ==
Opened in 2013, the museum occupies the restored former Southern Pacific Freighthouse (built 1894) at 1940 Santa Barbara Avenue, adjacent to the Union Pacific main line and about one-quarter mile south of the San Luis Obispo Amtrak station. A standard-gauge display track extends along the east side of the building, and a short narrow-gauge display track is on the west side. The Freighthouse contains an exhibit hall and a model railroad depicting the three-foot-gauge Pacific Coast Railway at Port San Luis circa 1920, and the standard-gauge Southern Pacific Coast Line from Surf to Paso Robles, including the Cuesta Grade crossing of the Santa Lucia range circa 1950 (under construction in 2018 but largely operational). There is a children's play area incorporating hands-on train tables and a Museum Store offering railroad books, lanterns, and clothing, and other items. The building, its restrooms, and the model railroad area are fully accessible. The platform along the display track provides a safe place to view and photograph passing and waiting trains.

== The collection ==
On display are express wagons, station furnishings, switch stands, signal components, telegraph equipment, historical and contemporary photographs, a handcar, a velocipede, push cars, a maintenance-of-way pickup truck, mine and orchard railway equipment, and locomotive headlights, bells, and whistles. Library books, documents, and photographs are being cataloged and are available to researchers by arrangement.

=== Rolling stock ===
- La Cuesta, a 1926 Pullman observation-lounge car originally built for the Santa Fe Railway, is undergoing restoration and can be boarded from the freighthouse platform.
- Southern Pacific bay window caboose No. 1886 is on the display track and almost completely restored inside and out.
- A former Southern Pacific tank car manufactured in 1903 (pressed and riveted steel) is on the display track and undergoing restoration.
- A former Southern Pacific steel gondola with wood side extensions, used in sugar beet service, is on the display track and is undergoing restoration.
- A former Southern Pacific F-70-7 flatcar built in 1949 is on the display track and is undergoing restoration.
- Former United States Army Corps of Engineers (Quartermaster Corps) No. 2038, a 20-ton Plymouth switching locomotive, acquired in 1941 and used to development and supply Camp Roberts near San Miguel, California, during World War II; it is on the display track, in good condition, but not its original appearance.
- Pacific Coast Railway boxcar No. 706 has been cosmetically restored on the exterior and the interior has been converted to storage and restrooms, accessible from the Freighthouse interior.
- Pacific Coast Railway boxcar of the 1200 series is undergoing cosmetic restoration and is displayed on the west side of the building.
- Southern Pacific Class C-30-1 wood-sided, cupola caboose is awaiting restoration and is viewable on the south end of the display track.
- Southern Pacific Class B-50-13, outside-braced boxcar, is through a majority of its restoration. Once completed, the interior will house additional artifacts. It is viewable on the display track near the museum's front door.
- Two Southern Pacific subsidiary Pacific Motor Transport semitrailers are awaiting restoration and are located at the south end of the freighthouse. They are to be installed on the museum's flatcar as part of what may be the only Southern Pacific Trailer-On-Flatcar (TOFC) exhibit once completed.

== See also ==
- List of heritage railroads in the United States
- List of museums in California
