= Reader Railroad =

Tourist steam railroad in Arkansas, U.S.

Overview
- Headquarters: Hot Springs, Arkansas
- Reporting mark: RERX
- Locale: Hot Springs, Arkansas, U.S.
- Dates of operation: 1973–1991

Technical
- Track gauge: 4 ft 8 1/2 in (1,435 mm) standard gauge
- Length: 23.4 mi (37.7 km)

The 5-mile (8.0 km) Reader Railroad was a tourist-only railroad operating in Reader, Arkansas from 1973 to 1991. As a 23-mile (37 km) common carrier prior to May 1973, it was the last all steam locomotive-powered, mixed train railroad operating in North America. It operated trackage in Ouachita County and Nevada County, Arkansas. The five mile tourist railroad operated until 1991, when it could not meet new federal safety regulations.

The original Reader Railroad, which ran through Nevada and Ouachita counties, was one of the last remaining railroads operated completely by steam locomotives. The railroad operated 23 miles from a connection with the Missouri Pacific at Reader to an asphalt plant located at Waterloo. Though no longer in operation, either as a common carrier or as a tourist attraction, it has drawn many to the area and was a featured set piece in film and television as well as a number of national magazines. The locomotive and renovated station were used in the television miniseries North and South. The locomotive was featured in the remake of 3:10 to Yuma as well as the movies There Will Be Blood and Appaloosa.

== Early history ==
The Sayre Narrow Gauge, the railroad's original name, was constructed in 1889 to move the virgin timber that was being harvested south of Reader, which is on the Nevada-Ouachita County border, for a sawmill at the St. Louis, Iron Mountain and Southern Railway located in Gurdon (Clark County). In 1910, the line was purchased by the McVay Lumber Company and, in 1913, was taken over by the Valley Lumber Company, which extended it to tracts of timber in lower Nevada County. A. S. Johnson purchased the sawmill company in 1921 and, in 1925, organized the Reader Railroad, named after the small community and postal stop of Reader, which was held under the parent company of Mansfield Hardwood Lumber Company, as a common carrier to transport freight to and from newly discovered oil fields near Waterloo (Nevada County).

Reader Railroad continued to work the river bottoms and creek valleys, hauling timber and freight until the mid-1950s, when the parent company was dissolved. Shreveport businessman Tom M. Long purchased the railroad and renovated the line. He promoted the railroad for passenger and freight traffic until the energy crisis of the early 1970s closed the Berry refinery in Waterloo, and the remaining freight and tourist traffic could not sustain the little railroad. Long petitioned to abandon the line in September 1972 and the final day of operation was May 19, 1973. Five miles of track in the Reader area was sold to a group of businessmen in the area who worked to preserve it. They, in turn, sold it again in 1980 to the present owner, R. A. Grigsby, who focused on emphasizing the history of Reader Railroad and the role it played in the development of south Arkansas.

The private tourist railroad owned many refurbished cars, including two oil-burning locomotives built in 1907 and 1913, respectively, and one wood-burning locomotive built in 1907, as well as passenger cars, excursion cars, flatcars, boxcars, a tank car, and two stove-heated cabooses. The railroad was operated as it might have been seventy to eighty years earlier. At the end of the track, the engine was turned by hand on an Armstrong turntable. The engine then picked up the train, while the caboose was placed on the rear for the return trip, a total of five miles, taking approximately two hours.

Little if any of the original rolling stock owned by the common carrier Reader remains on the property and the turntable was added after Long sold the property. The original railroad operated locomotives bought from the St. Louis Southwestern Railway (Cotton Belt), Caddo River Railroad, Warren and Saline River Railroad and the Angelina and Neches River Railroad. The railroad also owned one caboose, several former Chicago, Rock Island and Pacific Railroad coaches, a Milwaukee Road combine, and a Kansas City Southern Railroad parlor car. The also operated two wrecking cranes, a hand-operated and a steam-operated crane. The railroad operated a single stall tin covered enginehouse where all locomotive and car repairs were made. Current buildings on the property are reproductions and have no connection to the original railroad. The station used for ticket sales and as the local office for the common carrier Reader came from the adjacent Missouri Pacific branch which the Reader connected with.

== History since 1991 shutdown ==
In 2011 a proposal to partner with Bonham, Texas to establish a tourist railroad did not come to fruition.

Locomotive No. 2, a 2-6-0 Mogul built by Baldwin Locomotive Works in 1907, operated for six years pulling tourist excursions as the Orange Blossom Cannonball on the Tavares, Eustis & Gulf Railroad between Mount Dora and Tavares in Florida, until January 29, 2017.

As of late 2018, owner Richard Grigsby still had steam engines 1 (a 1906 2-6-0 Mogul from Baldwin), 2, and 4 (a 1913 2-6-2 Prairie-type Baldwin) in various states of disrepair, a 1941 45-ton GE diesel switcher in operable condition, and a number of cars with some trackage, all in Reader, Arkansas.

== Media appearances ==
The original Reader Railroad was used in the movie Boxcar Bertha in 1972. The movie stars Barbara Hershey and David Carradine. In 1985, ABC Television and Warner Brothers came to south Arkansas and used the railroad cars and station, enhanced by ABC, for the filming of train shots for the miniseries, North & South. Equipment from the Reader Railroad was also used in filming the 2007 movies 3:10 to Yuma and There Will Be Blood.

== Roster ==
Italicized indicates no longer owned by Reader

Number	Heritage & wheel configuration	Notes
2	Lufkin Land & Lumber Co. 2-6-0	Stored serviceable in Reader, operated on the Tavares, Eustis & Gulf Railroad in Florida between 2011 and 2017
4	Laurel River Lumber Co. 2-6-2	Stored out of service in Reader
7	Victoria Fisher & Western 2-6-2	Stored out of service in Reader
11	Caddo & Choctaw 2-6-2	Sold in 1974, operated in excursion service on the Transkentucky Transportation inc. between 1989-1993 until the purchase from CSX. Still on static display in Riney-B Park near Nicholasville, KY.
108	San Augustine County Lumber Company 2-6-2	Purchased in 1956, sold to the Conway Scenic Railroad and operated between 1977 until 1986. Purchased by the Rannoch Corporation in November 1999. Currently stored in Sulphur Springs, Texas.
1702	US Army Transportation Corp. 2-8-0	USATC S160 Class, later operates on the short-lived Fremont and Elkhorn Valley Railroad in Nebraska, and now it operates at the Great Smoky Mountains Railroad in Bryson City, North Carolina.
