= Poway–Midland Railroad =

Heritage railroad in Poway, California

Coordinates: 32°58′13″N 117°2′13″W

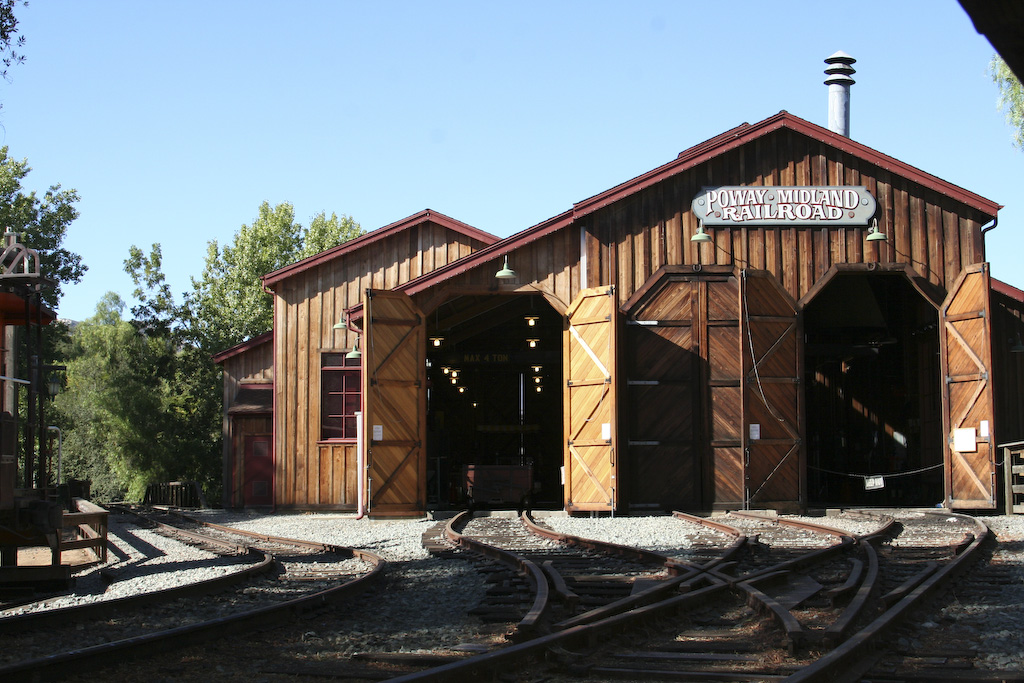
Train shed, September 21, 2007

The Poway–Midland Railroad is a heritage railroad in Old Poway Park in Poway, California.

The group "Poway–Midland Railroad Volunteers, Inc." operates the railroad and was founded in 1991 as a non-profit organization dedicated to the restoration, operation and maintenance of antique railroad equipment.

Excursions are run each weekend (the 1st and 3rd weekends of each month using a 1907 Baldwin 0-4-0 steam locomotive, except in January or February). The line has 11 total pieces of railroad equipment. This operation is unusual in that it has a track gauge of 3 ft 6 in (1,067 mm) narrow gauge.

The Poway–Midland Railroad is owned by the City of Poway and operated and maintained by the Poway–Midland Railroad Volunteers, Inc.

== Preserved equipment ==
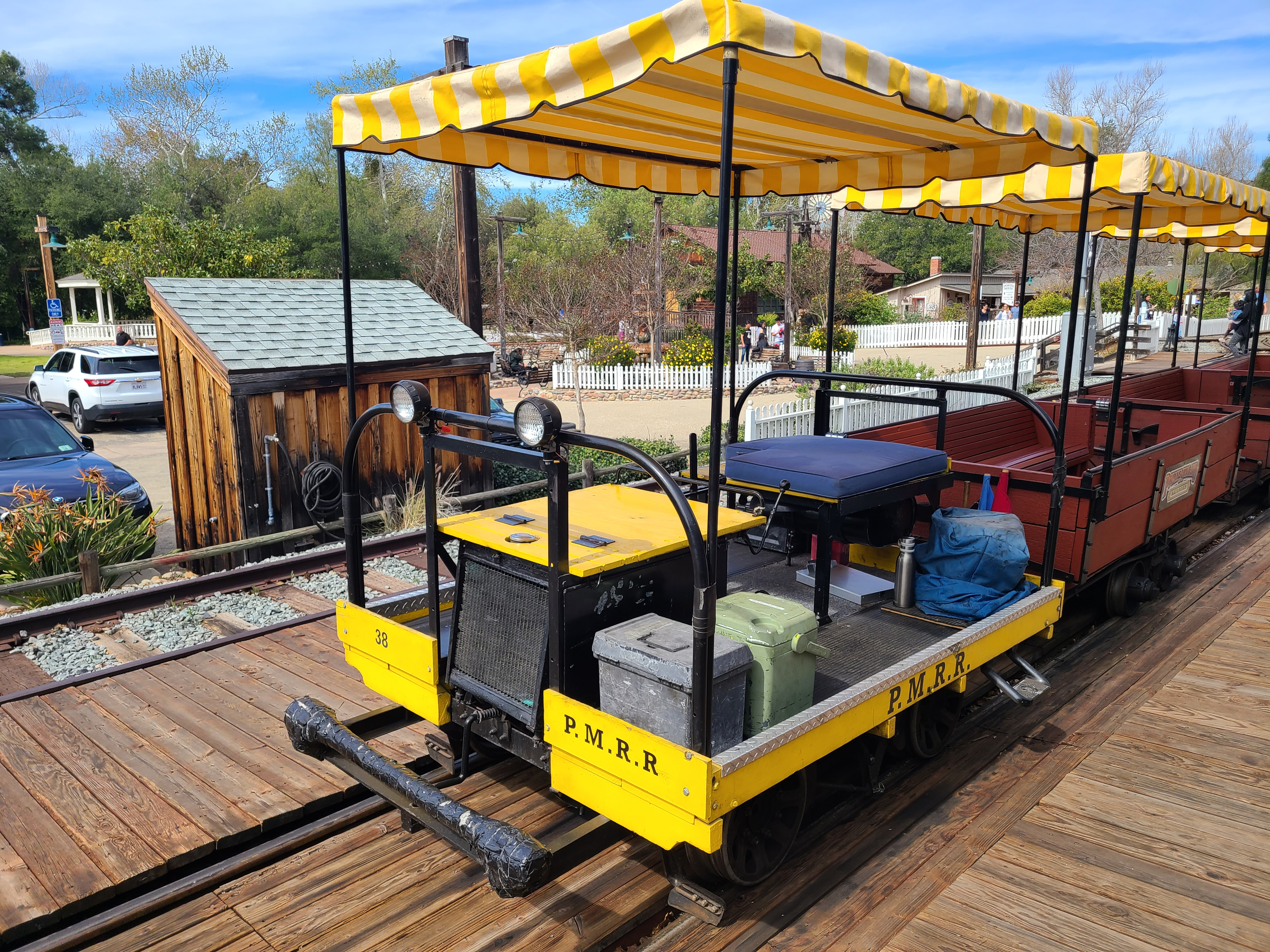
Speeder from Fairmont Railway Motors

- 1907 Baldwin Steam Locomotive
- 1956 Fairmont Speeder
- 1906 San Francisco Cable Car

== Historic timeline ==
- May 1991 – Initial meeting
- Nov 1991 – Incorporation of the PMRR Volunteers
- Sep 1991 – Boxcar arrives on site
- Apr 1993 – Trolley arrives on site
- Jun 1993 – Track work completed
- Jul 4 1993 – Old Poway Park dedication
- Jul 4 1993 – First passenger carried behind speeder
- Sep 1994 – First locomotive passenger run
- Jul 1996 – Record passenger haul (2,500)
- Jan 1997 – First woman fireman qualified
- Oct 1997 – San Francisco Cable Car arrives
- Jul 4 2002 – Turntable dedicated
- Oct 2004 – Barn expansion dedicated
- Oct 2009 – Depot dedicated (new ticket office, train shop, and museum)

== Statistics ==
- Total passengers: 425,336 (As of 1 November 2006)
- Total volunteer hours: 74,492 (As of August 2006)
- 1,866 passengers July 4, 2005
- 1,829 passengers Train Song Fest 2006
- 1,732 passengers Christmas in the Park 2004
- 1,422 Rendezvous 2005
- Operation Lifesaver program presented to 20,000+ viewers
- 40–50 Operations Lifesaver presentations annually
- 397 active members

== See also ==
- List of heritage railroads in the United States
