= List of places in Florida: L =

This list of current cities, towns, unincorporated communities, counties, and other recognized places in the U.S. state of Florida also includes information on the number and names of counties in which the place lies, and its lower and upper ZIP Code bounds, if applicable.

Name of place	Number of counties	Counties	Lower zip code	Upper zip code
LaBelle	1	Hendry	33935	
LaBuena	1	Baker		
Lackawanna	1	Duval	32210	
Lacoochee	1	Pasco	33537	
Lacota	1	Marion		
LaCrosse	1	Alachua	32658	
Lacymark	1	Columbia		
Ladonia	1	Citrus		
Lady Lake	1	Lake	32159	
Lafayette	1	Leon	32308	
La Gorce Island	1	Miami-Dade	33139	
La Grange	1	Brevard	32780	
Lagrange	1	Brevard		
Laguna Beach	1	Bay	32413	
Laird	1	Bay		
Lake Alfred	1	Polk	33850	
Lake Asbury	1	Clay		
Lake Ashby Shores	1	Volusia		
Lake Belvedere Estates	1	Palm Beach		
Lake Bird	1	Taylor	32331	
Lake Bradford	1	Leon	32301	
Lake Brantley	1	Seminole	32750	
Lake Bryant	1	Marion		
Lake Buena Vista	1	Orange	32830	
Lake Butler	1	Union	32054	
Lake Butler	1	Orange		
Lake Cain Hills	1	Orange	32805	
Lake Carroll	1	Hillsborough	33618	
Lake Charm	1	Seminole	32765	
Lake City	1	Columbia	32055	
Lake Clarke Shores	1	Palm Beach	33406	
Lake Como	1	Putnam	32157	
Lake Fern	1	Hillsborough		
Lake Forest	1	Broward	33023	
Lake Forest	1	Duval	32208	
Lake Forest Hills	1	Duval		
Lake Forest Manor	1	Duval		
Lake Frances	1	Lake	32778	
Lake Garfield	1	Polk	33830	
Lake Geneva	1	Clay	32160	
Lake Hamilton	1	Polk	33851	
Lake Harbor	1	Palm Beach	33459	
Lake Hart	1	Orange		
Lake Helen	1	Volusia	32744	
Lake Holloway	1	Polk		
Lake Jackson	1	Leon		
Lake Jem	1	Lake	32745	
Lake Joanna	1	Lake	32726	
Lake Jovita	1	Pasco		
Lake Juniata	1	Lake	32778	
Lake Kathryn	1	Lake		
Lake Kathryn Estates	1	Seminole	32707	
Lake Kathryn Heights	1	Lake	32720	
Lake Kathryn Village	1	Seminole	32707	
Lakeland	1	Polk	33801	13
Lakeland Highlands	1	Polk		
Lake Lindsey	1	Hernando	34601	
Lake Lorraine	1	Okaloosa		
Lake Lucerne	1	Miami-Dade	33054	
Lake Lucina	1	Duval	32211	
Lake Mack-Forest Hills	1	Lake		
Lake Mack Park	1	Lake		
Lake Magdalene	1	Hillsborough	33612	
Lake Maitland	1	Orange		
Lake Manatee	1	Manatee		
Lake Marian Highlands	1	Osceola	32739	
Lake Mary	1	Seminole	32746	
Lake Mary Jane	1	Orange		
Lake Maude	1	Polk	33880	
Lake Mendelin Estates	1	Orange	32703	
Lake Monroe	1	Seminole	32747	
Lakemont	1	Highlands		
Lake Mystic	1	Liberty		
Lake of the Hills	1	Polk	33853	
Lake Ola	1	Lake	32757	
Lake Panasoffkee	1	Sumter	33538	
Lake Park	1	Palm Beach	33403	
Lake Park Estates	1	Duval		
Lake Pasadena Heights	1	Pasco		
Lake Placid	1	Highlands	33852	
Lakeport	1	Glades	33471	
Lake Rogers Isle	1	Palm Beach	33432	
Lake Sarasota	1	Sarasota		
Lake Saunders Trailer Park	1	Lake	32757	
Lakes by the Bay	1	Miami-Dade		
Lake Shipp Heights	1	Polk	33880	
Lakeshore	1	Polk		
Lake Shore	1	Duval	32244	
Lake Shore Estates	1	Pinellas	33563	
Lakeside	1	Clay		
Lakeside	1	Leon		
Lakeside Green	1	Palm Beach		
Lake Stafford	1	Citrus		
Lake Suzy	1	DeSoto	34266	
Lake Tallavana	1	Gadsden		
Lake Tarpon	1	Pinellas	34684	
Lake Tarpon Mobile Homes	1	Pinellas	33563	
Lakeview	1	Broward	33441	
Lake View Point	1	Gadsden		
Lake Wales	1	Polk	33853	
Lake Weir	1	Marion	32679	
Lakewood	1	Duval	32217	
Lakewood	1	Leon	32301	
Lakewood	1	Walton	32566	
Lakewood Gardens	1	Palm Beach		
Lakewood Park	1	St. Lucie		
Lakewood Ranch	1	Manatee		
Lake Worth	1	Palm Beach	33460	67
Lake Worth Corridor	1	Palm Beach		
Lake Yvette	1	Gadsden		
Lamont	1	Jefferson	32336	
Lanair Park	1	Palm Beach	33460	
Lanark Village	1	Franklin	32323	
Lancaster	1	Suwannee	32060	
Land o' Lakes	1	Pasco	34639	
Landrum	1	Citrus		
Lands End Ranch	1	Putnam		
Lane	1	Duval		
Lane Park	1	Lake	32778	
Langfords	1	Calhoun		
Langmar	1	Duval		
Lanier	1	Lake		
Lansing	1	Citrus		
Lansing	1	DeSoto		
Lantana	1	Palm Beach	33462	
Largo	1	Pinellas	34640	49
Larsen	1	Duval	32216	
Latin Quarter	1	Miami-Dade		
Lauderdale-by-the-Sea	1	Broward	33308	
Lauderdale Isles	1	Broward	33312	
Lauderdale Lakes	1	Broward	33313	
Lauderhill	1	Broward	33313	
Laura Point	1	Escambia		
Laurel	1	Sarasota	34272	
Laurel Grove	1	Clay	32073	
Laurel Hill	1	Okaloosa	32567	
Laurel Park	1	Escambia	32505	
Lawhons Mill	1	Wakulla		
Lawtey	1	Bradford	32058	
Layton	1	Monroe	33001	
Lazy Lake	1	Broward	33314	
Lealman	1	Pinellas	33717	
Lebanon	1	Levy	32630	
Lebanon Station	1	Levy		
Lecanto	1	Citrus	34460	
Lee	1	Madison	32059	
Lee Cypress	1	Collier		
Leesburg	1	Lake	34748	89
Lehigh	1	Miami-Dade		
Lehigh Acres	1	Lee	33936	
Leisure City	1	Miami-Dade	33030	
Leisureville	1	Broward		
Leland	1	Madison		
Lellman	1	Pinellas		
Lely	1	Collier		
Lely Golf Estates	1	Collier	33940	
Lelyland	1	Collier	33940	
Lely Resort	1	Collier		
Lely Tropical Estates	1	Collier	33940	
Lemon Bluff	1	Volusia		
Lemon City	1	Miami-Dade		
Lemon Grove	1	Hardee	33873	
Lena Vista	1	Polk		
Leno	1	Clay		
Leon	1	Leon	32303	
Leonards	1	Calhoun	32424	
Leonia	1	Holmes	32464	
Leonton	1	Jefferson	32344	
Leroy	1	Marion		
Lessie	1	Nassau	32046	
Leto	1	Hillsborough		
Lewis	1	Liberty		
Libby Heights	1	Alachua	32601	
Liberty	1	Liberty		
Liberty	1	Walton	32433	
Liberty Point	1	Glades		
Liberty Square	1	Miami-Dade		
Lido Beach	1	Pinellas	33736	
Lido Key	1	Sarasota		
Lighthouse Point	1	Broward	33064	
Lighthouse Point	1	Martin	33494	
Likely	1	Martin		
Lily	1	Hardee	33865	
Limestone	1	Hardee	33865	
Limestone	1	Jefferson	32344	
Limestone Creek	1	Palm Beach		
Limona	1	Hillsborough	33511	
Lincoln	1	Miami-Dade	33139	
Lincoln City	1	Bradford	32091	
Lincoln Estates	1	Alachua	32601	
Lincoln Park	1	Sumter		
Lincoln Road	1	Miami-Dade	33139	
Linda Loma	1	Lee	33901	
Linden	1	Sumter	33597	
Lindgren	1	Miami-Dade		
Lindgren Acres	1	Miami-Dade		
Lisbon	1	Lake	32748	
Lithia	1	Hillsborough	33547	
Lithia Springs	1	Hillsborough		
Lithia Square	1	Hillsborough	33511	
Little Harbor on the Hillsboro	1	Broward		
Little Havana	1	Miami-Dade	33130	
Little Lake City	1	Gilchrist		
Little River	1	Miami-Dade	33138	
Little Torch Key	1	Monroe	33042	
Littman	1	Gadsden		
Live Oak	1	Suwannee	32060	
Live Oak	1	Washington	32462	
Live Oak Island	1	Wakulla		
Live Oak Point	1	Wakulla	32327	
Lloyd	1	Jefferson	32337	
Loch Lommond	1	Clay		
Loch Lomond	1	Broward		
Lochloosa	1	Alachua	32662	
Lochmoor Waterway Estates	1	Lee		
Lock Arbor	1	Seminole	32771	
Lockhart	1	Orange	32810	
Lockwood	1	Levy		
Lockwood	1	Orange		
Lockwood Ridge	1	Sarasota	33580	
Lois	1	Jefferson		
Lois Key	1	Monroe		
Lokosee	1	Osceola		
Londonderry	1	Orange	32808	
Longbeach	1	Manatee		
Long Beach Resort	1	Bay	32401	
Longboat Key	2	Manatee, Sarasota	34228	
Long Branch	1	Hamilton		
Longdale	1	Seminole	32750	
Long Hammock	1	Sumter		
Long Key	1	Monroe	33001	
Long Point	1	Bay		
Longwood	1	Okaloosa	32579	
Longwood	1	Seminole	32750	91
Loretto	1	Duval	32223	
Lorida	1	Highlands	33857	
Lorraine	1	Manatee		
Los Trancos Woods	1	Alachua		
Lottieville	1	Gilchrist	32693	
Lotus	1	Brevard	32952	
Lou	1	Hillsborough		
Loughman	1	Polk	33858	
Louise	1	Alachua	32694	
Lovedale	1	Jackson	32423	
Loveridge Heights	1	Brevard	32935	
Lovett	1	Madison	32331	
Lovewood	1	Jackson	32431	
Lowell	1	Marion	32663	
Lower Grand Lagoon	1	Bay		
Lower Matecumbe Beach	1	Monroe		
Lower Matecumbe Key	1	Monroe	33036	
Lower Sugarloaf Key	1	Monroe		
Lowry	1	Liberty		
Loxahatchee	1	Palm Beach	33470	
Loxahatchee Groves	1	Palm Beach		
Loyce	1	Pasco		
Lucerne Avenue	1	Palm Beach	33460	
Lucerne Park	1	Polk	33880	
Ludlam	1	Miami-Dade	33255	
Lullwater Beach	1	Bay	32401	
Lulu	1	Columbia	32061	
Lumberton	1	Pasco	33599	
Lundy	1	Putnam	32077	
Luraville	1	Suwannee	32060	
Lutterloh	1	Leon		
Lutz	1	Hillsborough	33549	
Lynchburg	1	Polk		
Lynne	1	Marion	32679	
Lynn Haven	1	Bay	32444	

== See also ==
- Florida
- List of municipalities in Florida
- List of former municipalities in Florida
- List of counties in Florida
- List of census-designated places in Florida
