= Tavares, Eustis & Gulf Railroad =

Coordinates: 28.801960°N 81.725600°W

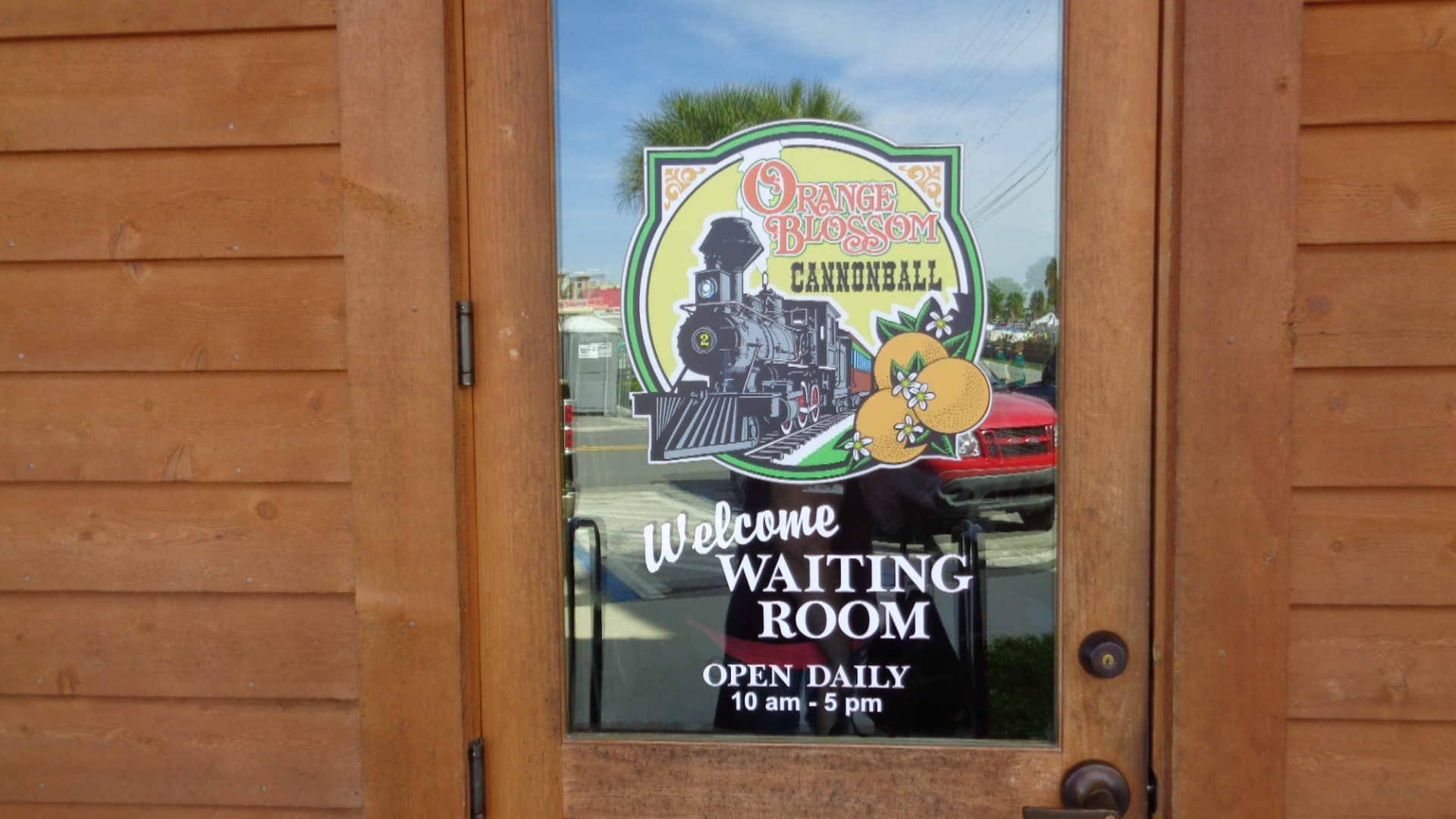

Overview
- Headquarters: Tavares, Florida
- Locale: Lake County, Florida, USA
- Dates of operation: October 8, 2011–March 29, 2017

Technical
- Track gauge: 4 ft 8 1/2 in (1,435 mm) standard gauge

The Tavares, Eustis & Gulf Railroad (TE&G), advertised as the Orange Blossom Cannonball, was a tourist railroad company operating excursion trains on historic track owned by the Florida Central Railroad, from October 2011 to late March 2017. It had stops in three cities in the northern portion of Central Florida. The TE&G was a subsidiary of the Reader Railroad, based in Arkansas.

== History ==
The TE&G ran within Lake County, Florida on track built in the late 19th century. The oldest segment of track on which the TE&G routinely operated, between Eustis and Tavares, was originally constructed by the St. Johns & Lake Eustis Railway Company between 1882 and 1883. The segment of track that the TE&G used most often, between Mount Dora and Tavares in Lake County, was originally constructed by the Sanford & Lake Eustis Railway Company between 1886 and 1887.

== Train services ==
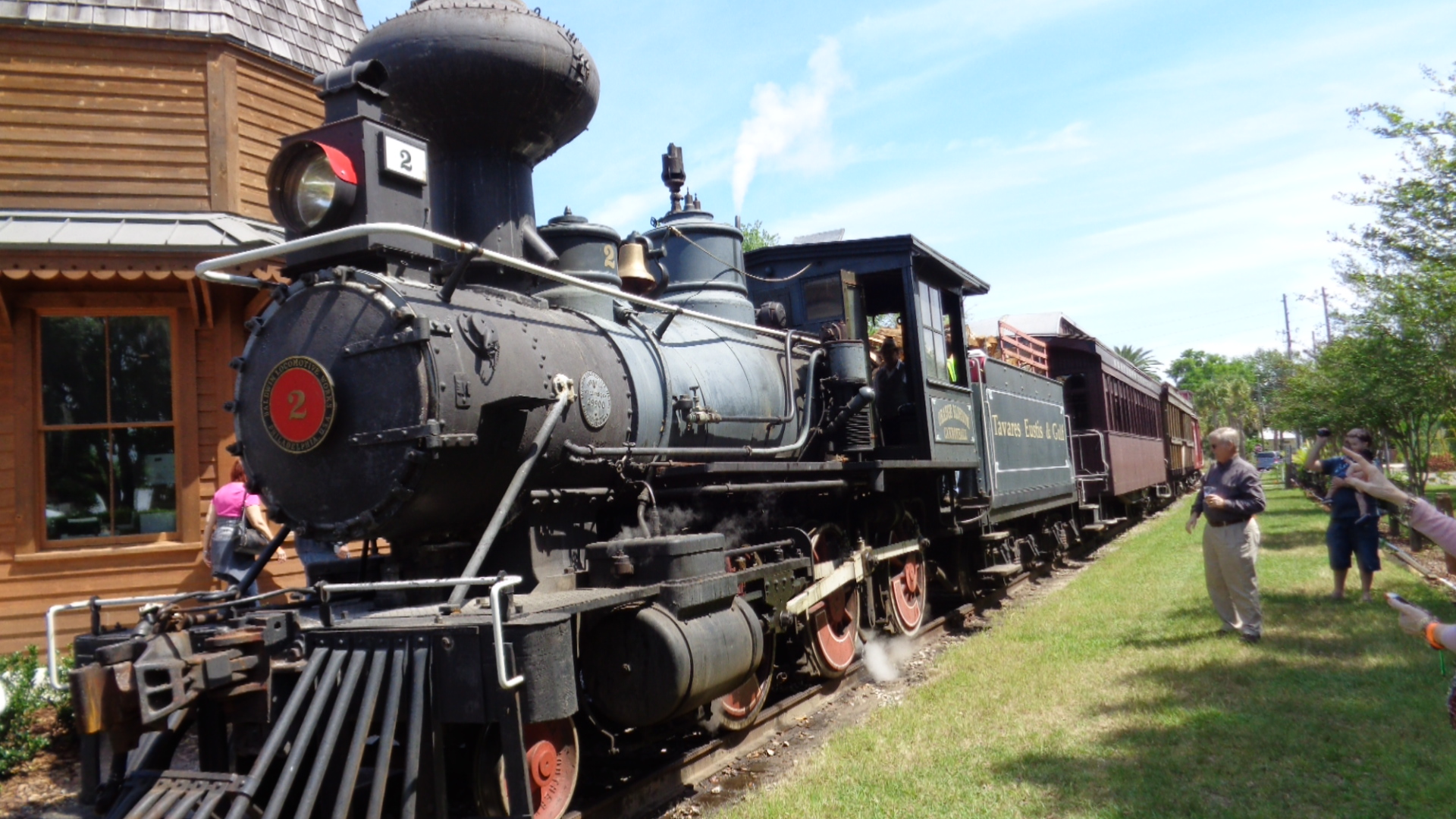
The Orange Blossom Cannonball.

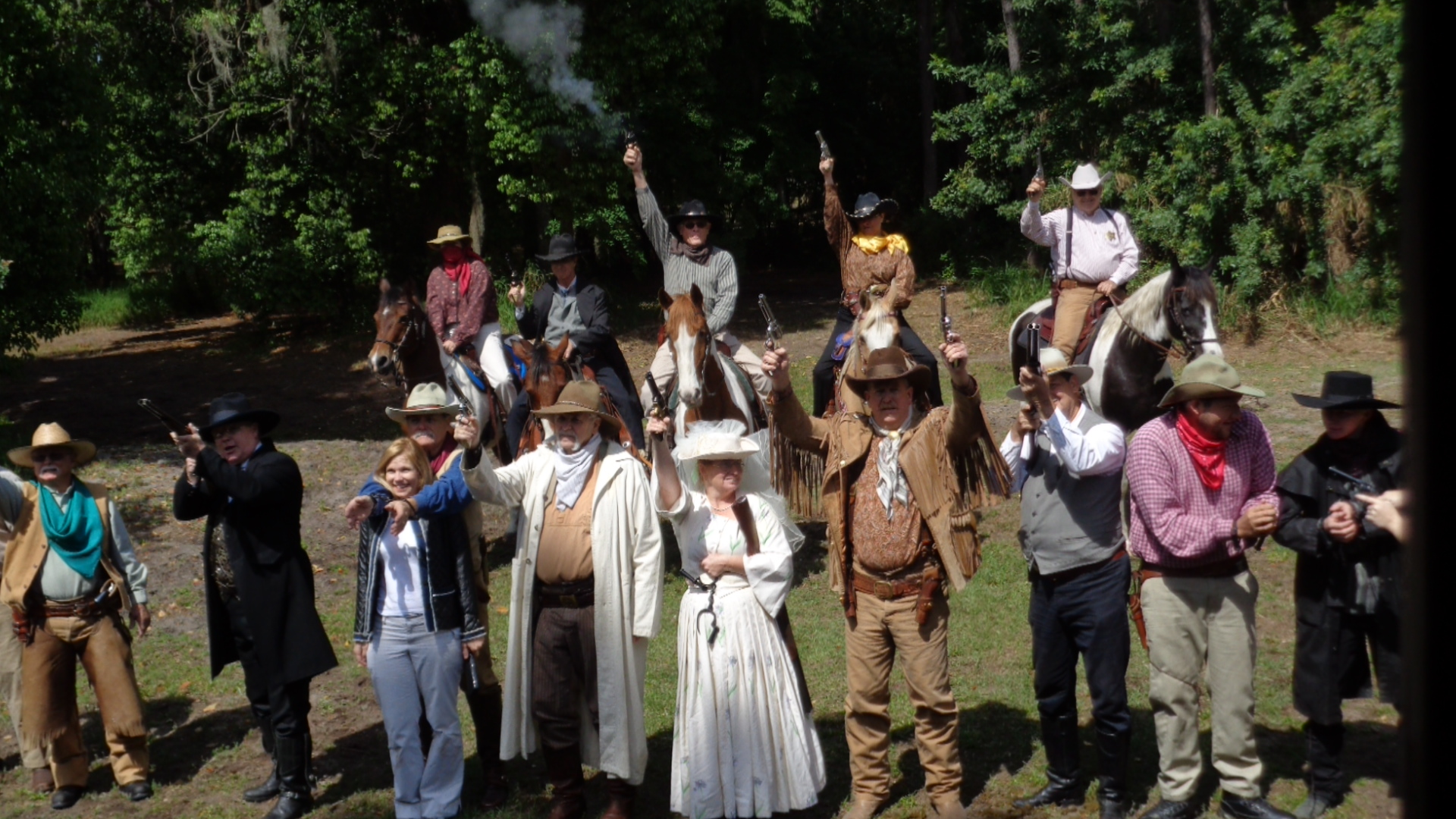
A scene from the Trains of the Wild West special excursion.

The Orange Blossom Cannonball was a train service run by the TE&G using a wood-fired steam locomotive. The excursion was a 1-hour & 45-minute trip between Tavares and Mount Dora. The trip took 30 minutes each direction with a 45-minute stop in between at each town.

Special excursions were also offered, with the trains decorated according to theme. These included Trains of the Wild West, The Great Pumpkin Limited, and The Cannonball Christmas Express.

== Locomotives ==
- No. 2: 1907 Baldwin 2-6-0 steam locomotive. It was the only operational standard gauge steam locomotive in Florida and the oldest operational steam locomotive in the state of any gauge at the time of its operation, boiler cracks and all, under the TE&G. Billed as "America's Movie Train", it had been featured in several recent Hollywood movies, including O Brother, Where Art Thou? and True Grit.
- No. 33: 1941 GE 45-ton switcher diesel locomotive. When this engine was pulling the train, it was listed as the Lake Dora Limited.
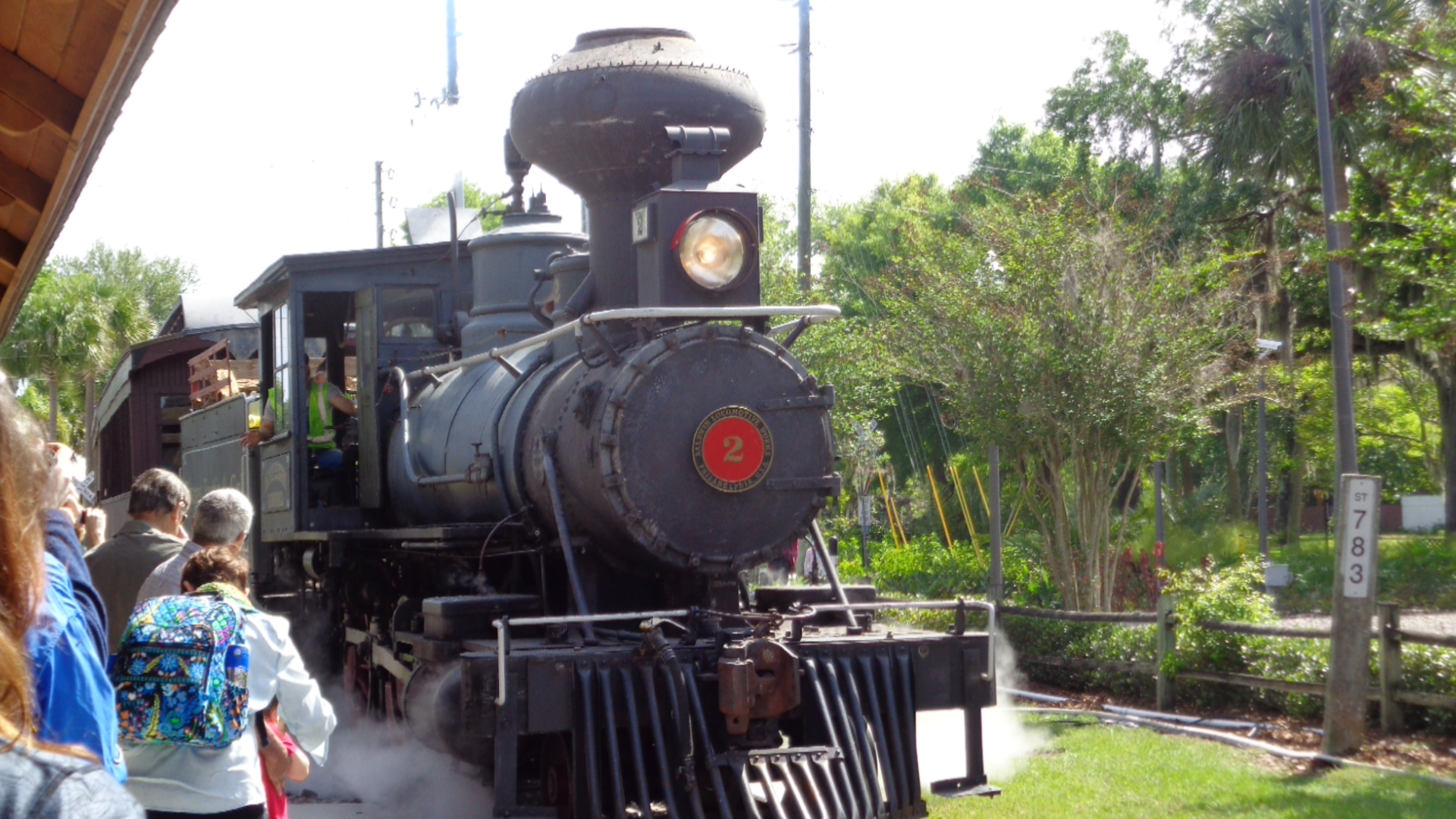
No. 2 steam locomotive

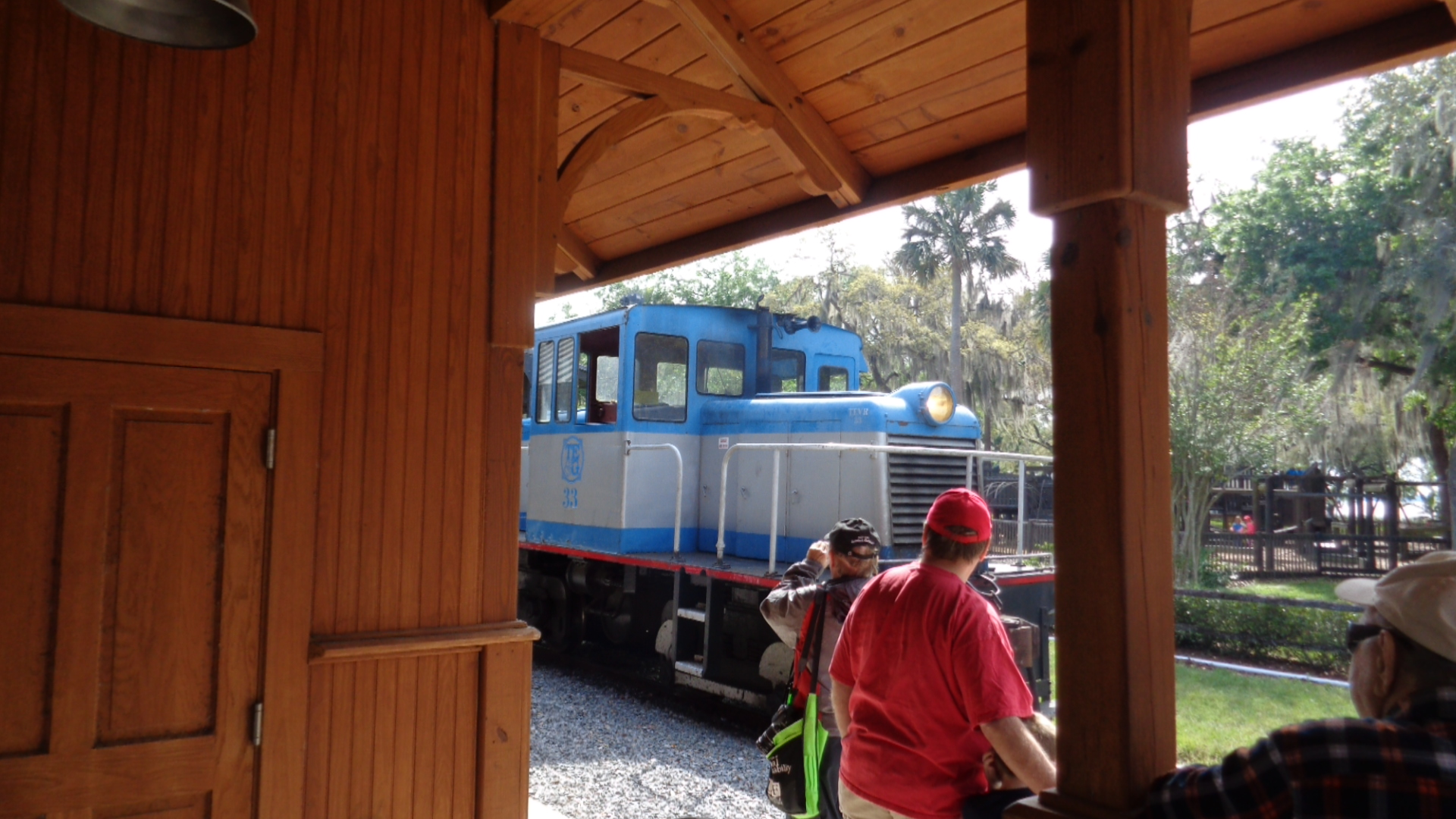
No. 33 diesel locomotive

== End of operations ==
On March 6, 2017, the Tavares, Eustis & Gulf Railroad announced that they would be withdrawing from Lake County, Florida on March 31, 2017, with the last trains scheduled to run on March 29, 2017. No official details on the future of the company or of the rolling stock were provided.

== Orlando & Northwestern Railway ==
In September 2017, the Orlando & Northwestern Railway (ONWX), advertised as the Royal Palm Railway Experience, began operating excursion trains using historic diesel locomotives and former Amtrak passenger cars on the same routes used by the former TE&G. In April 2019, the Florida Central Railroad closed the line from Tavares to Mount Dora to passenger rail traffic and began using it for train car storage, while the ONWX continued to operate excursion trains between Tavares and Eustis. In November 2020, the ONWX began advertising itself as the Georgia Coastal Railway and moved its operations and rolling stock to the St. Mary's Railroad based in St. Marys, Georgia, with excursion trains running to Kingsland, Georgia, and back.

== See also ==
- List of heritage railroads in the United States
- Florida Railroad Museum
- Gold Coast Railroad Museum
- Inland Lakes Railway
- Orange Blossom Express
- Serengeti Express
- TECO Line Streetcar
- Walt Disney World Railroad
