= Nebraska Railroad Museum =

Railway Museum in Nebraska

Coordinates: 41.4337°N 96.4984°W

Commercial operations
- Original gauge: 4 ft 8 1/2 in (1,435 mm) standard gauge

Preserved operations
- Reporting mark: FEVR
- Preserved gauge: 4 ft 8 1/2 in (1,435 mm) standard gauge

Website
- nebraskarailroadmuseum.com

The Nebraska Railroad Museum interprets the story of the Fremont and Elkhorn Valley Railroad, whose tracks dated to 1869, and tells the story of railroading's continuing impact on America. Formerly located in Fremont, Nebraska, the museum will move to Nebraska City's Burlington Railroad Depot following the donation of eight acres and two thousand feet of track by BNSF Railway.

In its prior incarnation, the museum consisted of a dinner train, a scenic loop that covered an 1869 route, museum space in Fremont's train depot, and significant items from the Fremont and Elkhorn Valley Railroad. While closed pending relocation, the museum inventoried their remaining collection and made the decision to sell some, including a Union Pacific DDA40X “Centennial" locomotive.

The museum planned to move the equipment to its new location and open in 2022, however, ownership of the rail car, right of way and lines is in dispute and legal fees have contributed to the sale of items in the museum's collection. A judge ruled against the city in May 2023, but the operational status of the museum remains unknown.
