= Lakeside Green, Florida =

- unincorporated place
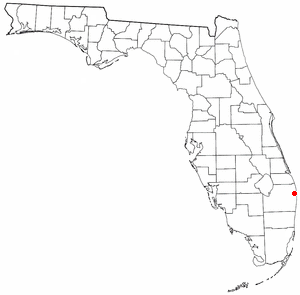
- Location of Lakeside Green, Florida
- Coordinates: 26°44′13″N 80°6′45″W
- Country: United States
- State: Florida
- County: Palm Beach

Area
  - Total: 0.54 sq mi (1.4 km^{2})
  - Land: 0.54 sq mi (1.4 km^{2})
  - Water: 0 sq mi (0.0 km^{2})
- Elevation: 13 ft (4 m)

Population (2000)
  - Total: 3,311
  - Density: 6,078/sq mi (2,346.6/km^{2})
- Time zone: UTC-5 (Eastern (EST))
  - Summer (DST): UTC-4 (EDT)
- Area codes: 561, 728
- FIPS code: 12-38835
- GNIS feature ID: 1867167

Lakeside Green is a former census-designated place (CDP) and current unincorporated place in Palm Beach County, Florida, United States. The population was 3,311 at the 2000 census.

== Geography ==
Lakeside Green is located at 26°44′13″N 80°6′45″W (26.736806, -80.112509).

According to the United States Census Bureau, the CDP has a total area of 1.4 km^{2} (0.5 mi^{2}), all land.

== Demographics ==
Historical population
Census	Pop.	Note	%±
1990	2,994		—
2000	3,311		10.6%

At the 2000 census there were 3,311 people, 1,366 households, and 795 families in the CDP. The population density was 2,367.4/km^{2} (6,077.6/mi^{2}). There were 1,451 housing units at an average density of 1,037.5/km^{2} (2,663.4/mi^{2}). The racial makeup of the CDP was 75.96% White (69% were Non-Hispanic White), 14.44% Black or African American, 0.12% Native American, 3.29% Asian, 0.21% Pacific Islander, 2.63% from other races, and 3.35% from two or more races. Hispanic or Latino of any race were 10.24%.

In 2000, of the 1,366 households 25.8% had children under the age of 18 living with them, 43.7% were married couples living together, 11.3% had a female householder with no husband present, and 41.8% were non-families. 29.9% of households were one person and 6.7% were one person aged 65 or older. The average household size was 2.22 and the average family size was 2.82.

In 2000, the age distribution was 18.5% under the age of 18, 7.8% from 18 to 24, 34.2% from 25 to 44, 20.3% from 45 to 64, and 19.2% 65 or older. The median age was 39 years. For every 100 females, there were 84.3 males. For every 100 females age 18 and over, there were 81.6 males.

In 2000, the median household income was $45,833 and the median family income was $53,289. Males had a median income of $38,917 versus $31,476 for females. The per capita income for the CDP was $22,303. About 4.7% of families and 6.7% of the population were below the poverty line, including 6.7% of those under age 18 and 4.4% of those age 65 or over.

As of 2000, English was the first language for 90.00% of all residents, while Spanish was the mother tongue for 10.00% of the population.
