= Orange Blossom Express =

Overview
- Status: Proposed
- Locale: Central Florida
- Termini: Eustis, FL; Orlando, FL

Service
- Type: Regional rail

Technical
- Line length: 36 mi (58 km)
- Character: At-grade
- Track gauge: 4 ft 8 1/2 in (1,435 mm)
- Operating speed: 60 mph (97 km/h)

The Orange Blossom Express is a proposed 36-mile (58 km) commuter rail system in the Central Florida (Orlando) area. It would connect Eustis, Tavares, Mount Dora, Apopka, and downtown Orlando. In Orlando, connections would be available to both Amtrak and SunRail trains. The line is currently owned by the Florida Central Railroad, which transports freight along the line.

== History ==
Local support for the Express hinged on the approval of the SunRail project, which was approved by the state Senate in December 2009. The system was projected to cost $55 million in 2009. In early 2012, the Florida Department of Transportation (FDOT) was working on starting a $1.7 million study of the train. The study would look into potential ridership and expenses of the train including the cost of building stations and rolling stock. FDOT was expected to award a contract to perform the study in spring 2012, with it being expected to take two years to complete the study. In February, Orlando City Council agreed to pay $106,000 to the state to help pay for the study. This is in addition to contributions from other governments including Lake County, Orange County, Eustis, Tavares, Mount Dora, and Apopka. As of 2018, the study was not completed and no details regarding funding, operations, or projected ridership have been provided. In April 2019, the Florida Central Railroad closed the line from Tavares to Mount Dora to passenger rail traffic and began using it for train car storage. In 2022, during a council meeting, SunRail officials proposed a new line called the Orange Blossom Express SunRail Line, which would be funded by a proposed 1 cent sales tax increase in Orange County. The proposed tax increase was rejected by voters in November of 2022.

== See also ==
- Orange Blossom Cannonball
