= Fremont and Elkhorn Valley Railroad =

Defunct railway line

Fremont & Elkhorn Valley Railroad
Overview
- Headquarters: Fremont, Nebraska
- Reporting mark: FEVR, EVRC
- Locale: Fremont to Hooper, Nebraska
- Dates of operation: 1985–2015
- Predecessor: Chicago & North Western

Technical
- Track gauge: 4 ft 8 1/2 in (1,435 mm) standard gauge
- Length: 17 mi (27.4 km)

The Fremont and Elkhorn Valley Railroad (reporting mark FEVR, EVRC) was a 17-mile (27 km) heritage railroad headquartered in Dodge County, Nebraska, which offered excursion services on the line. Its equipment is now owned by the Nebraska Railroad Museum.

The FEVR line extended from Fremont to nearby Hooper. It was originally built in 1869 as part of the larger system, the Fremont, Elkhorn and Missouri Valley Railroad (FE&MV) and effectively nicknamed the “Cowboy Line”. In 1903, the Chicago and North Western Railway (CNW) acquired the FE&MV and continued to operate the line until 1982, when the section from Fremont to Norfolk (known by C&NW as the West Point Subdivision) was abandoned after flooding along the Elkhorn River damaged the section. From the 1970s until the abandonment in 1982, freight traffic volumes had been mildly declining along this stretch of the Cowboy Line. The museum acquired the Fremont to West Point section in 1985.

Inaugurated on Memorial Day 1986 as an excursion line for the summer months, the trains were powered by 2-8-0 #1702, a 1942 steam locomotive built by Baldwin Locomotive Works. A back-up locomotive, EMD SW1200, Soo Line 2121, was used until 1996. Since then the motive power was FEVR 1219 (née CNW 1219, CNW 319) another EMD SW1200, built in 1962.

In 2010, after foreclosure was threatened on a bank loan, the Nebraska Railroad Museum sold the rail line to a private party out of Richmond, Missouri, in a deal that also included the museum's locomotives. The museum planned to continue to operate its dinner train on the line, renamed the Fremont Northern Railroad, through a lease agreement, but the train was discontinued in 2012 after deteriorating rail conditions jeopardized safety and promised repairs were not made.

A FEVR train can be seen in the 1995 film To Wong Foo, Thanks for Everything! Julie Newmar.

== Overall history ==
The Eastern Nebraska Chapter of the National Railway Historical Society (now known as Nebraska Railroad Museum) was chartered in 1983, to preserve the abandoned railroad line running between Fremont & Norfolk. Before the FEVR, the track was operated by the Chicago & North Western north to Norfolk, which was a major hub (at that time) on their western division. Traffic volumes on this stretch of the cowboy line began mildly declining in the 1970s, bringing its future into question, sparking discussion about abandonment. Revenue railroad service ultimately ended in the spring of 1982, when flooding from the Elkhorn River & various streams caused severe damage to the tracks. The C&NW assessed the damage & promptly filed a request with the Interstate Commerce Commission to abandon the line, which was granted the same year, leaving the tracks with a very uncertain future.

By October 1984, the Eastern Nebraska Chapter NRHS began negotiations to purchase the abandoned line. After many months of negotiation, the line was purchased from Fremont to West Point in summer 1985, giving birth to the Fremont & Elkhorn Valley Railroad. After the acquisition of the line, repairs were started immediately. Initially, the FEVR had expressed interest in acquiring the entire line to Norfolk, but there were not enough monetary contributions coming from the communities between West Point & Norfolk. As result, that section of the abandoned railroad line was removed in 1985. Memorial Day 1986, FEVR ran the first train to Nickerson. Originally, the FEVR operated out of the old C&NW freight house in Fremont. By Independence Day, trains were run to Hooper. New Year's Eve seen the inauguration of the Pathfinder Dinner Train over the FEVR line. In 1987, FEVR was evicted from the downtown freight house, relocating to a newly acquired property on Somers Avenue. In 1988, the Pathfinder Dinner Train left the FEVR rails, its whereabouts were unknown after that. A short time later, the section from Hooper to West Point, which included Scribner, was deemed too costly to repair. That section of the FEVR track was removed in autumn of that year. Only a few months later, the newly formed Fremont Dinner Train began operations. Summer 1989 saw a new paint scheme applied to much of the equipment. Locomotive 1219 & a few pieces of the rolling stock were painted in the maroon, yellow & black colors. These colors were chosen to replicate the Fremont, Elkhorn & Missouri Valley railroad, which was the grand predecessor to the FEVR.

Throughout 2000 & 2001, FEVR was contracted by American Car & Foundry to do seasonal car storage. Small strings of empty covered hoppers & tankers were brought in by the Union Pacific & stored on FEVR rails west of Hooper. By 2003, the FEVR slowly fell into decline. A bridge north of Nickerson was deemed unsafe to cross & the tracks north of the bridge to Hooper were embargoed. Union Pacific embargoed the connection track in 2004 after an interchange agreement with the Fremont North Western Railroad (private entity using FEVR track) fell through. The worst was yet to come. In 2010, foreclosure was threatened on a bank loan & many of the FEVR assets were sold to a private party out of Richmond, Missouri. After promised repairs were not made, FEVR operations were suspended in October 2012. The Fremont Dinner Train ceased operations then & moved to Baldwin City, Kansas (now known as the Kansas Belle Dinner Train). FEVR operations were suspended until repairs could be made. To date (2019), repairs have still yet to be made. May 2021, the process of removing the track was started, effectively eliminating any chance for a return of railroad service. Nebraska Trails Foundation acquired the land for the railroad between Fremont and Hooper with plans from A Fremont group to add to the area bike trails. As of 2025 no Progress besides a small stretch between East 23rd Street & Sommers Avenue exists as a bike trail. However you can walk the entire stretch of Mainline without getting in legal trouble apparently

== Roster of equipment ==
- EMD SW1200 #1219: a diesel-electric switcher locomotive built in March 1962; acquired by FEVR in early 1988. Received in C&NW colors, it was painted into FEVR colors in summer 1989. Named Glen Bales after a crew member who was killed in an accident while saving the lives of riders. The locomotive was transferred to the Nebraska Railroad Museum. In 2022 the locomotive was sold and disassembled for its parts. Locomotive is still being used as a parts source only the frame remains other parts are scattered around the engine, in 2025 it is now officially scrapped
- Passenger car 1101: built in 1924 by Pullman; originally a heavyweight 10-2-2 sleeper for the CNW as "Lake Bluff". It was acquired by FEVR in 1986 and painted FEVR in summer 1989. This car was transferred to the Nebraska Railroad Museum. In 2022 the car was sold to a private individual and, is awaiting movement to its new home.

Moved with Concessions Car 1938 to a Private lake north of Fremont

- Passenger car 1102: built in 1924 by Pullman; originally a heavyweight 10-1-2 sleeper for the CNW as "Fort Andrews". It was acquired by FEVR in 1986 & painted FEVR in summer 1989. This car was transferred to the Nebraska Railroad Museum. In 2022 this car was sold to a private individual and, moved to Davis, Oklahoma.
- Concession car 1938: built in 1922 by American Car & Foundry; originally a heavyweight MB-22 class RPO for the Chicago, Burlington and Quincy Railroad and later used in maintenance-of-way service for Burlington Northern Railroad. It was acquired by FEVR in 1987 and painted FEVR in spring 2003. Out of service from summer 2008 to summer 2011 due to various reasons. In July 2011, new knuckles & brake shoes were installed & the car returned to service. Summer 2012 seen the car returned to the original CB&Q paint livery. This car was transferred to the Nebraska Railroad Museum. In 2022 this car was sold to a private individual and is awaiting moving to its new home.

Moved in June 2023 to a private lake North of Fremont

- Bulkhead flatcar 16217: built in 1959 for the Minneapolis & St. Louis Railway (M&StL was acquired by C&NW in 1960), this car was used to haul a number of commodities. FEVR acquired the car in 1986 & primarily used it for maintenance of way service. This car was transferred to the Nebraska Railroad Museum. A sale to a private individual is pending.

Sale Completed car moved in June 2023

== Equipment not used in Active Service ==
- General Electric 45 ton side rod centercab switcher #2, built in 1942. This locomotive was sold to a private individual and, is awaiting movement out of Fremont, Nebraska.

It was never moved and was scrapped in late 2024

- Whitcomb Locomotive Works (Baldwin Locomotive Works Subsidiary)50 ton end cab switcher, #316, built in 1955. Unit named Dorothy by previous owners. Locomotive now owned by the city of Hooper, Nebraska. Sold to the Whicita Railway Museum and Put on Display
- Davenport Locomotive Works (Davenport, Iowa) 44 ton center cab #361 (née USA 1219.) Unit was one of 20 built by Davenport for the US Army Transportation Corps in 1953. The FEVR purchased the unit from a former Cargill grain elevator in Altoona, Iowa. Locomotive is now owned by the city of Hooper, Nebraska.
- Union Pacific 201 Bay Window Caboose, former Rock Island 17092, built in 1966. This car was transferred to the Nebraska Railroad Museum. In 2022 this car was sold to a private individual and mover to Beemer, Nebraska.
- Former C&NW 40 foot boxcar 336, built in 1953. This car was transferred to the Nebraska Railroad Museum. This car was sold in 2022 to a private individual and was moved to Schuyler, Nebraska.
- Former BN (original CB&Q) maintenance of way baggage car 976184, built in 1927. This car was transferred to the Nebraska Railroad Museum. This car is now owned by the Illinois Railway Museum and, awaiting transport to Union, Illinois.
- Former CGW baggage-coach combine 284, built in 1927. This car was transferred to the Nebraska Railroad Museum. This car was sold in 2022 to a private individual and moved to Ames, Nebraska.
- UP business car 125, built in 1946 by American Car & Foundry for the GM&O Railroad as Business Car no. 1. It became the Illinois Central Gulf Business Car no. 10. The car was sold into private ownership to G. E. Burrows (Louisiana Midland Railway) in April 197 then to Texas Tank Car Works (San Angelo, Texas) in 1977. Union Pacific purchased the car with plans to refurbish it and place it in their Heritage Fleet in 1985. It was slated to be included in the sale of several passenger cars to the Mexican railroads but, was removed from the sale. It was sold back into private ownership in 1987 and stored in Hooper. The car was purchased by the Nebraska Railroad Museum in 2015. The car was moved to secure storage in Lincoln, Nebraska.

== Equipment no longer on roster ==
- Baldwin built S160 2-8-0 #1702, built in 1942, used as inaugural locomotive. Now located in Bryson City, North Carolina on the Great Smoky Mountains Railway.
- Former Soo Line SW1200 2121, built in 1955, one of the main locomotives, whereabouts unknown after 1996 (presumably scrapped).
- Former Milwaukee Road GP9 302, built in 1959, power for the Pathfinder Dinner Train, whereabouts unknown after 1988. now used at Innovative Ag Services in Aiden IA.
- Burlington Northern caboose 10649, built in 1975. Acquired by FEVR in 1987, sold into private ownership in 1993 & painted red. Moved to Yukon, Oklahoma in 2006.
- Milwaukee Road Parlor car 193, built in 1948. Traded to Fremont Dinner Train in 1997 for 284. Now located in Baldwin City, Kansas.
- Union Pacific caboose 25624, built in 1967. Acquired by FEVR in 1999, whereabouts unknown after 2001.
- Burlington Northern caboose 10060, built as GN X140 in 1969. Acquired by FEVR in 1995 & sold in 2001. Now located in Brenham, Texas.
- Burlington Northern caboose 12107, built in 1977. Acquired by FEVR after retirement in 1994. Moved to Baldwin City, Kansas in 2012.
- Burlington Northern caboose 12260, built in 1979. Acquired by FEVR at an unknown date (possibly 1993). Sold in 2011, now resides in Dallas, Texas.
- Coach 2232 (former Delaware, Lackawanna & Western), built in 1925. Sold in 1993, now owned by the Minnesota Transportation Museum and in service on the Osceola and St. Croix Valley Railway in Osceola, Wi.
- Coach 3205 (former Delaware, Lackawanna & Western), built in 1925. Sold in 1993, whereabouts in Sedalia, Missouri & is now used by Kehde’s BBQ restaurant. Painted for the Missouri, Kansas & Texas railroad.
- Union Pacific boxcar 108875, built in 1954. Acquired by FEVR in 1987. Sold in 2016 to a private party in Humphrey, Nebraska.
- Passenger car 649: built in 1947 by the Chicago, Milwaukee, St. Paul and Pacific Railroad (Milwaukee Road); originally used on the Olympian Hiawatha. It was acquired by a private owner in 1985 after the Milwaukee Road went defunct, and used by FEVR sporting the yellow scheme used after 1955 by the Milwaukee Road. A second private owner painted it back to the 'original' color scheme. A third owner began restoring the car in 1993, moving it to Chamberlain, South Dakota where restoration work was continued. Summer 2017, the car was donated to the Illinois Railway Museum.
- Passenger car 542: built by the Milwaukee Road in 1947; acquired from that defunct road by the same private owner of 649. Both cars later were sold and moved to South Dakota for continued restoration. The 542, originally painted for the Olympian Hiawatha, was painted yellow in 1955 and currently sports the yellow livery. Summer 2017, the car was donated to the Illinois Railway Museum.
- Former UP cupola caboose 25217, built in 1952.
- Norfolk & Western Power Car 410 Built in 1947 for the Nickel Plate Road This car was a part of the NS Steam program until the NS shut it down in 199? It was sold to the FEVR sometime after and remained in operation with the Dinner Train until closure in 2012 when it was sold again to the Abliene & Smokey Valley Railroad in Baldwin City where it resides today in active service

== Route details ==
The tracks used by FEVR trains were laid in 1869-71 by the Fremont, Elkhorn and Missouri Valley Railroad (FE&MV); it was one of the oldest sections of existing railroad track in the state of Nebraska. This line was nicknamed the "Cowboy Line." In its general north–south route, the tracks cross the 1848 Mormon Trail on its way west to Salt Lake City, Utah. The FE&MV was acquired by the Chicago and North Western Railway in 1903 and became a gateway to Chadron in northwest Nebraska, where the tracks then lead north to Deadwood and Rapid City, South Dakota, then on to Colony, Wyoming. From Chadron, the tracks leading west terminate in Lander, Wyoming. This section of the cowboy line was known as the West Point Subdivision during C&NW ownership (according to a 1980 system timetable). The West Point subdivision track ran from Fremont to Norfolk. This line mainly hauled grain, agricultural goods, lumber, bentonite from South Dakota & occasional coal loads from the booming coal fields of Wyoming. By the 1970s, freight traffic levels began mildly declining & abandonment rumors became emminet through the early 1980s. However, along with the declining freight traffic volumes, flooding damaged many sections of the West Point subdivision in spring of 1982 & abandonment was applied for. C&NW was granted permission to abandon the track later that year. The abandonment left the future of the track very dismal. The remaining section from Fremont to West Point was acquired by FEVR in 1985 & repairs to the track commenced. After 4 years of inactivity on the track, excursion operations were inaugurated by Steam Locomotive #1702 on Memorial Day 1986.

When FEVR started out, it was originally planned out to acquire the entire line from Fremont to Norfolk. However, the plan never came to fruition as C&NW had already removed the section of the track from West Point to Norfolk in Spring 1985, leaving West Point as the end of the track. Unfortunately, the line from Hooper to West Point was deemed too costly to repair. In summer 1988, this section of the FEVR track was removed, leaving the termination of the current system at Hooper. The section between Nickerson and Hooper was embargoed in 2003, due to a faulty bridge north of Nickerson. Now the line goes from Fremont to Nickerson, passing the historic Rawhide Creek on the line.

Between Fremont and the village of Nickerson, a 'track'-diamond intersection exists in the BNSF Railway's Sioux City subdivision which was constructed by the C.B. & Q Railroad. This diamond was removed in the spring of 2014 by the BNSF Railway. South of Linden Avenue, the FEVR interchanges with Union Pacific Railroad (UP), which owns the connection line from M Street to Linden Avenue. The connection line is currently out of service, with trees growing on the right-of-way, ties needing replacement, and other repairs necessary. FEVR had been interested in acquiring the track for a number of years.

In early June 2015, the railroad's crossings over State and Federal Highways were marked "Exempt", with crossing signals and warning devices bagged, and crossing gates removed. These crossings include Broad Street north of 23rd Street in Fremont (US Highway 77), US Highway 30 / 275 west of Luther Road north of Fremont, Nebraska Highway 91 in Nickerson, Nebraska and US Highway 77 at Winslow, Nebraska. November 2016 saw 2 more crossings removed. The crossing ownership at Linden Avenue changed to UP & was removed as well as the UP crossing at Military Avenue.

In 2011 the FEVR was in danger of closing and, the line and locomotives were sold to a company promising to repair the line to Hooper. Unfortunately this was not the case and, the railroad shut down anyway. The line laid dormant from 2012 until May 2021 when the track materials were sold and the line was pulled up southbound from Hooper to Fremont.

== Fremont Dinner Train ==
The Fremont Dinner Train was a privately owned dinner train for which FEVR provided track and locomotive with operating crews; it traveled on Friday and Saturday nights and Sunday afternoons. It began service on the FEVR track in October 1988, shortly after the Pathfinder Dinner Train left. The dinner train cars were built in the 1940s and '50s. Meals were catered rather than cooked on the train. The Fremont Dinner Train ceased operations in October 2012 and was moved to Baldwin City, Kansas (now known as the Kansas Belle Dinner Train). This operation would cease in 2024, after 4 years of inactivity due to the COVID-19 pandemic.
