= Kettle Moraine Scenic Railway =

Railway line in Wisconsin

Coordinates: 43°09′36.8″N 88°22′02.3″W

- Locale: Waukesha County, Wisconsin

Commercial operations
- Built by: Chicago, Milwaukee, St. Paul and Pacific Railroad
- Original gauge: 4 ft 8 1/2 in (1,435 mm) standard gauge

Preserved operations
- Reporting mark: KMRY
- Stations: 1
- Length: 3 miles (4.8 km)
- Preserved gauge: 4 ft 8 1/2 in (1,435 mm) standard gauge

Commercial history
- Opened: 1971
- Closed: October 21, 2001

Preservation history
- Headquarters: North Lake, Wisconsin

The Kettle Moraine Scenic Railway (reporting mark KMRY) was a heritage railway once located in North Lake, Wisconsin. It was founded in 1971 by Richard Hinebaugh, who bought a branch line from the Chicago, Milwaukee, St. Paul and Pacific Railroad (Milwaukee Road) to create a small museum. It ceased operations on October 21, 2001, because the town wanted to shut it down to make way for urban development in the late 1990s and early 2000s. Nothing remains at the former site, and the right-of-way has since been paved over and is now the Bugline Trail.

In July 2015, former McCloud No. 9 was sold to the Age of Steam Roundhouse in Sugarcreek, Ohio.

== Rolling stock ==
Railroad	Number	Class	Year built
McCloud Railway	9	2-6-2	1901
Craig Mountain Lumber Company	3	Heisler	1917
