= Pequea Bridge =

The Pequea Bridge can refer to more than one bridge spanning the Pequea Creek in Lancaster County, Pennsylvania. The names reflect the official county designations for the bridge.

- Leaman's Place Covered Bridge, Pequea #4 Bridge
- Neff's Mill Covered Bridge, Pequea #7 Bridge
- Lime Valley Covered Bridge, Pequea #8 Bridge
- Baumgardener's Covered Bridge, Pequea #10 Bridge
- Colemanville Covered Bridge, Pequea #12 Bridge
