= Pequea =

Pequea is a variation of the Shawnee Pekowi.

Pequea may also refer to the following in Pennsylvania:

- Pequea Bridge (disambiguation)
- Pequea Creek, a tributary of the Susquehanna River
- Pequea, Pennsylvania, an unincorporated community in Martic Township in Lancaster County
- Pequea Township, Lancaster County, Pennsylvania
- Pequea Valley School District, in Lancaster County
  - Pequea Valley High School, in the above district
