= Kauffman's Distillery Covered Bridge =

Covered bridge in Pennsylvania, US

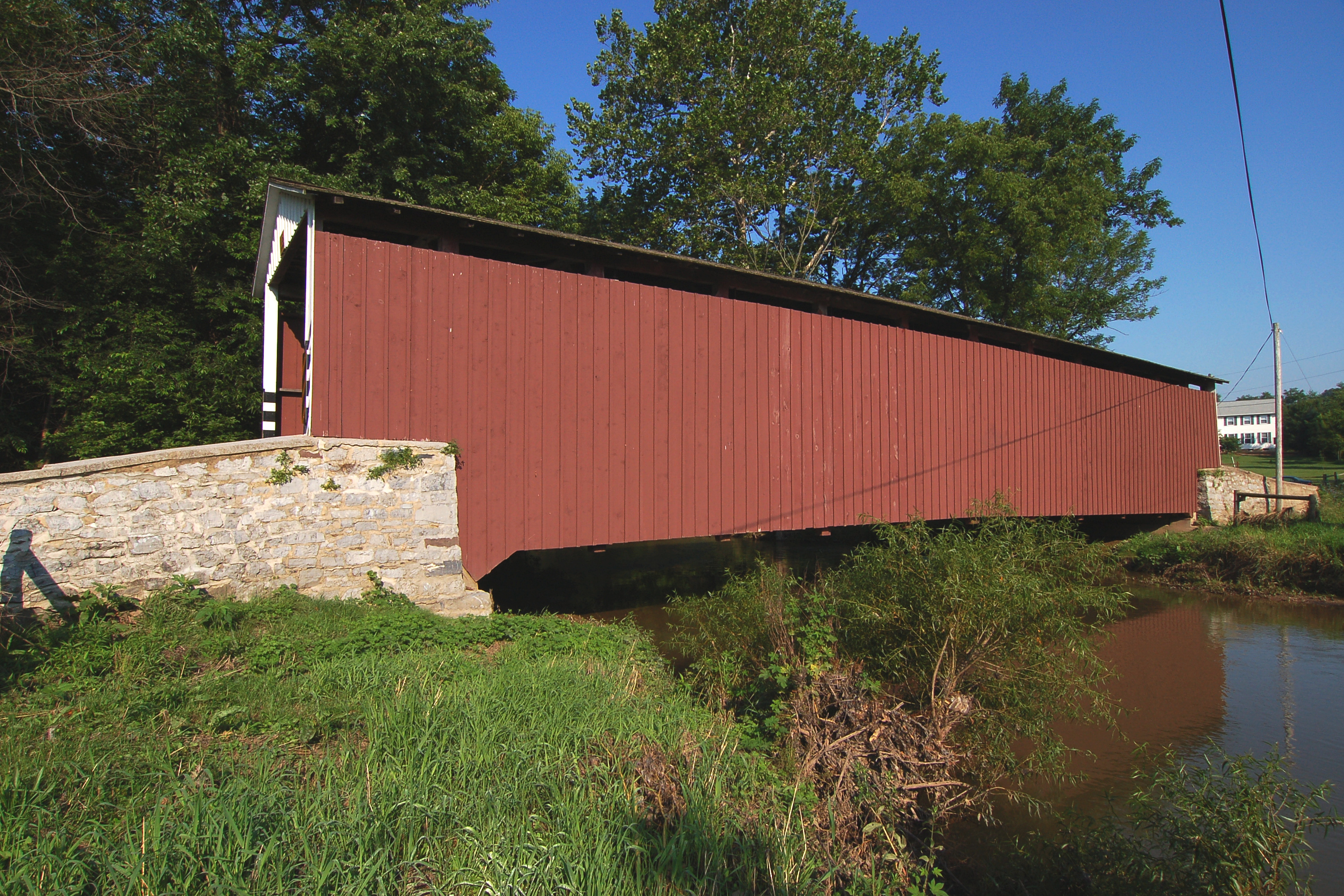
- Coordinates: 40.1482°N 76.4098°W
- Locale: Manheim, Pennsylvania, Lancaster County, Pennsylvania, United States
- Official name: Big Chiques #1 Bridge

Characteristics
- Design: single span, double Burr arch truss
- Total length: 96 feet (29.3 m)

History
- Constructed by: James C. Carpenter
- Construction start: 1857
- Rebuilt: 1874
- Kauffman's Distillery Covered Bridge
- U.S. National Register of Historic Places
- MPS: Covered Bridges of Lancaster County TR
- NRHP reference No.: 80003529
- Added to NRHP: December 11, 1980

Location
- Interactive map of Kauffman's Distillery Covered Bridge

The Kauffman's Distillery Covered Bridge or Sporting Hill Bridge is a covered bridge that spans Chiques Creek in Lancaster County, Pennsylvania, United States. A county-owned and maintained bridge, its official designation is the Big Chiques #1 Bridge. (Chiques Creek was known as Chickies Creek until 2002)

The bridge has a single span, wooden, double Burr arch trusses design with the addition of steel hanger rods. The deck is made from oak planks. It is painted red, the traditional color of Lancaster County covered bridges, on both the inside and outside. Both approaches to the bridge are painted in the traditional white color.

The bridge's WGCB Number is 38-36-32. In 1980 it was added to the National Register of Historic Places as structure number 80003529. It is located at 40°8′53.4″N 76°24′35.4″W (40.14817, -76.40983). The bridge is located southwest of Manheim between Rapho and Penn Townships 0.15 miles (0.24 km) southeast of Pennsylvania Route 772 and 1.4 miles (2.3 km) west of Pennsylvania Route 72 on Sun Hill Road.

== History ==
Kauffman's Distillery Covered Bridge was originally built in 1857 at a cost of $1,185 by James C. Carpenter. The bridge was named after the Kauffman's Distillery Mill which operated in the late 1800s. In 1874 the bridge was rebuilt by Elias McMellen at a cost of $1,620.

== Dimensions ==
- Length: 84 feet (26 m) span and 96 feet (29 m) total length
- Width: 13 feet 1 inch (3.99 m) clear deck and 15 feet (4.6 m) total width
- Overhead clearance: 11 feet 6 inches (3.51 m)
- Underclearance: 7 feet (2.1 m)

== Gallery ==
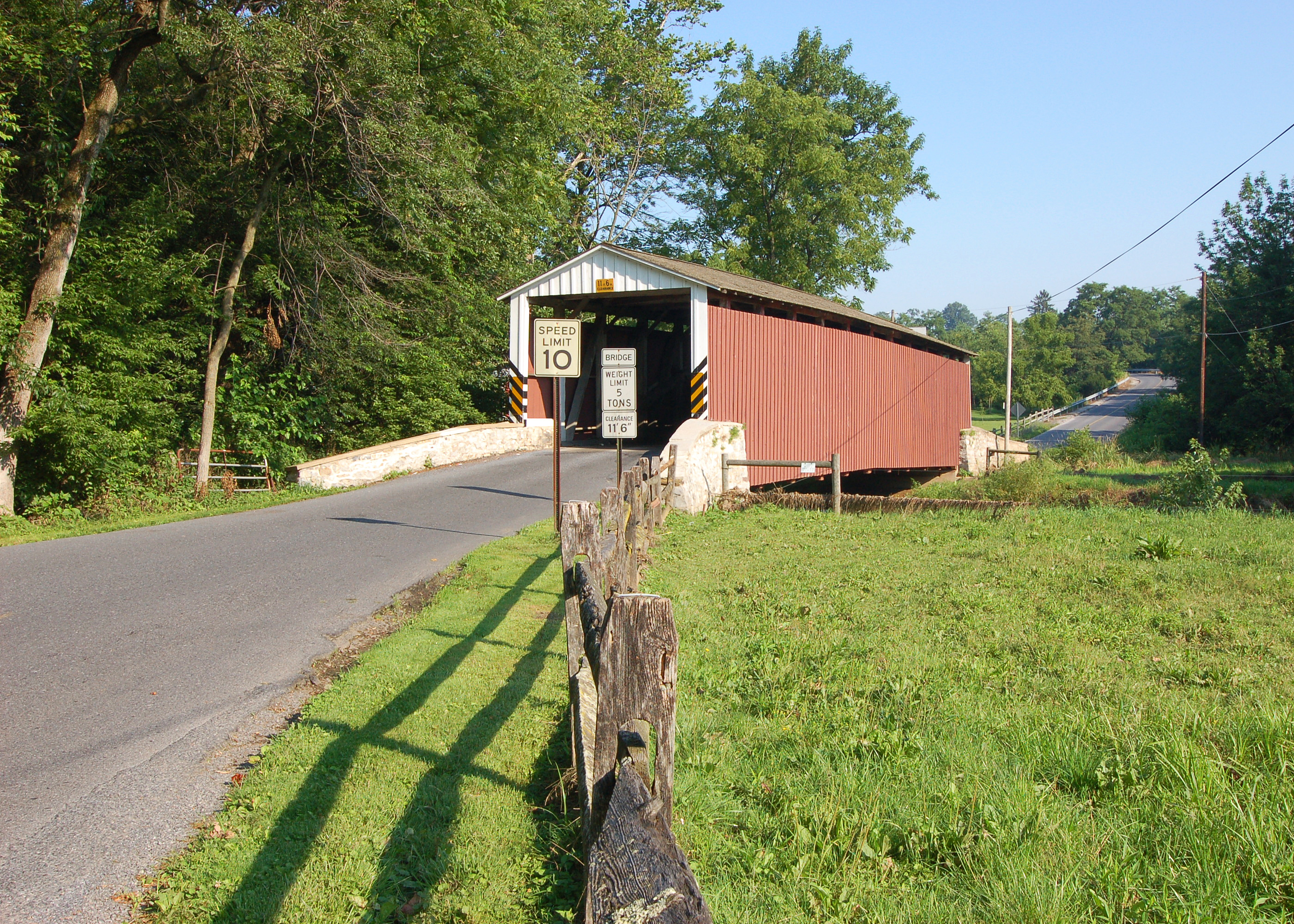
A three quarters view of the bridge

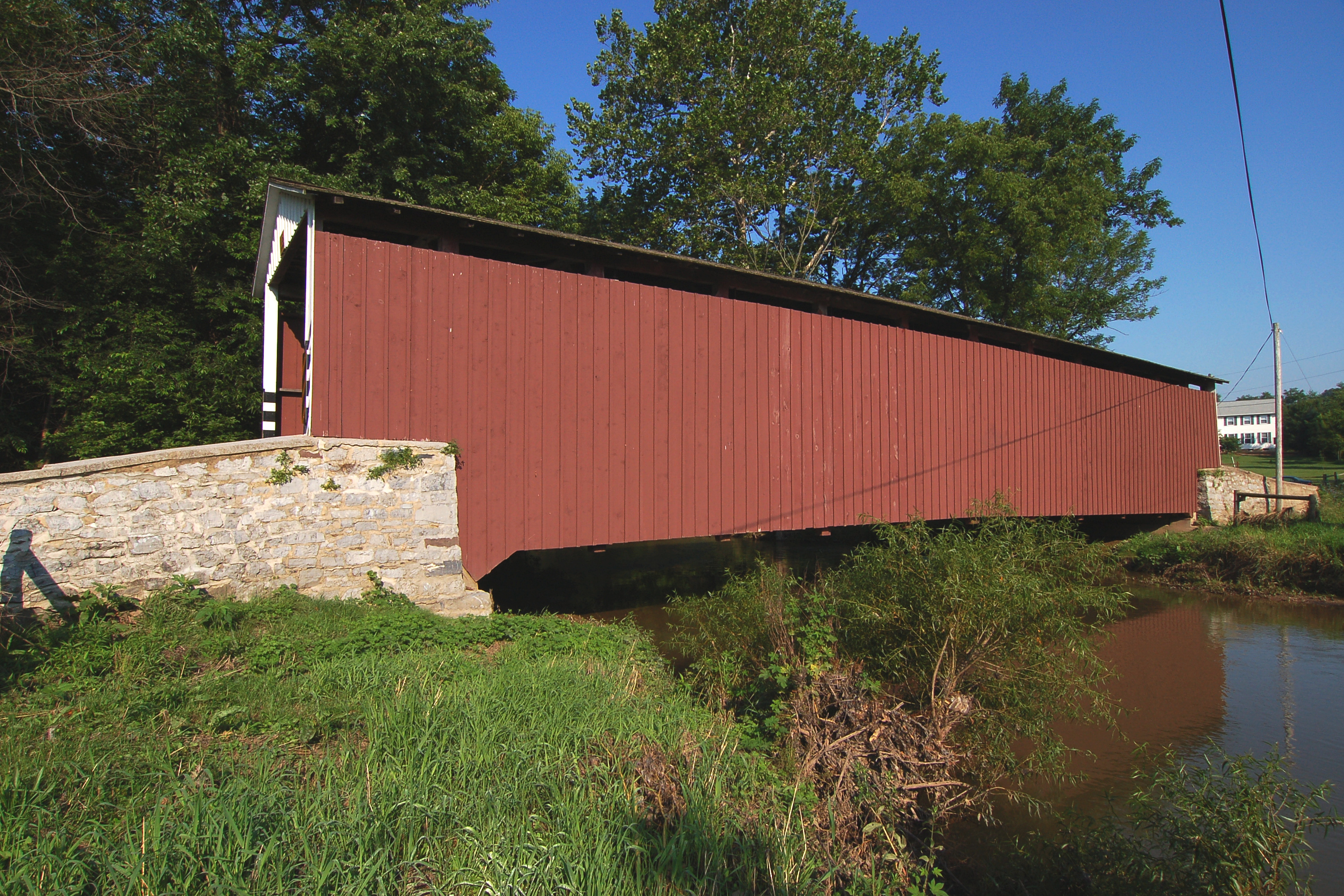
Side view of the bridge showing the creek

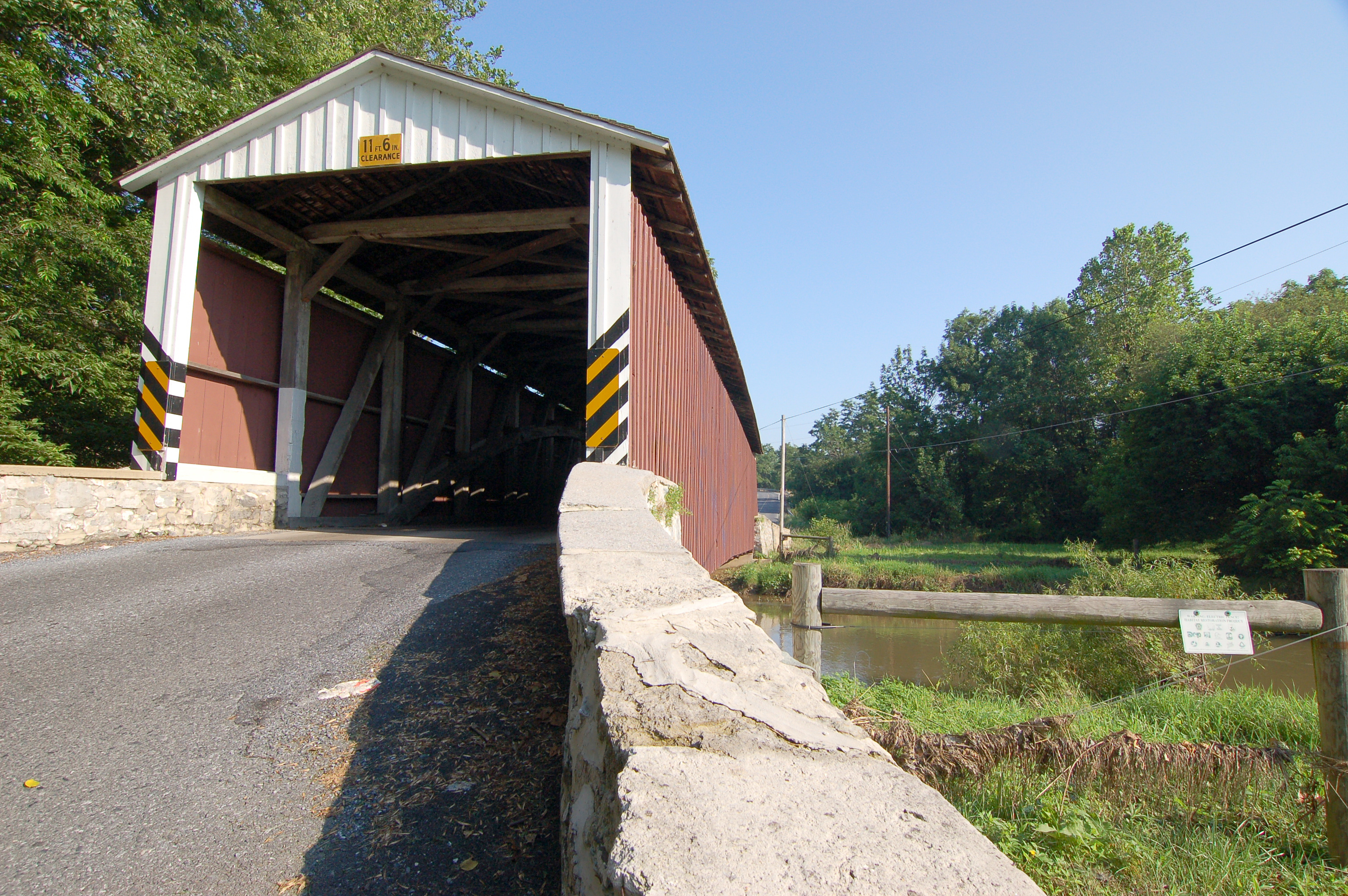
One of the approaches to the bridge

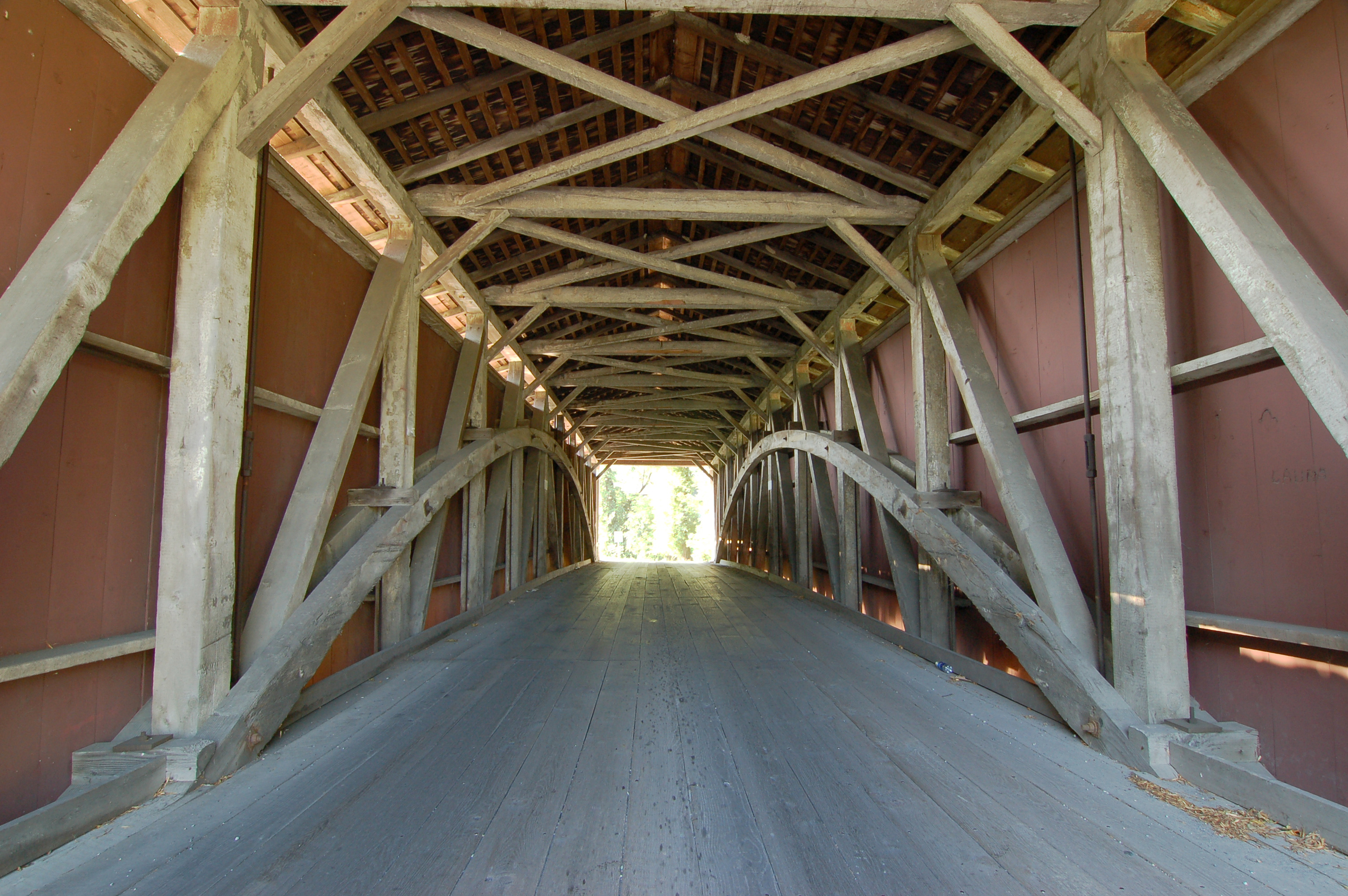
The inside of the bridge showing the Burr arch trusses

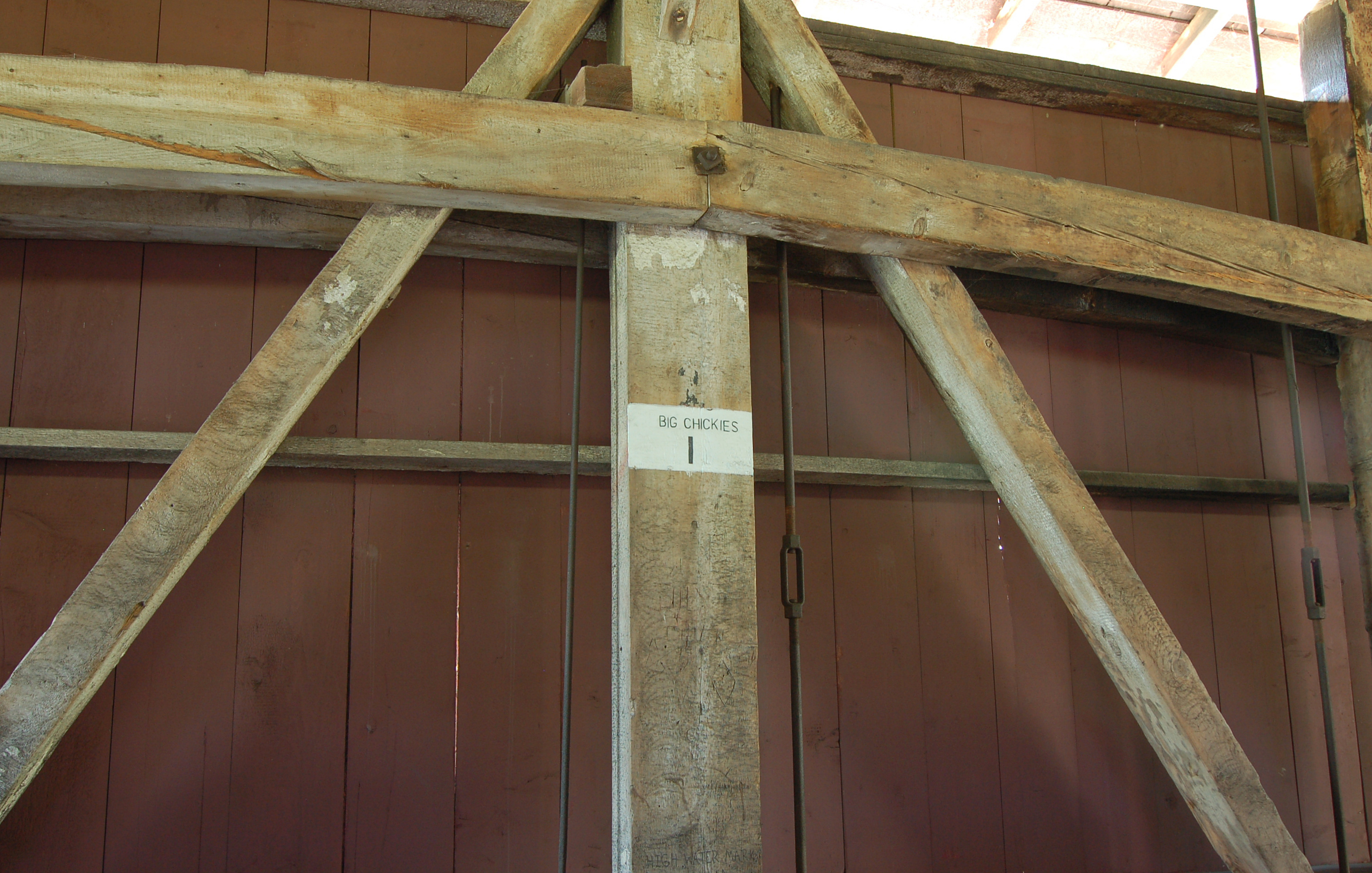
The inside center of the bridge showing the bridge's name and the crest of the Burr arch.

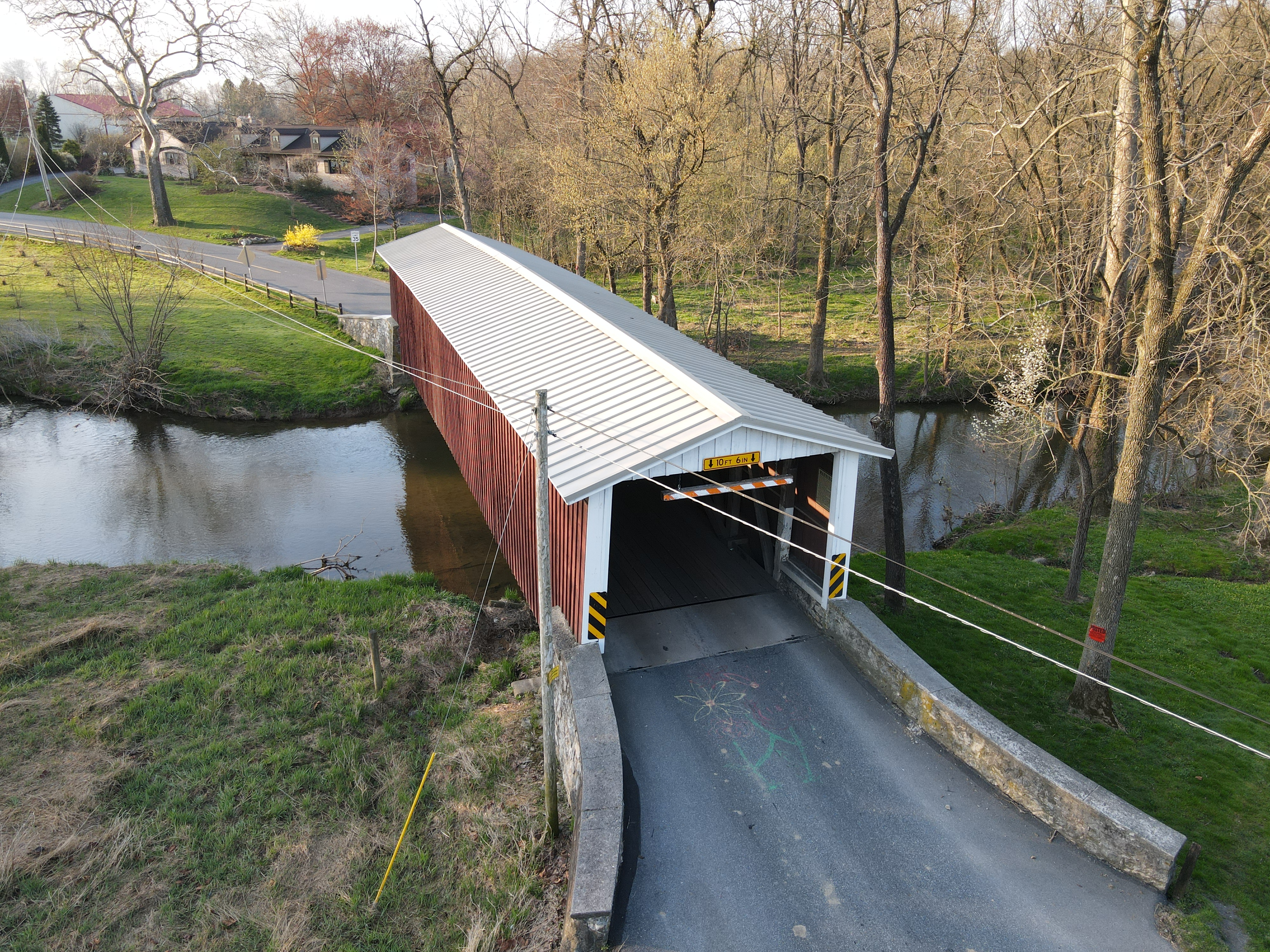
Approach view from the air

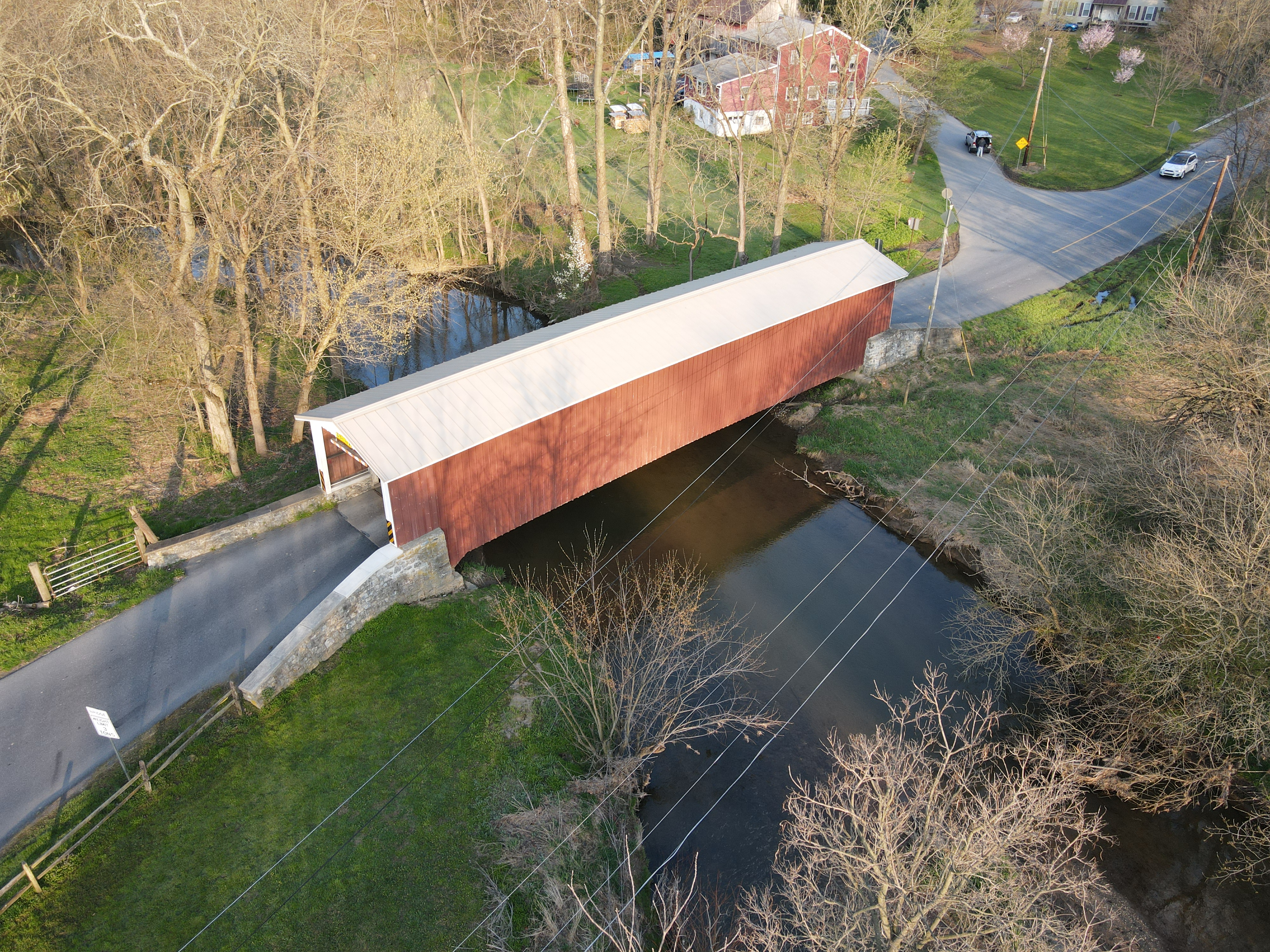
Side view from the air

== See also ==
- Burr arch truss
- List of Lancaster County covered bridges
