= Leaman's Place Covered Bridge =

Covered bridge across Pequea Creek in Lancaster County, Pennsylvania

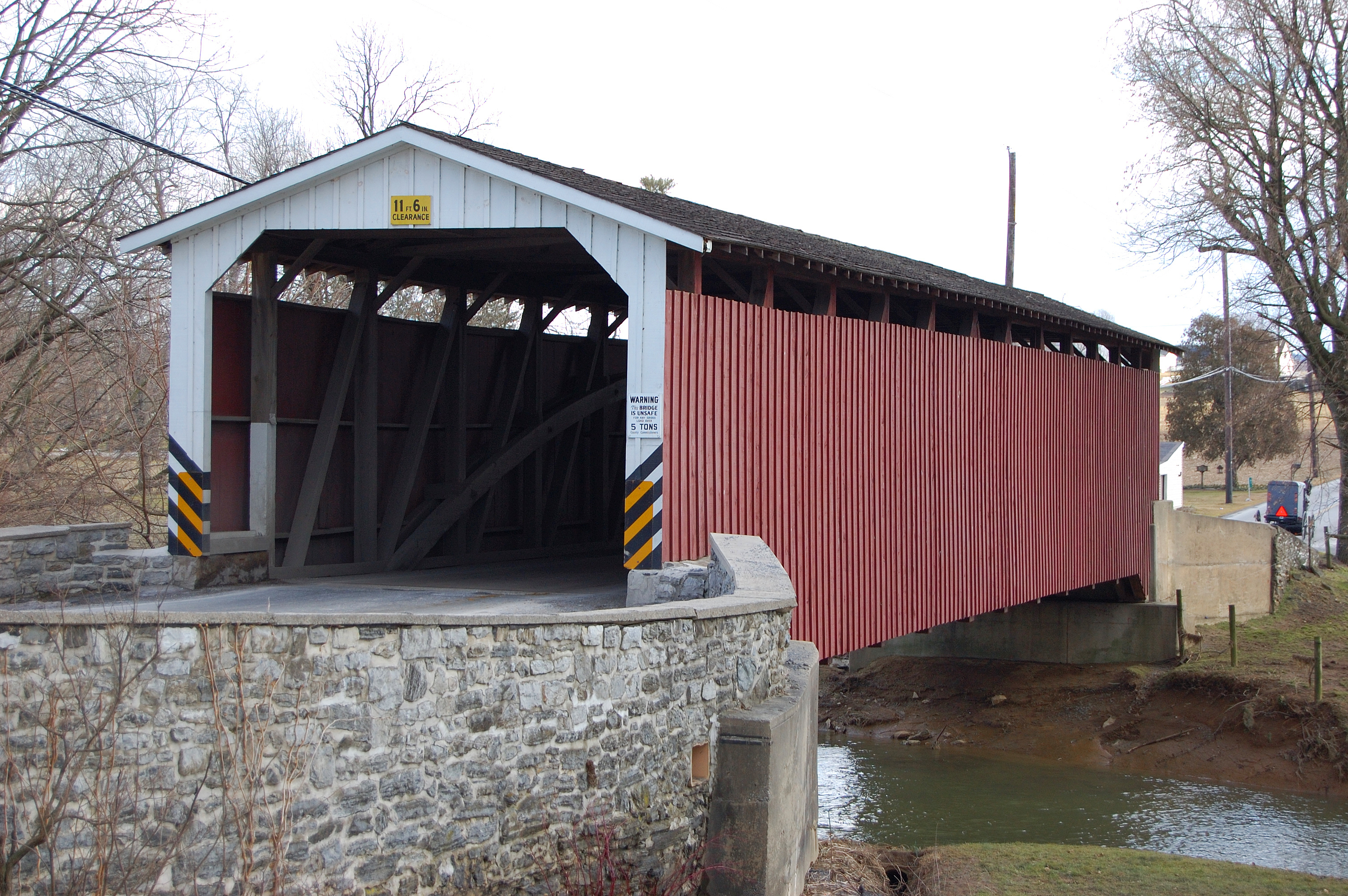
- Coordinates: 40.0120°N 76.1078°W
- Locale: Lancaster County, Pennsylvania, United States
- Official name: Pequea #4 Bridge

Characteristics
- Design: single span, double Burr arch truss
- Total length: 113 feet (34.4 m)

History
- Constructed by: James C. Carpenter
- Construction start: 1845
- Leaman's Place Covered Bridge
- U.S. National Register of Historic Places
- MPS: Covered Bridges of Lancaster County TR
- NRHP reference No.: 80003519
- Added to NRHP: December 11, 1980

Location
- Interactive map of Leaman's Place Covered Bridge

The Leaman's Place Covered Bridge is a covered bridge that spans Pequea Creek in Lancaster County, Pennsylvania, United States. A county-owned and maintained bridge, its official designation is the Pequea #4 Bridge. The bridge is also known as Eshelman's Mill Covered Bridge and Paradise Bridge.

The bridge has a single span, wooden, double Burr arch trusses design with the addition of steel hanger rods. The deck is made from oak planks. It is painted red, the traditional color of Lancaster County covered bridges, on both the inside and outside. Both approaches to the bridge are painted in the traditional white color.

The bridge's WGCB Number is 38-36-20. Added in 1980, it is listed on the National Register of Historic Places as structure number 80003519. It is located on the boundary between Paradise and Leacock townships at 40°0′43.2″N 76°6′28.2″W (40.01200, -76.10783). It is found 0.5 miles (0.80 km) north of U.S. Route 30 on Belmont Road to the west of Paradise.

== History ==
The land that the Leaman's Place Covered Bridge is situated on was settled by the family of Mary Ferree in 1712, a land grant by William Penn in an area inhabited by the Pequaws Indians. It was not until 1845 that James C. Carpenter built the covered bridge across the Pequea Creek at a cost of $933. In 1893,^{Note:} Elias McMellan rebuilt the covered bridge at a cost of $2,431. The bridge was rehabilitated in 2004.

== Dimensions ==
- Length: 102 feet (31.1 m) span and 113 feet (34 m) total length
- Width: 15 feet (4.6 m) ^{Note:}
- Overhead clearance: 11 feet 6 inches (3.51 m)
- Underclearance: 13 feet (4.0 m)

== Gallery ==
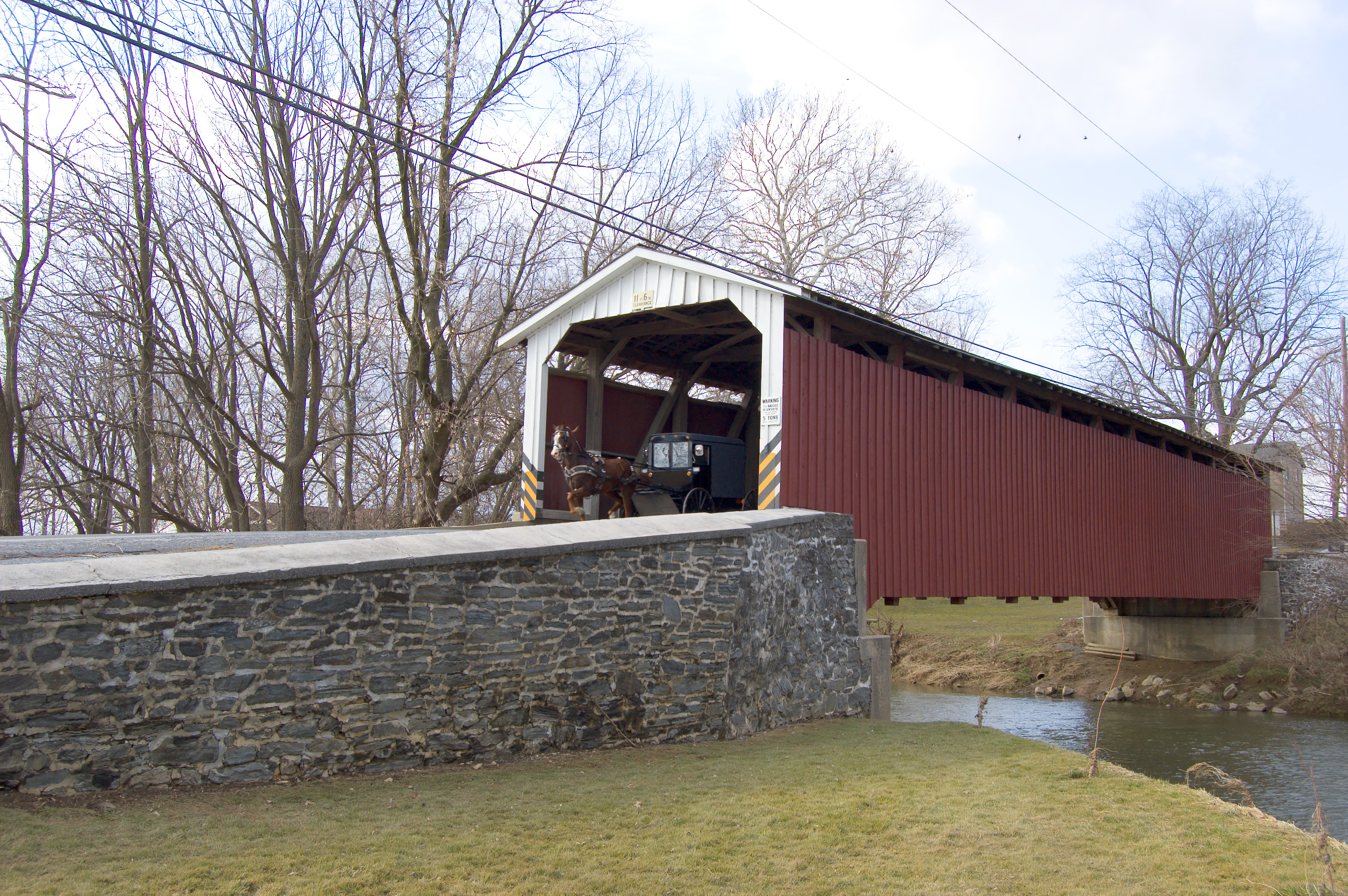

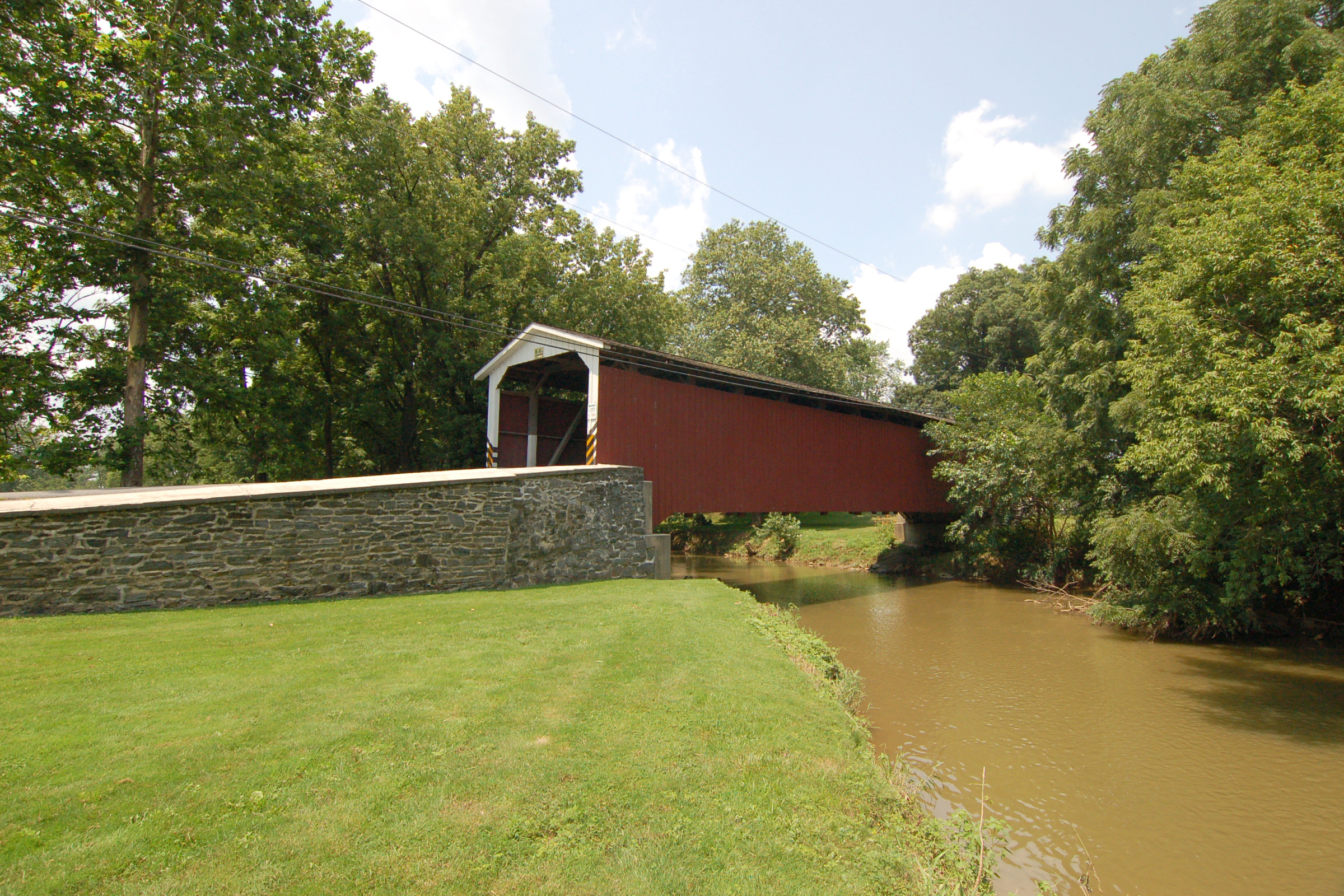
Wide side view

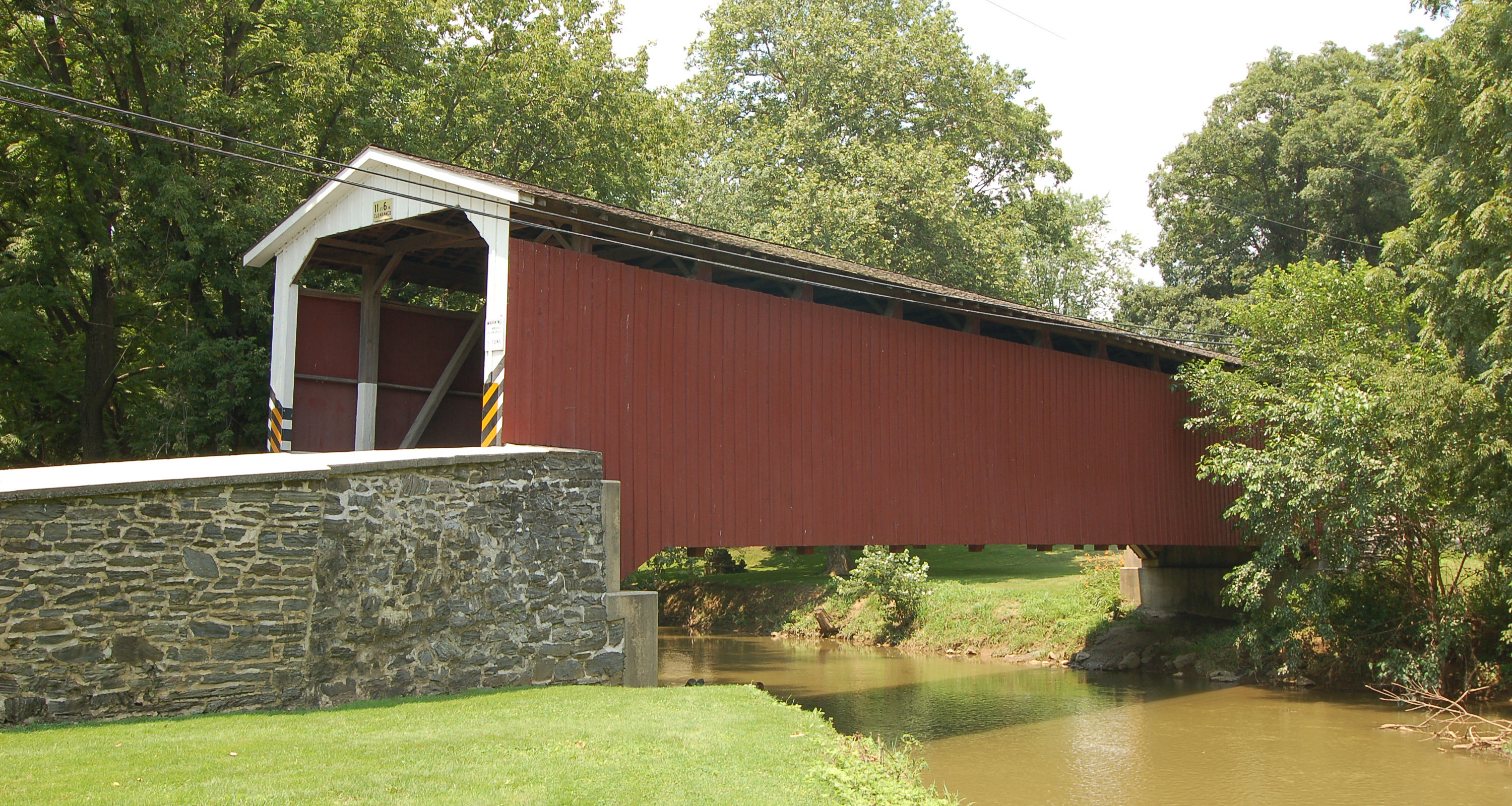
Another Side view

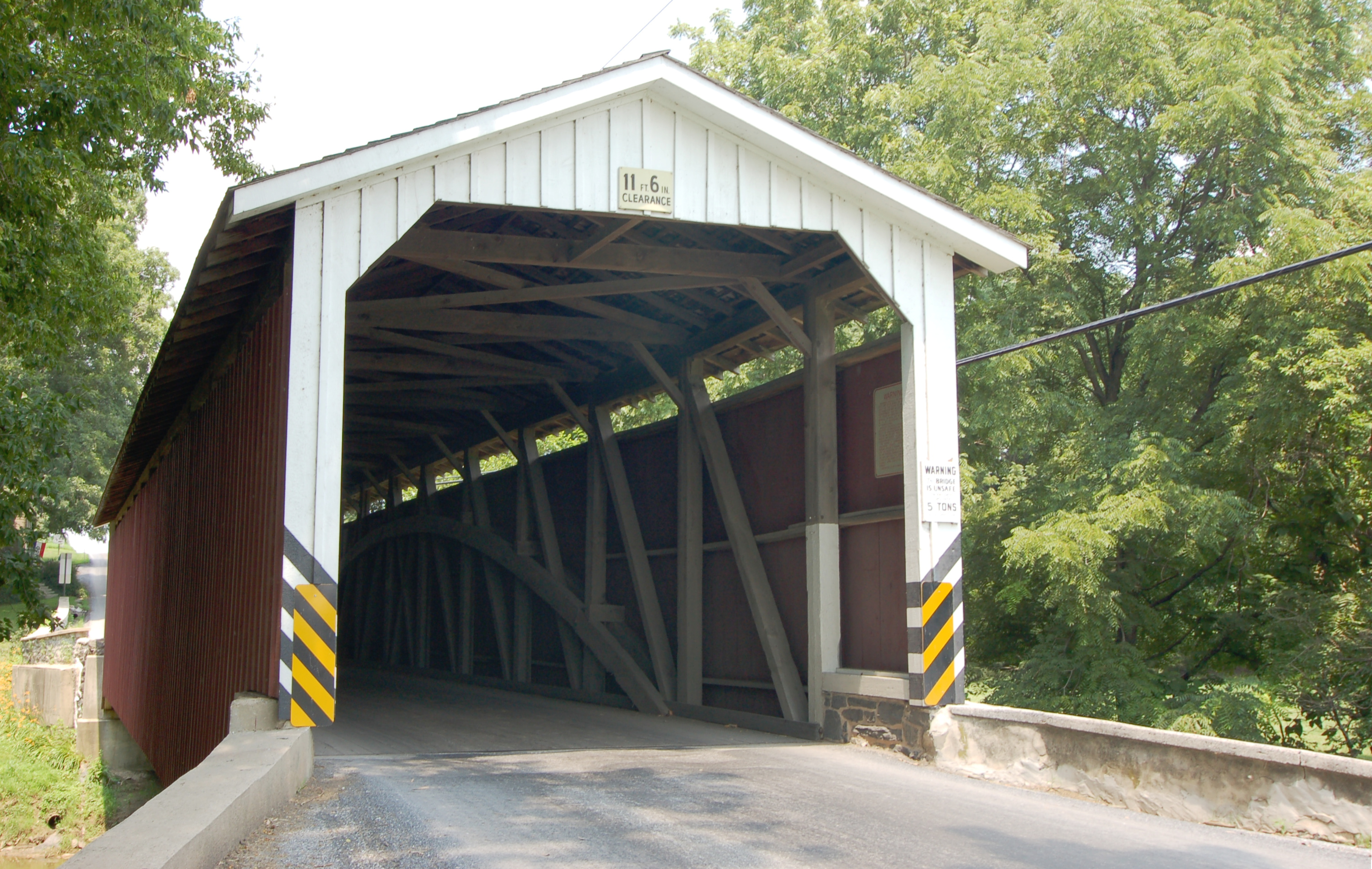
One of the approaches to the bridge

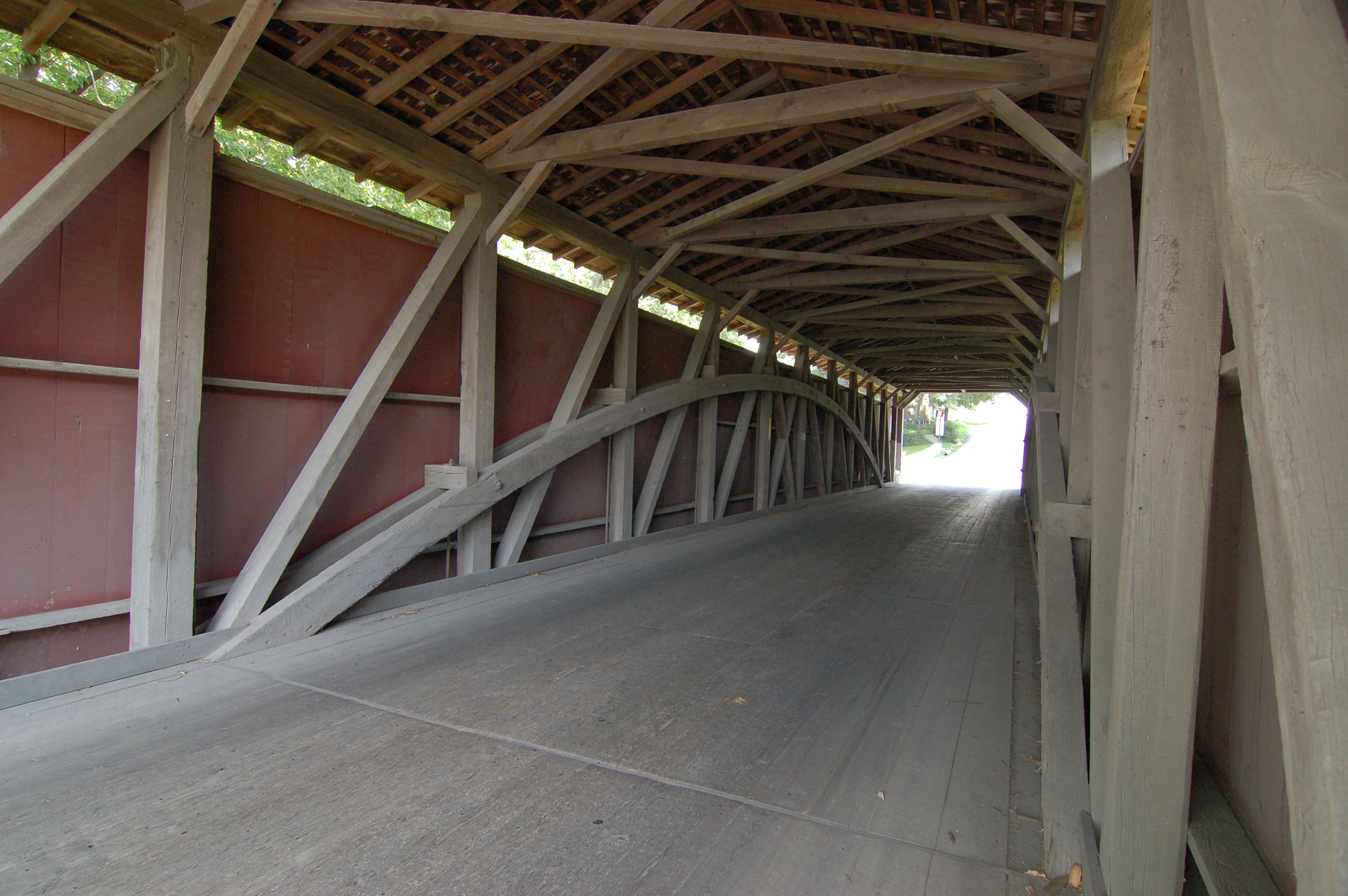
The inside of the bridge showing the Burr arch truss

== See also ==
- Burr arch truss
- List of Lancaster County covered bridges
