= James C. Carpenter =

American covered bridge builder

- Occupation: 19th century covered bridge builder
- Known for: Construction of 9 covered bridges in Lancaster County, Pennsylvania, 5 of which still survive

James C. Carpenter was an American covered bridge builder in Lancaster County, Pennsylvania. He is known to have built nine covered bridges, five of which still exist. Two of his bridges, Herr's Mill Covered Bridge and Colemanville Covered Bridge, are among the longest covered bridges remaining in the county. Only Elias McMellen is known to have built more covered bridges in the county, including a rebuild of Kauffman's Distillery Covered Bridge and Leaman's Place Covered Bridge, both originally built by James C. Carpenter.

- Leaman's Place Covered Bridge (built in 1845)
- Colemanville Covered Bridge (built in 1856)
- Kauffman's Distillery Covered Bridge (built in 1857)
- Herr's Mill Covered Bridge (rebuilt in 1875)
- Neff's Mill Covered Bridge (rebuilt in 1875)
- Siegrist's Mill Covered Bridge (built in 1885, destroyed in 2011)
