= Penryn, Pennsylvania =

Unincorporated community in Pennsylvania, US

- Census-designated place
- Location in Pennsylvania Location in the United States
- Coordinates: 40°12′18″N 76°22′06″W
- Country: United States
- State: Pennsylvania
- County: Lancaster
- Township: Penn

Area
  - Total: 1.90 sq mi (4.92 km^{2})
  - Land: 1.89 sq mi (4.89 km^{2})
  - Water: 0.012 sq mi (0.03 km^{2})
- Elevation: 585 ft (178 m)

Population (2020)
  - Total: 980
  - Density: 519.2/sq mi (200.48/km^{2})
- Time zone: UTC-5 (Eastern (EST))
  - Summer (DST): UTC-4 (EDT)
- ZIP code: 17564
- Area code: 717
- FIPS code: 42-59344
- GNIS feature ID: 1183564

Penryn is an unincorporated community and census-designated place (CDP) in Penn Township, Lancaster County, Pennsylvania, United States. As of the 2010 census the population was 1,024.

== Geography ==
Penryn is in northern Lancaster County, north of the center of Penn Township. It is 3.5 miles (5.6 km) northeast of Manheim, 6 miles (10 km) northwest of Lititz, and 13 miles (21 km) north of Lancaster, the county seat.

According to the U.S. Census Bureau, the Penryn CDP has a total area of 1.9 square miles (4.9 km^{2}), of which 0.01 square miles (0.03 km^{2}), or 0.67%, are water. Penryn is drained by tributaries of Chiques Creek, a south-flowing direct tributary of the Susquehanna River.

== Demographics ==
Historical population
Census	Pop.	Note	%±
2020	980		—
U.S. Decennial Census
