= Herr's Mill Covered Bridge =

Bridge in Lancaster County, Pennsylvania

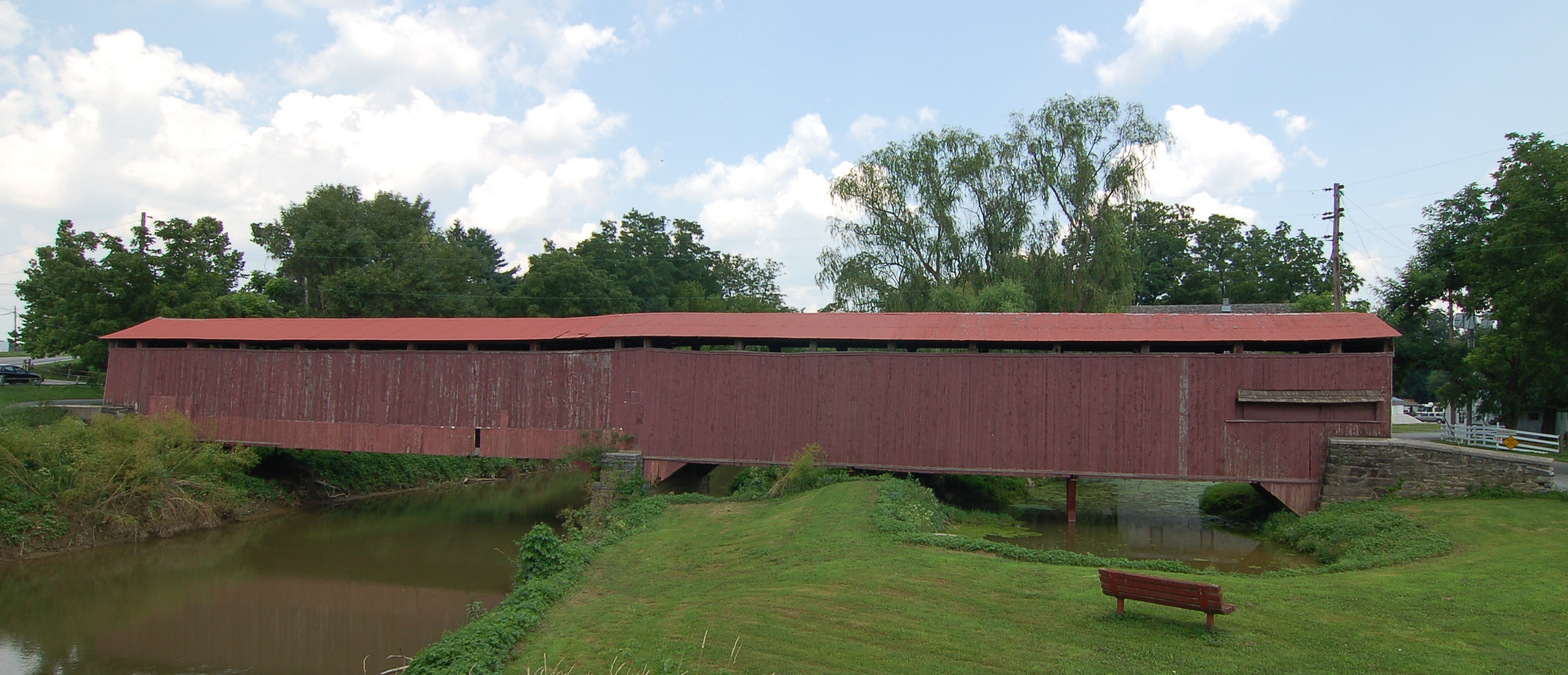
- Coordinates: 40.0098°N 76.1622°W
- Locale: Lancaster County, Pennsylvania, United States
- Other name: Soudersburg Bridge

Characteristics
- Design: double span, double Burr arch truss
- Total length: 178 feet (54.3 m)

History
- Constructed by: Joseph Elliot and Robert Russell
- Construction start: 1844
- Herr's Mill Covered Bridge
- U.S. National Register of Historic Places
- MPS: Covered Bridges of Lancaster County TR
- NRHP reference No.: 80003537
- Added to NRHP: December 10, 1980

Location
- Interactive map of Herr's Mill Covered Bridge

The Herr's Mill Covered Bridge was a covered bridge that spans Pequea Creek in Lancaster County, Pennsylvania, United States. It is also sometimes known as Soudersburg Bridge.

The bridge had a double span, wooden, double Burr arch trusses design. It was painted red on the outside, the traditional color of Lancaster County covered bridges. Both approaches to the bridge were painted in the traditional white color.

The bridge's WGCB Number is 38-36-21. In 1980 it was added to the National Register of Historic Places as structure number 80003537. It was located at 40°0′35.4″N 76°9′43.8″W (40.00983, -76.16217), in Paradise Township on Ronks Road 0.4 km (0.25 mi) south of U.S. Route 30 to the east of Lancaster city.

== History ==
Herr's Mill Covered Bridge was built in 1844 by Joseph Elliot and Robert Russell at a cost of $1787. It has a double-span, double-arch Burr arch truss construction. In 1875, the bridge was rebuilt by James C. Carpenter at a cost of $1860. The bridge was later bypassed by a new concrete bridge and is now on the private property of the Mill Bridge Village Camping Resort. Owner Brian Kopan was quoted as saying "The bridge is in fine condition. We’re hoping to keep it as it is." In October 2018, the bridge was dismantled and was being moved to Elizabethtown, before it fell into the creek.

== Dimensions ==
- Length: 178 feet (54.3 m) total length
- Width: 15 feet (4.6 m) total width

== Gallery ==
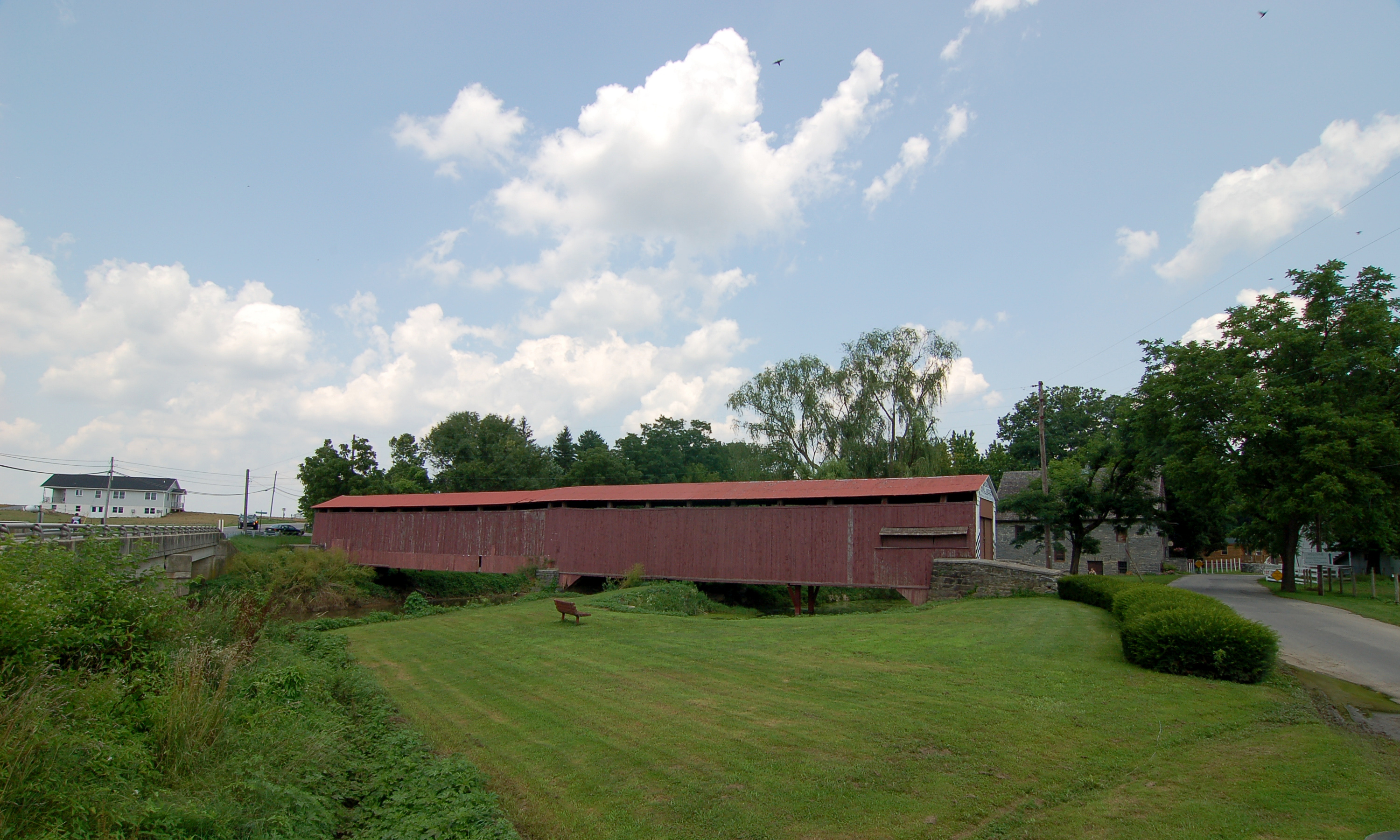
The side of the bridge showing part of the main road to the left and Herr's Mill to the right

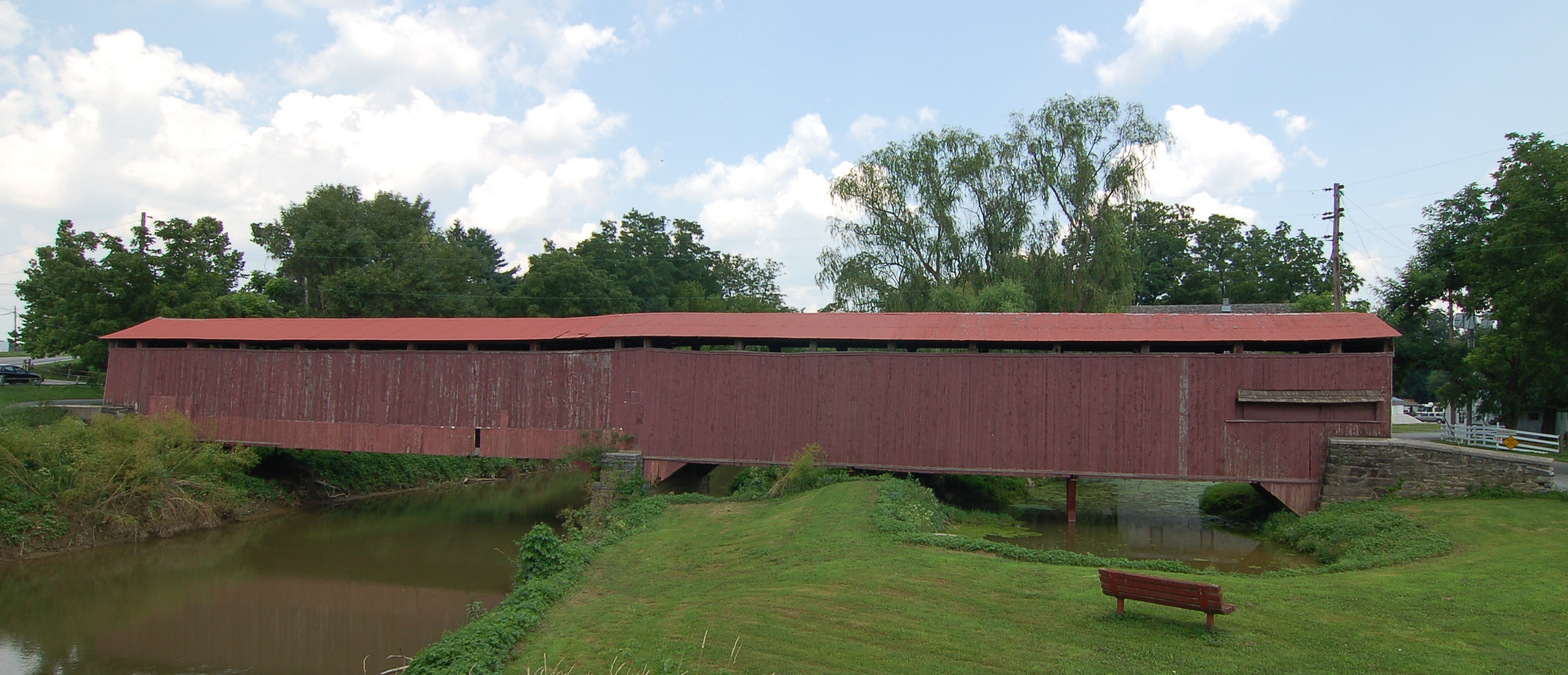
Another picture of the same side

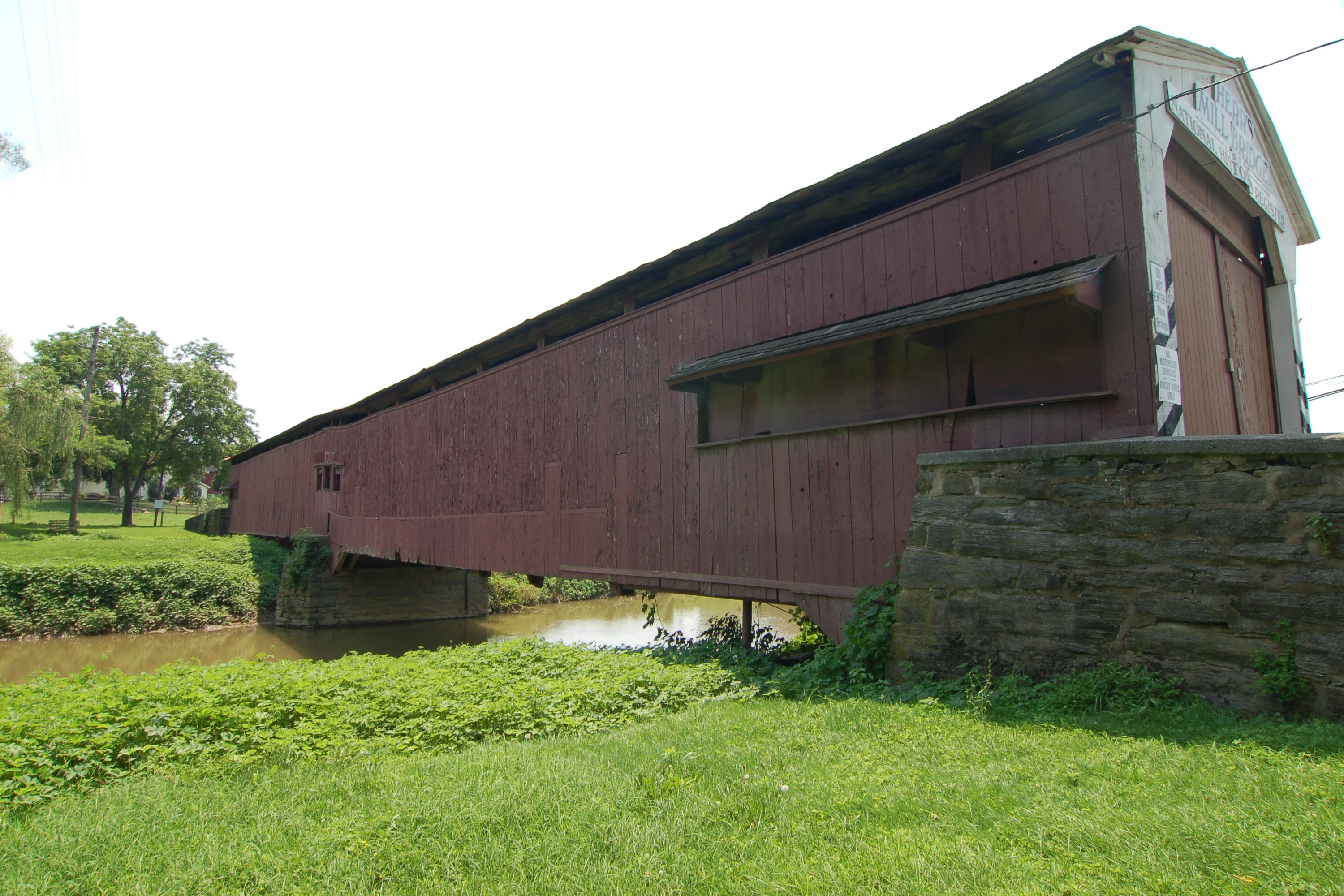
The other side of the bridge

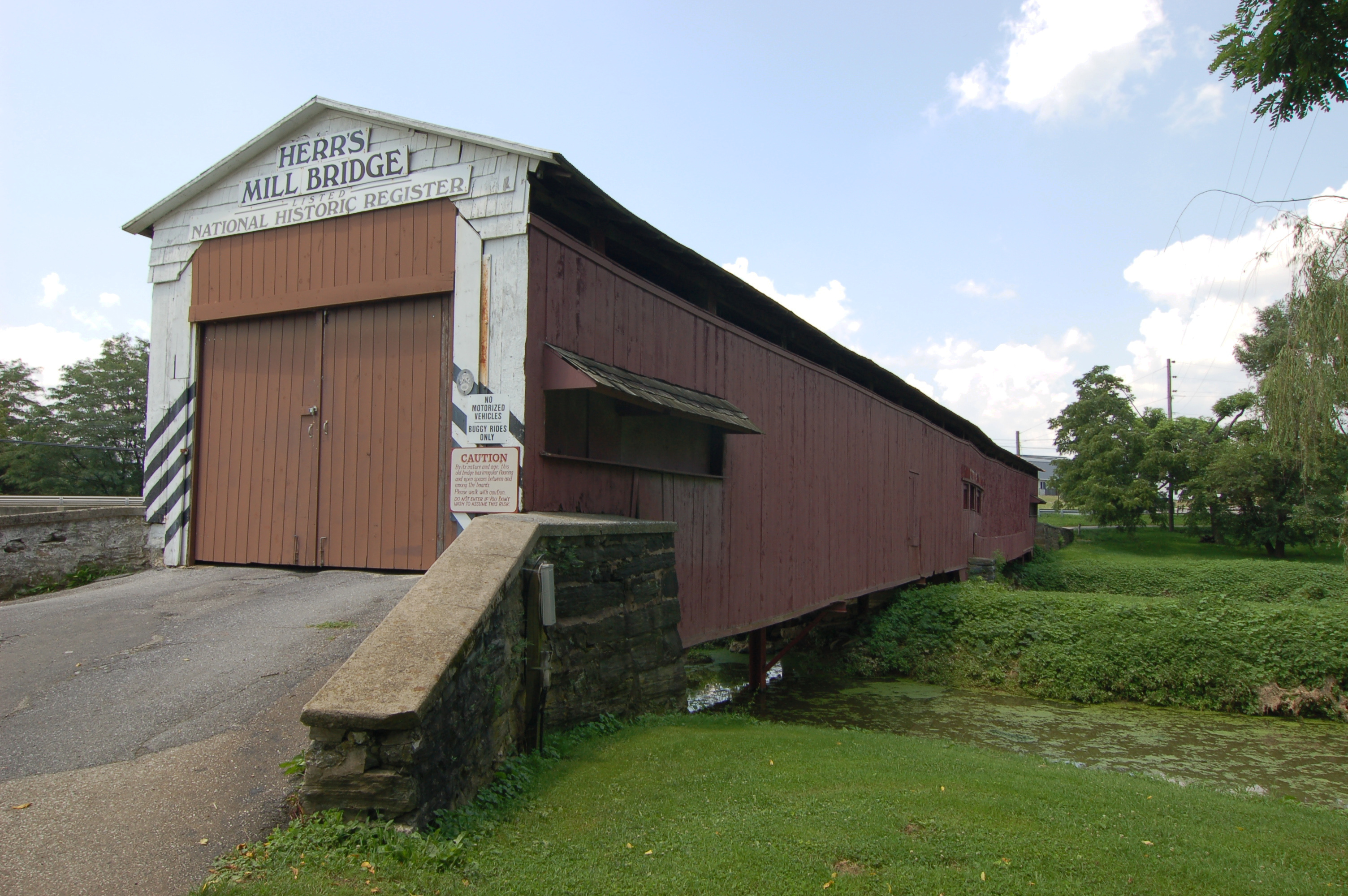

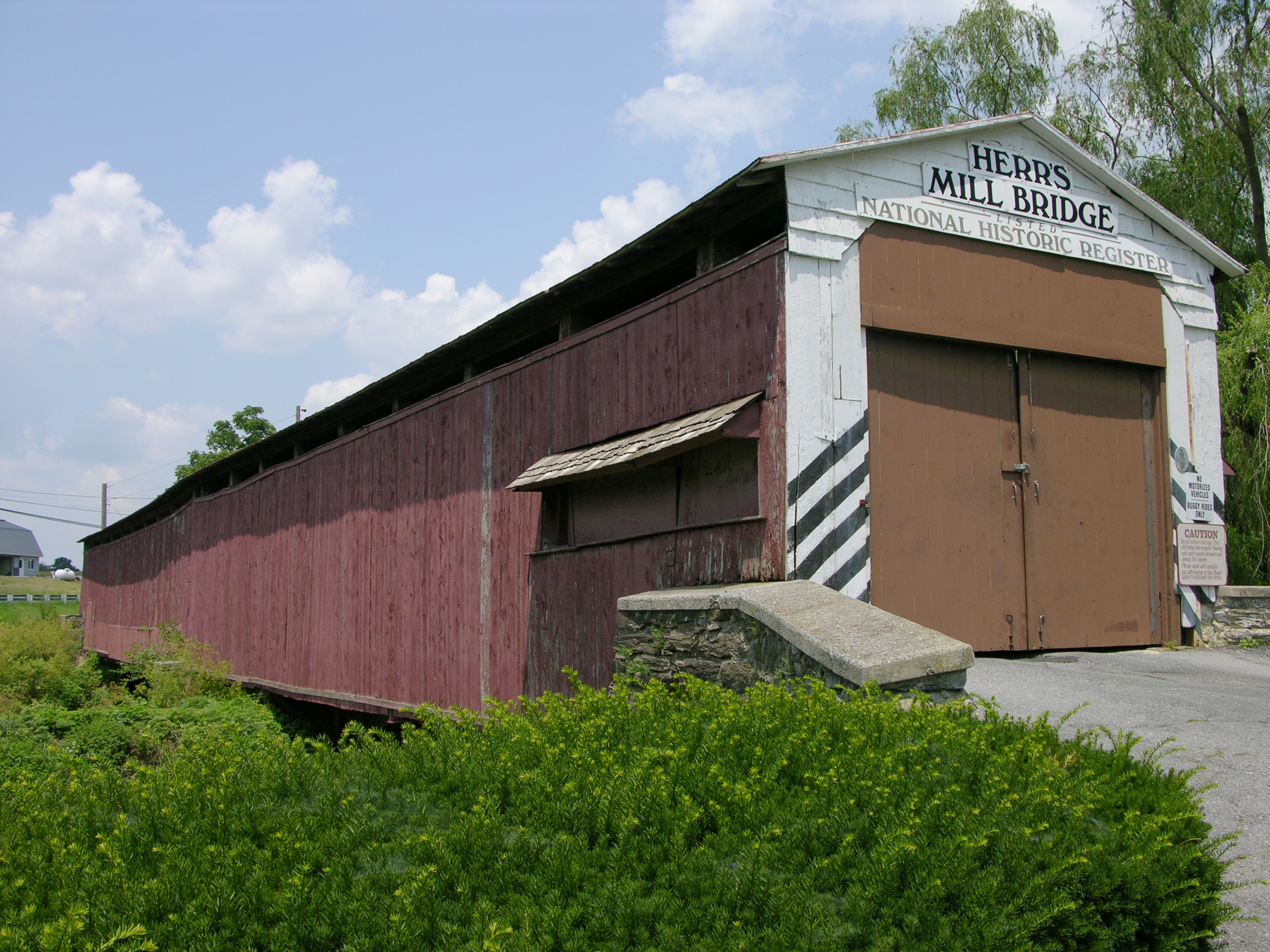

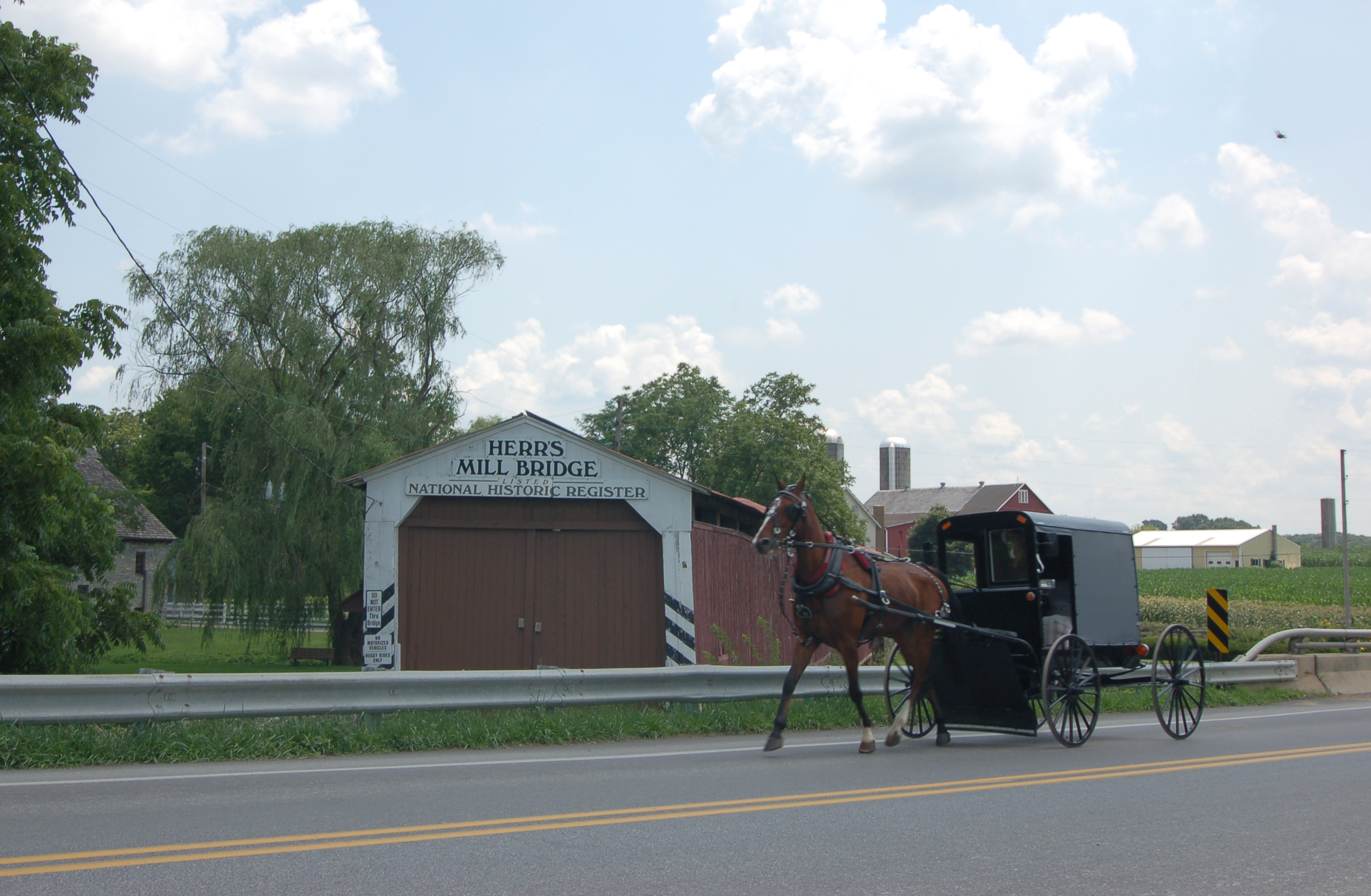
A horse and buggy going past the bridge

== See also ==
- Burr arch truss
- List of Lancaster County covered bridges
