= Penn Township, Lancaster County, Pennsylvania =

Township in Pennsylvania, US

Coordinates: 40°12′00″N 76°22′35″W

- Township
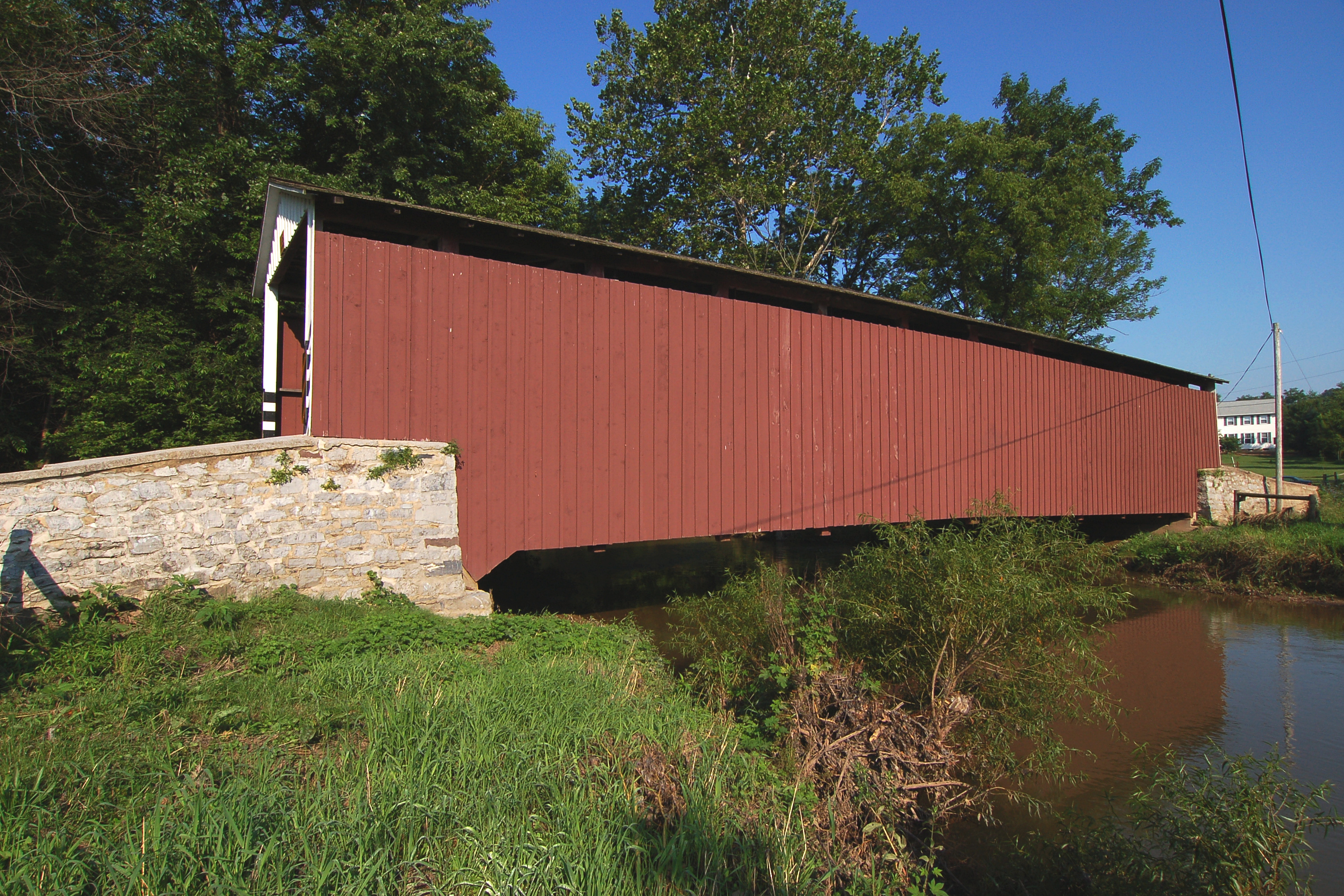
- Kauffman's Distillery Covered Bridge

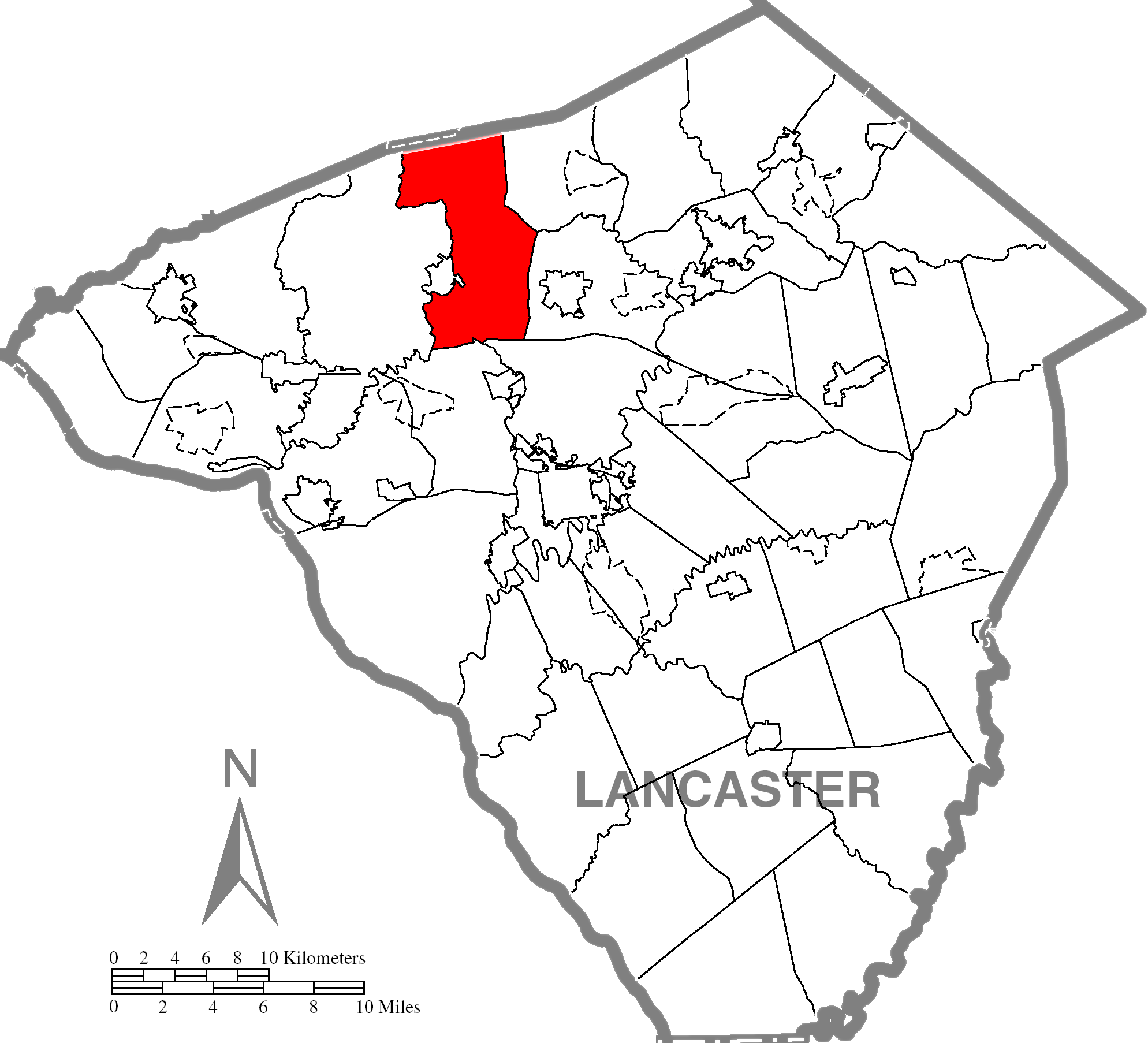
- Map of Lancaster County highlighting Penn Township
- Country: United States
- State: Pennsylvania
- County: Lancaster
- Settled: 1735
- Incorporated: 1846

Government
  - Type: Board of Supervisors

Area
  - Total: 29.71 sq mi (76.95 km^{2})
  - Land: 29.58 sq mi (76.62 km^{2})
  - Water: 0.13 sq mi (0.33 km^{2})

Population (2020)
  - Total: 10,224 ▲
  - Estimate (2021): 10,233
  - Density: 320.2/sq mi (123.62/km^{2})
- Time zone: UTC-5 (Eastern (EST))
  - Summer (DST): UTC-4 (EDT)
- Area code: 717
- FIPS code: 42-071-58840
- Website: penntwplanco.org

Penn Township is a township that is located in north central Lancaster County, Pennsylvania, United States. The population was 10,224 at the time of the 2020 census.

== History ==
The Kauffman's Distillery Covered Bridge and Mount Hope Estate are listed on the National Register of Historic Places.

== Geography ==
According to the United States Census Bureau, the township has a total area of 29.7 square miles (76.8 km^{2}), of which 29.6 square miles (76.7 km^{2}) are land and 0.04 square miles (0.1 km^{2}), or 0.07%, are water. It is bordered to the west by the borough of Manheim.

Unincorporated communities in the township include Mount Hope, Elstonville, White Oak, Penryn, Elwyn Terrace, Valley View, Fairland, Lancaster Junction, and part of Elm and Halfville.

== Demographics ==
Historical population
| Census | Pop. | Note | %± |
|---|---|---|---|
| 2000 | 7,312 | | — |
| 2010 | 8,789 | | 20.2% |
| 2020 | 10,224 | | 16.3% |
| 2021 (est.) | 10,233 | | 0.1% |
U.S. Decennial Census

As of the census of 2000, there were 7,312 people, 2,606 households, and 2,024 families living in the township.

The population density was 95.3 people/km^{2} (247 people/mi^{2}). There were 2,671 housing units at an average density of 34.8 units/km^{2} (90 units/mi^{2}).

The racial makeup of the township was 97.54% White, 0.83% African American, 0.15% Native American, 0.72% Asian, 0.05% Pacific Islander, 0.23% from other races, and 0.46% from two or more races. Hispanic or Latino of any race were 0.86% of the population.

There were 2,606 households, out of which 33.8% had children under the age of eighteen living with them; 69.4% were married couples living together, 5.5% had a female householder with no husband present, and 22.3% were non-families. 18.5% of all households were made up of individuals, and 8.3% had someone living alone who was sixty-five years of age or older.

The average household size was 2.74 and the average family size was 3.14.

Within the township, the population was spread out, with 26.1% of residents who were under the age of eighteen, 7.7% who were aged eighteen to twenty-four, 27.0% who were aged twenty-five to forty-four, 24.7% who were aged forty-five to sixty-four, and 14.6% who were sixty-five years of age or older. The median age was thirty-eight years.

For every one hundred females, there were 97.4 males. For every one hundred females who were aged eighteen or older, there were 95.3 males.

The median income for a household in the township was $47,205, and the median income for a family was $49,620. Males had a median income of $37,075 compared with that of $23,795 for females.

The per capita income for the township was $18,719.

Approximately 2.2% of families and 4.4% of the population were living below the poverty line, including 5.8% of those who were under the age of eighteen and 1.9% of those who were aged sixty-five or older.
