= Paradise Township, Lancaster County, Pennsylvania =

Township in Pennsylvania, US

Coordinates: 39°59′00″N 76°06′59″W

- Township
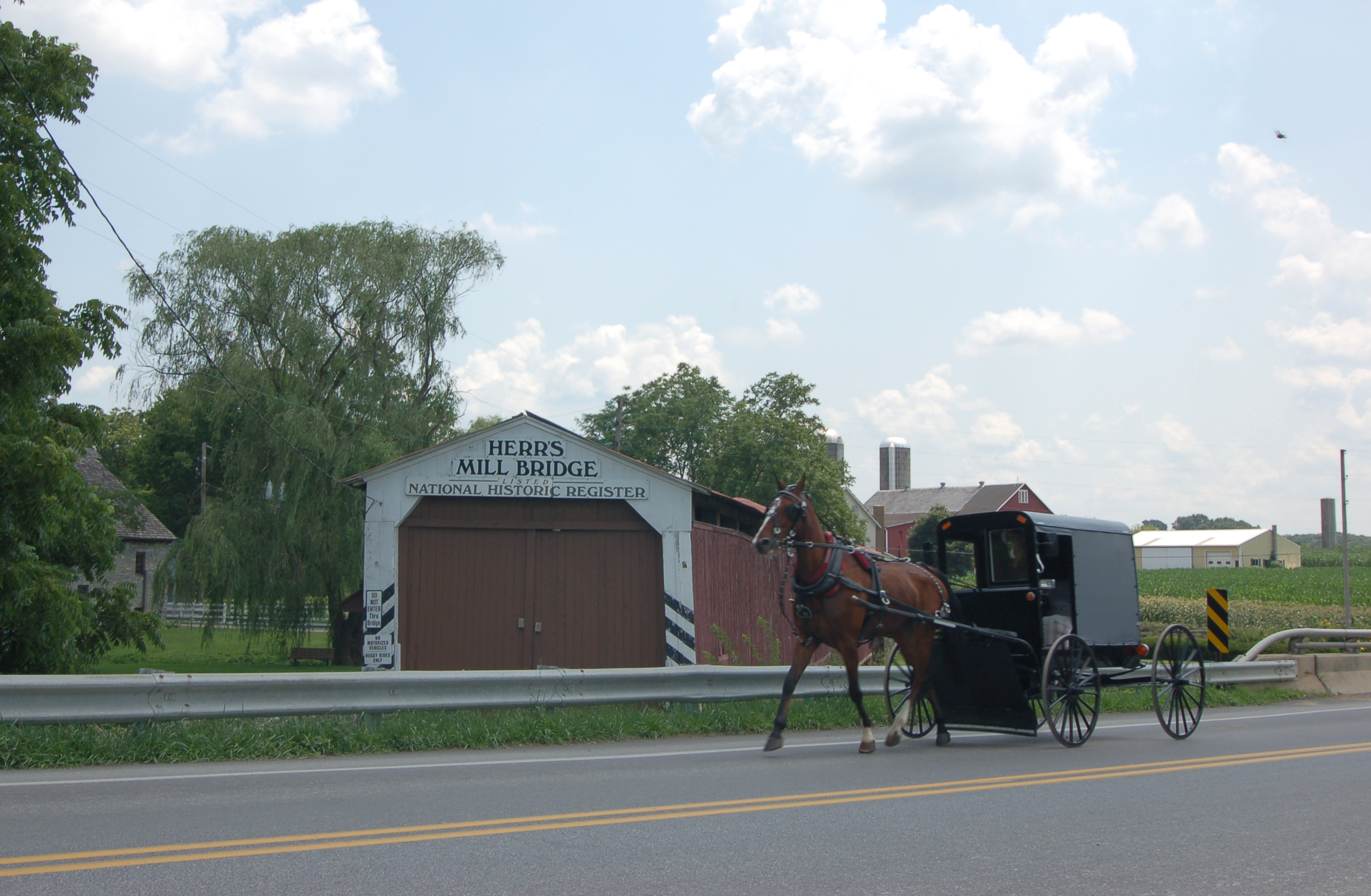
- Herr's Mill Covered Bridge and an Amish buggy in Paradise Township

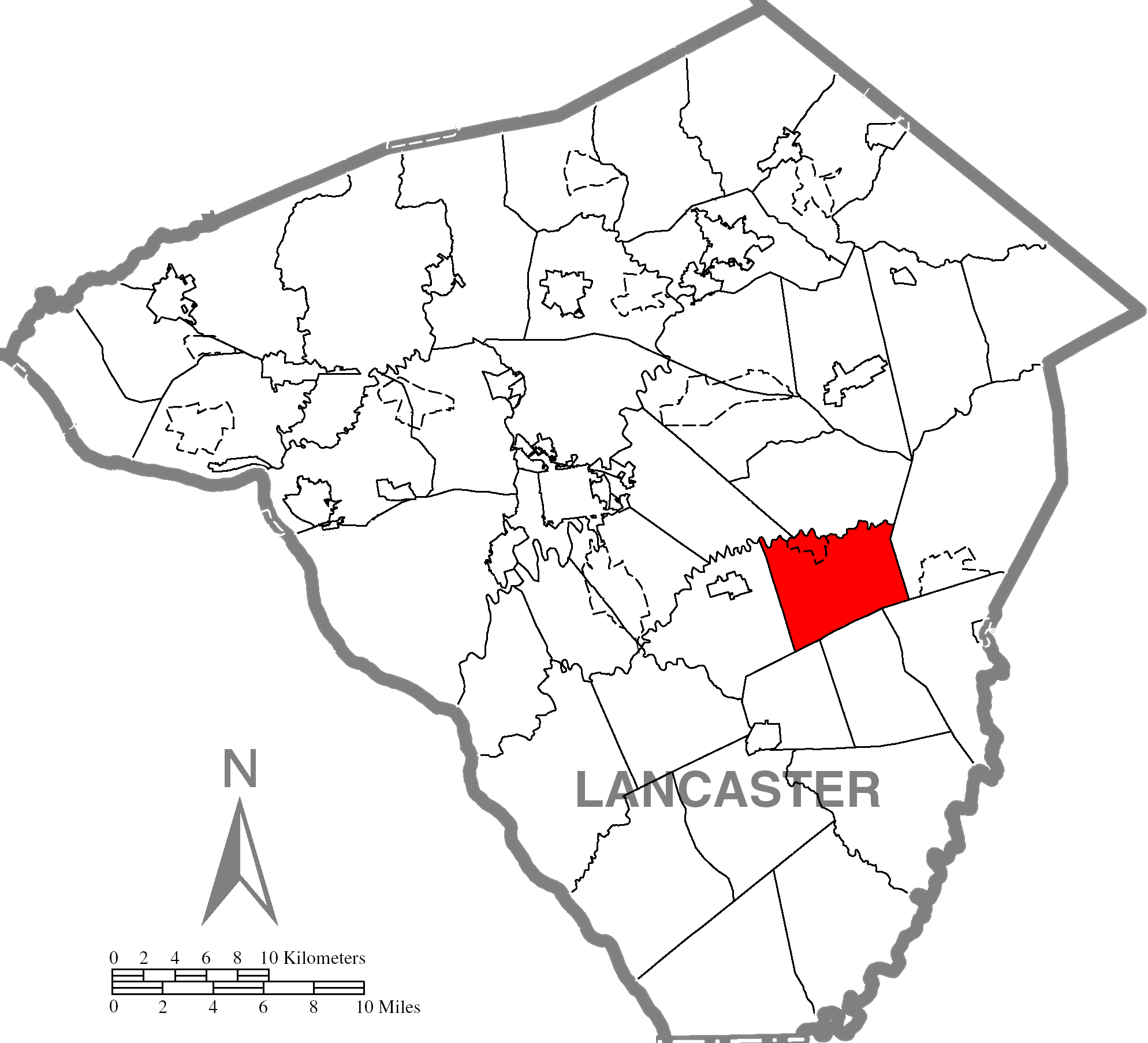
- Map of Lancaster County highlighting Paradise Township
- Country: United States
- State: Pennsylvania
- County: Lancaster
- Settled: 1710
- Incorporated: 1843

Government
  - Type: Board of Supervisors

Area
  - Total: 18.71 sq mi (48.45 km^{2})
  - Land: 18.60 sq mi (48.17 km^{2})
  - Water: 0.11 sq mi (0.28 km^{2})

Population (2020)
  - Total: 5,672
  - Estimate (2025): 5,799 ▲
  - Density: 312/sq mi (120/km^{2})
- Time zone: UTC-5 (Eastern (EST))
  - Summer (DST): UTC-4 (EDT)
- Area code: 717
- FIPS code: 42-071-57848
- Website: paradisetownship.org

Paradise Township is a township that is located in east-central Lancaster County, Pennsylvania, United States. The population was 5,696 at the time of the 2020 census.

== Geography ==
According to the United States Census Bureau, the township has a total area of 18.7 square miles (48.4 km^{2}), of which 18.6 square miles (48.2 km^{2}) are land and 0.04 square miles (0.1 km^{2}), or 0.27%, are water.

Unincorporated communities in the township include Paradise, Leahman Place, Harristown, Vintage, Kinzers, Bellemont, and Iva.

== Demographics ==
Historical population
Census	Pop.	Note	%±
2000	4,698		—
2010	5,131		9.2%
2020	5,672		10.5%
2025 (est.)	5,799		2.2%
U.S. Decennial Census

At the time of the 2000 census, there were 4,698 people, 1,554 households, and 1,226 families living in the township.

The population density was 252.4 inhabitants per square mile (97.5/km^{2}). There were 1,600 housing units at an average density of 85.9 per square mile (33.2/km^{2}).

The racial makeup of the township was 98.36% White, 0.62% African American, 0.11% Native American, 0.11% Asian, 0.06% Pacific Islander, 0.17% from other races, and 0.57% from two or more races. Hispanic or Latino of any race were 0.72%.

There were 1,554 households, 35.5% had children under the age of eighteen living with them; 68.9% were married couples living together, 6.9% had a female householder with no husband present, and 21.1% were non-families. 17.7% of households were made up of individuals, and 6.4% were one-person households with residents who were aged sixty-five or older.

The average household size was 2.99 and the average family size was 3.42.

The age distribution was 30.2% of residents who were under the age of eighteen, 9.2% who were aged eighteen to twenty-four, 25.8% who were aged twenty-five to forty-four, 21.7% who were aged forty-five to sixty-four, and 13.0% who were sixty-five or older. The median age was thirty-four years.

For every one hundred females, there were 103.0 males. For every one hundred females who were aged eighteen or older, there were 100.1 males.

The median household income was $42,047 and the median family income was $44,575. Males had a median income of $32,366 compared with that of $21,755 for females.

The per capita income for the township was $16,631.

Approximately 5.8% of families and 8.4% of the population were living below the poverty line, including 11.4% of those who were under the age of eighteen and 9.5% of those who were aged sixty-five or older.
