= Neff's Mill Covered Bridge =

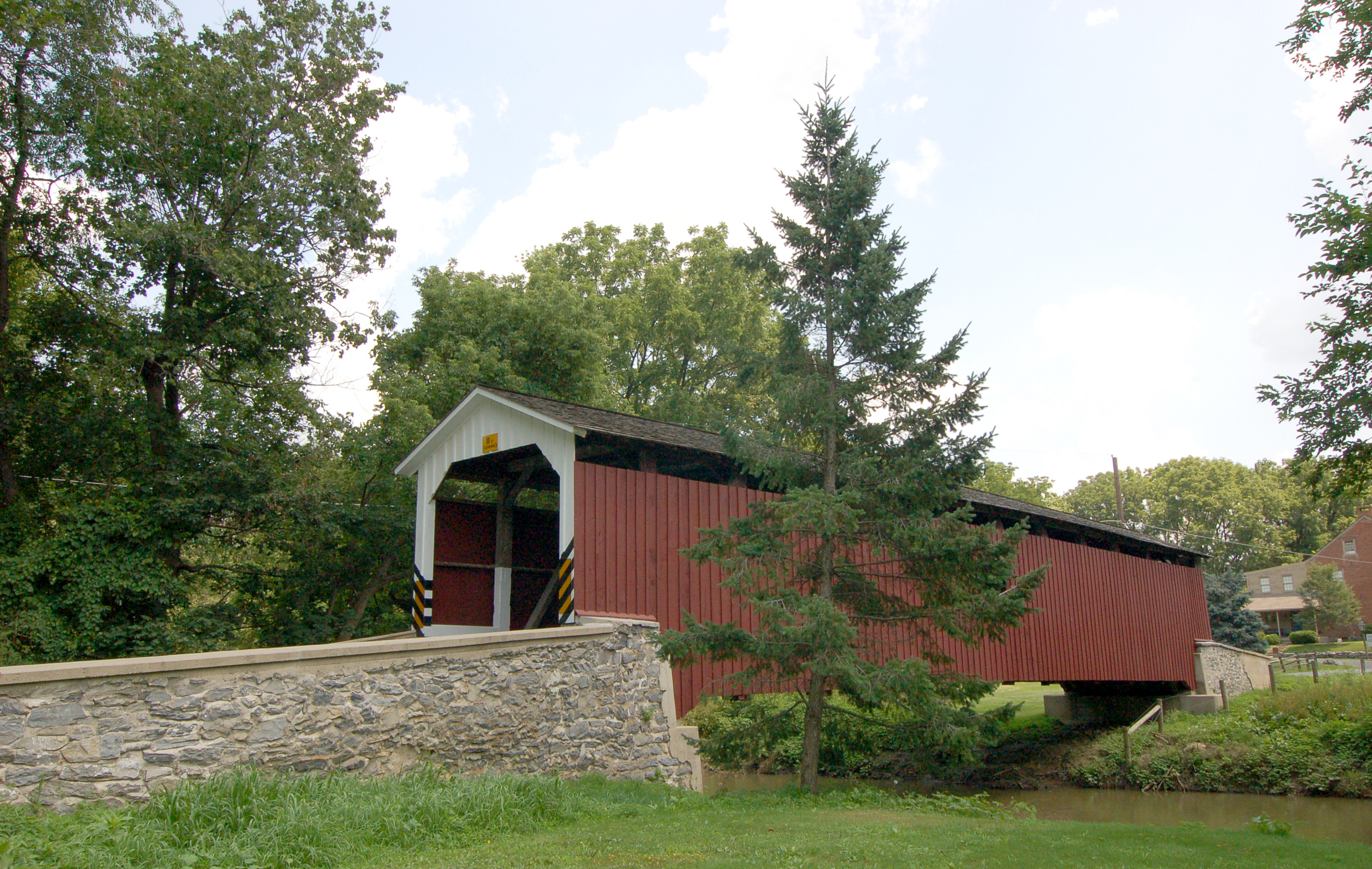
- Coordinates: 39.9788°N 76.2258°W
- Locale: Lancaster County, Pennsylvania, United States
- Official name: Pequea #7 Bridge

Characteristics
- Design: single span, double Burr arch truss
- Total length: 102 feet (31.1 m)

History
- Constructed by: Built by Christian Brackbill; Rebuilt by James C. Carpenter
- Construction start: 1824, rebuilt in 1875
- Neff's Mill Covered Bridge
- U.S. National Register of Historic Places
- MPS: Covered Bridges of Lancaster County TR
- NRHP reference No.: 80003538
- Added to NRHP: December 11, 1980

Location
- Interactive map of Neff's Mill Covered Bridge

The Neff's Mill Covered Bridge or Bowman's Mill Covered Bridge is a covered bridge that spans the Pequea Creek on the border between West Lampeter Township and Strasburg Township in Lancaster County, Pennsylvania, United States. A county-owned and maintained bridge, its official designation is the Pequea #7 Bridge.

The bridge has a single span, wooden, double Burr arch trusses design with the addition of steel hanger rods. The deck is made from oak planks. It is painted red, the traditional color of Lancaster County covered bridges, on both the inside and outside. Both approaches to the bridge are painted in the traditional white color. It is purportedly the narrowest covered bridge in the county.

The bridge's WGCB Number is 38-36-22. Added in 1980, it is listed on the National Register of Historic Places as structure number 80003538. It is located at 39°58′43.8″N 76°13′33″W (39.97883, -76.22583), on Penn Grant Road 1.25 miles to the east of U.S. Route 222 and to the south of Lampeter, Pennsylvania and Pennsylvania Route 741.

== History ==
The covered bridge was originally built by Christian Brackbill in 1824 for an unknown cost. It was known as Bowman's Mill Covered Bridge. It was rebuilt in 1875 by James C. Carpenter at a cost of $1,860. Note: This is the narrowest covered bridge in the county.

On May 28, 2025 a box truck rammed through the bridge and caused extensive damage. According to local news station WGAL, the bridge was closed indefinitely pending further inspection.

== Dimensions ==
- Length: 90 feet (27.4 m) span and 102 feet (31 m) total length^{Note:}
- Width: 11 feet 7 inches (3.53 m) clear deck and 15 feet (4.6 m) total width^{Note:}
- Overhead clearance: 11 feet (3.4 m)^{Note:}
- Under clearance: 13 feet 6 inches (4.11 m)

== Gallery ==
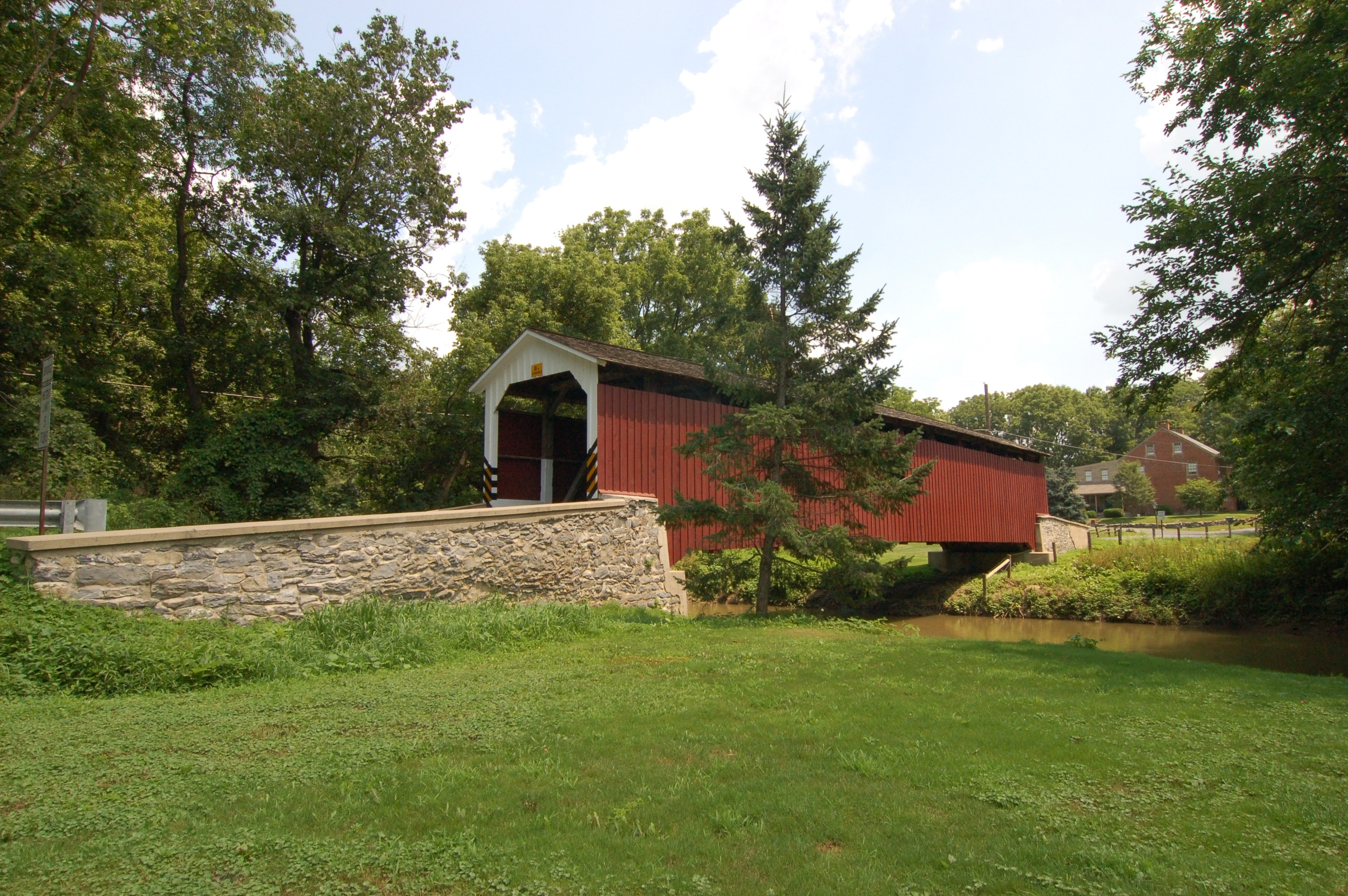
A wide view of the side of the bridge

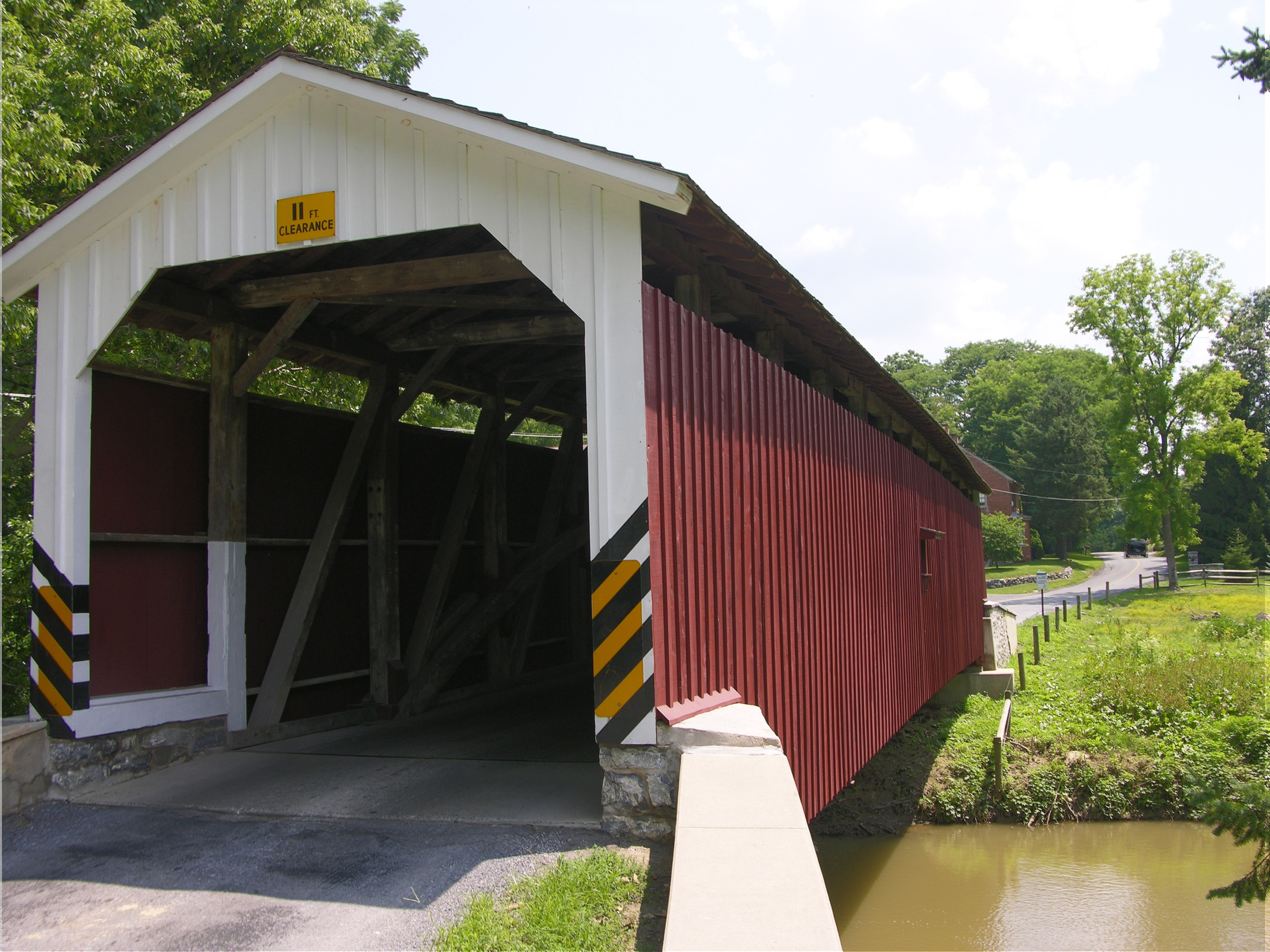
A three-quarters view of the bridge

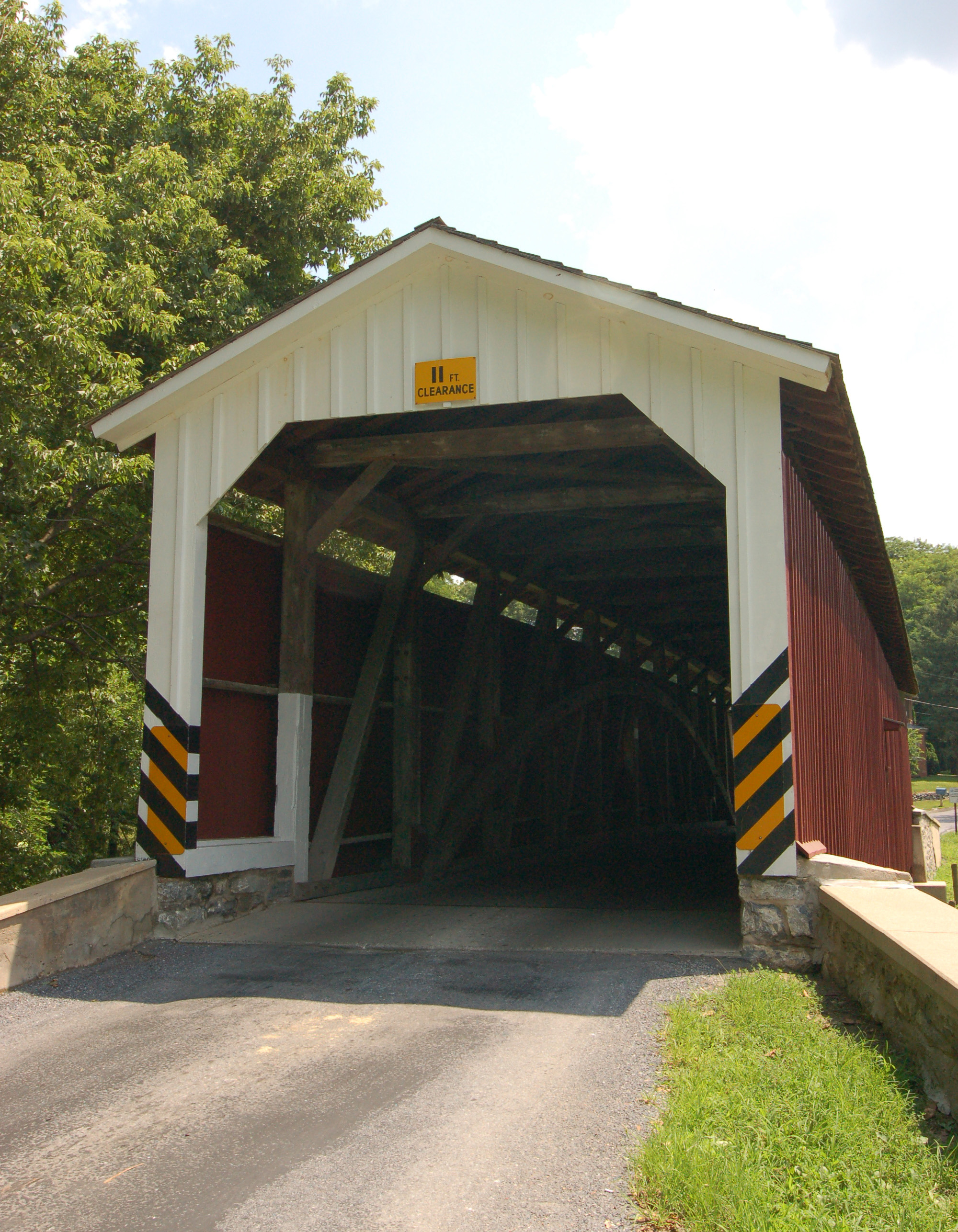
One of the bridge's portals

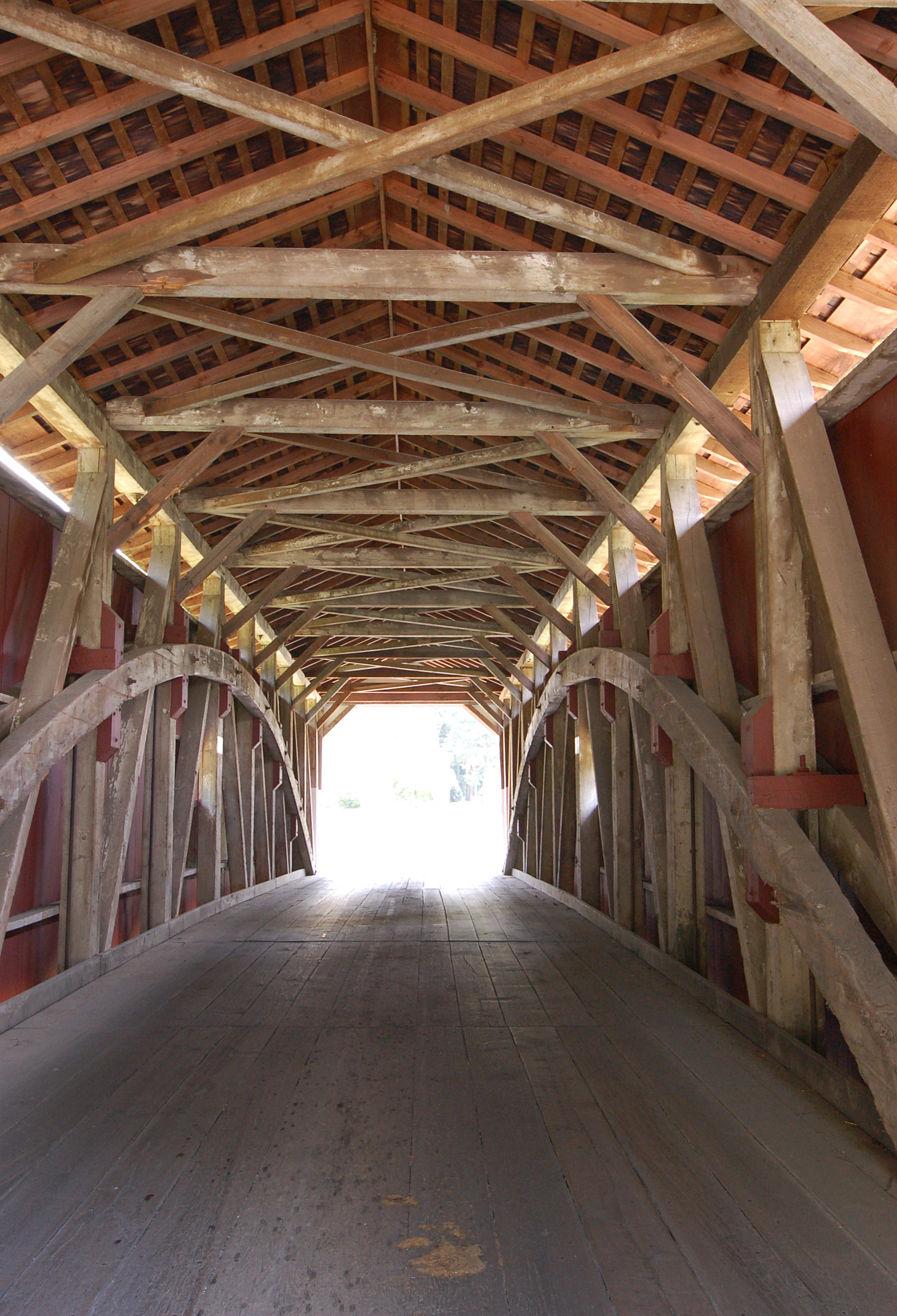
The inside of the bridge

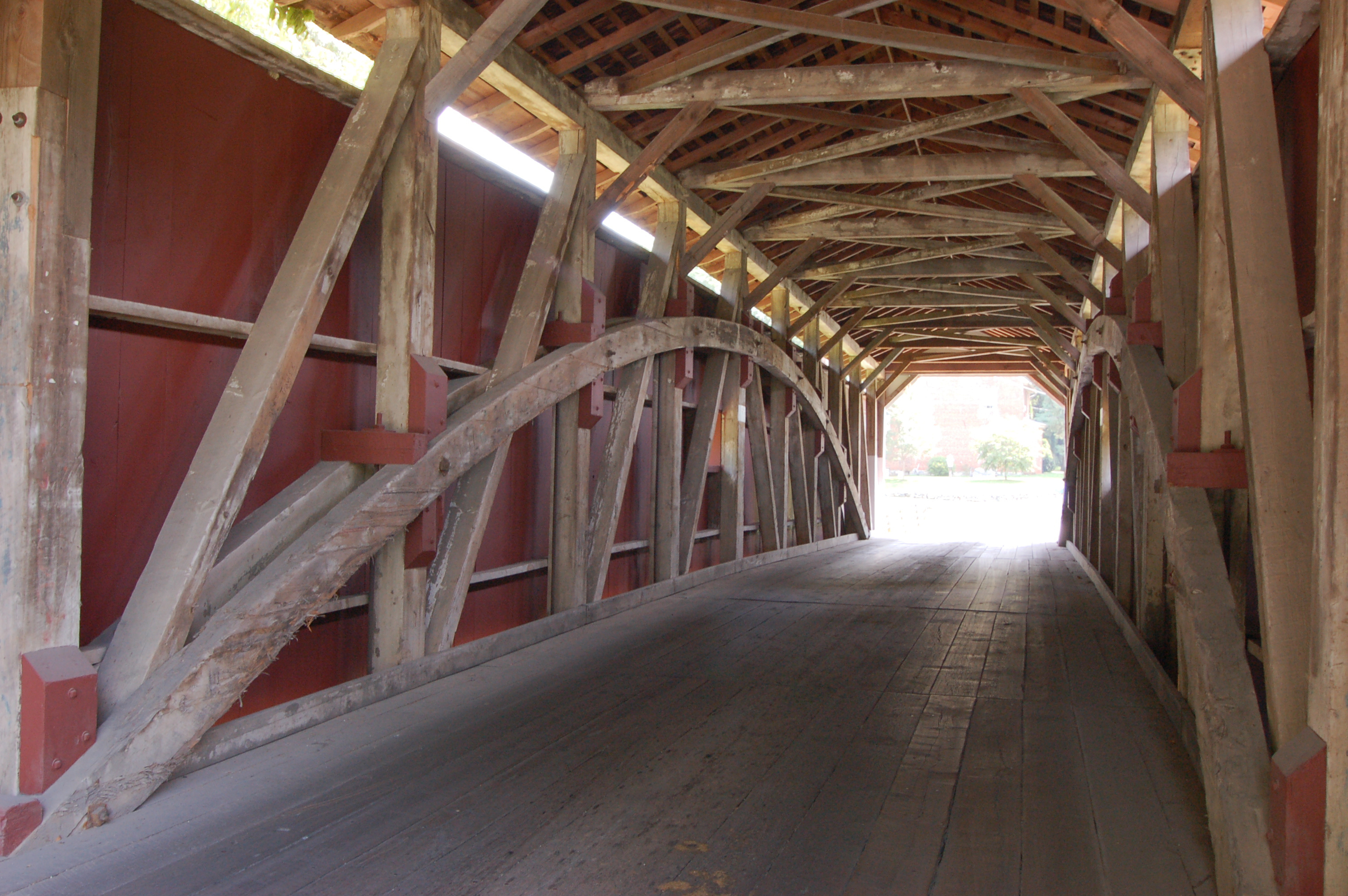
Closeup of the Burr arch truss design

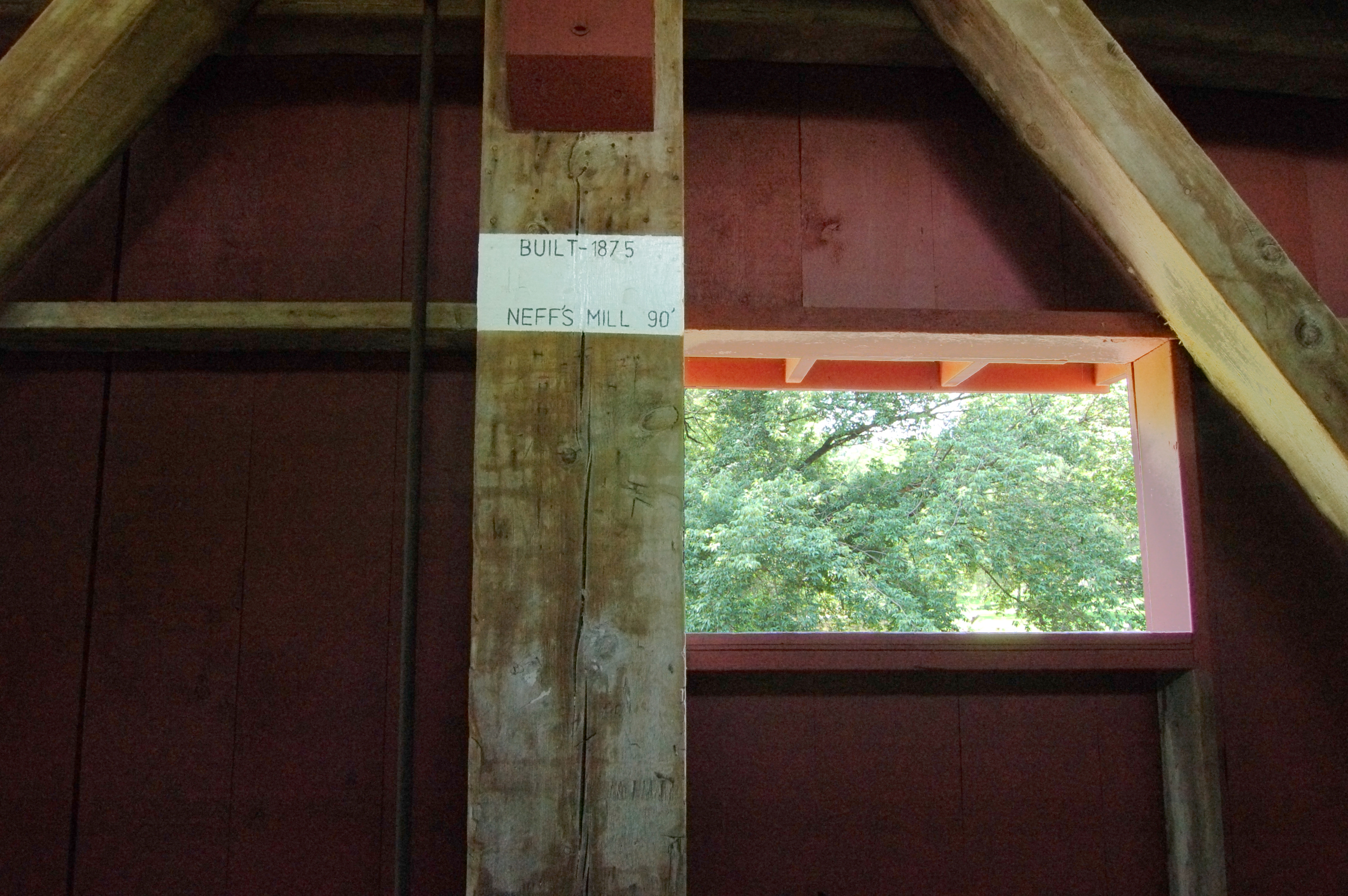
The window and painted sign inside the bridge

== See also ==
- Burr arch truss
- List of Lancaster County covered bridges
