= Colemanville Covered Bridge =

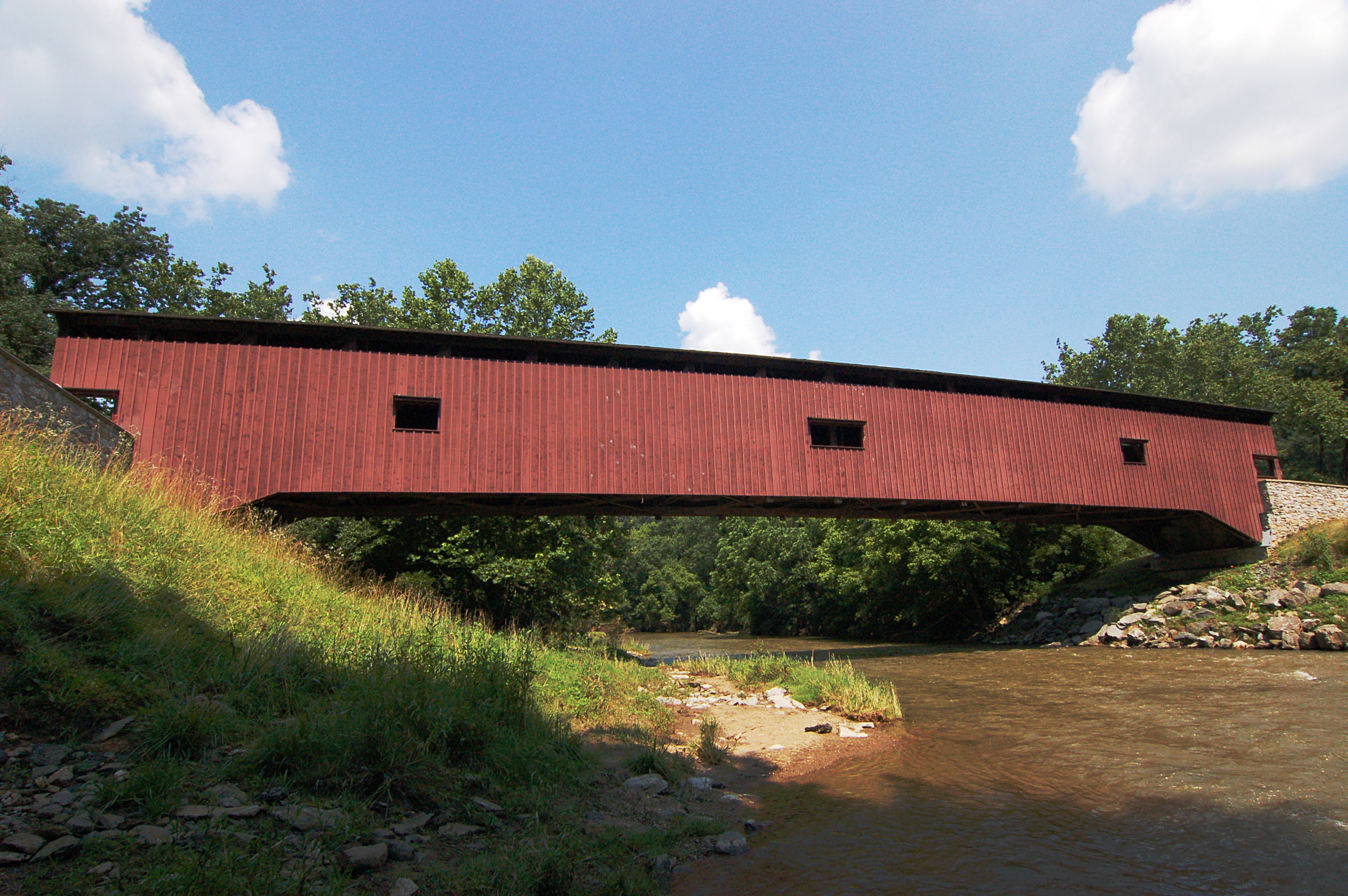
- Wide view of the side of the bridge
- Coordinates: 39°53′56″N 76°20′32″W
- Carries: T412 / T398
- Crosses: Pequea Creek
- Locale: Lancaster, Pennsylvania, United States
- Official name: Pequea #12 Bridge
- Other name: Martic Forge
- Maintained by: Lancaster County
- NBI Number: 367224040815120

Characteristics
- Total length: 170 ft (52 m)
- Width: 15 ft (4.6 m)
- Height: 11.5 ft (3.5 m)
- Load limit: 11 t (12 short tons)

History
- Constructed by: James C. Carpenter
- Built: 1856
- Colemanville Covered Bridge
- U.S. National Register of Historic Places
- MPS: Covered Bridges of Lancaster County TR
- NRHP reference No.: 80003534
- Added to NRHP: December 11, 1980

Location
- Interactive map of Colemanville Covered Bridge

The Colemanville Covered Bridge is a covered bridge that spans Pequea Creek in Lancaster County, Pennsylvania, United States. After Hunsecker's Mill Covered Bridge, it is Lancaster County's second-longest single-span covered bridge still being used. It is also referred to as the Martic Forge Covered Bridge and Pequea #12 Bridge.

The bridge has a single span, wooden, double Burr arch trusses design with the addition of steel hanger rods. The deck is made from oak planks. It is painted red, the traditional color of Lancaster County covered bridges, on both the inside and outside. Both approaches to the bridge are painted red with white trim.

The bridge's WGCB Number is 38-36-26. In 1980 it was added to the National Register of Historic Places as structure number 80003534. The bridge is located on Fox Hollow Road just south of Pennsylvania route 324 in Martic Township, Pennsylvania.

== History ==
The Colemanville Covered Bridge was originally built in 1856 by James C. Carpenter at a cost of $2,244. After being damaged twice by flooding, it was partially rebuilt in 1938 by Edmund Gardner and 1973 by David Esh. Lancaster county completely rebuilt the bridge in 1992 for $350,000. During the restoration process the bridge was raised by 6 feet (1.8 m) and moved west a few feet to protect it from damage in potential future flooding.

== Gallery ==
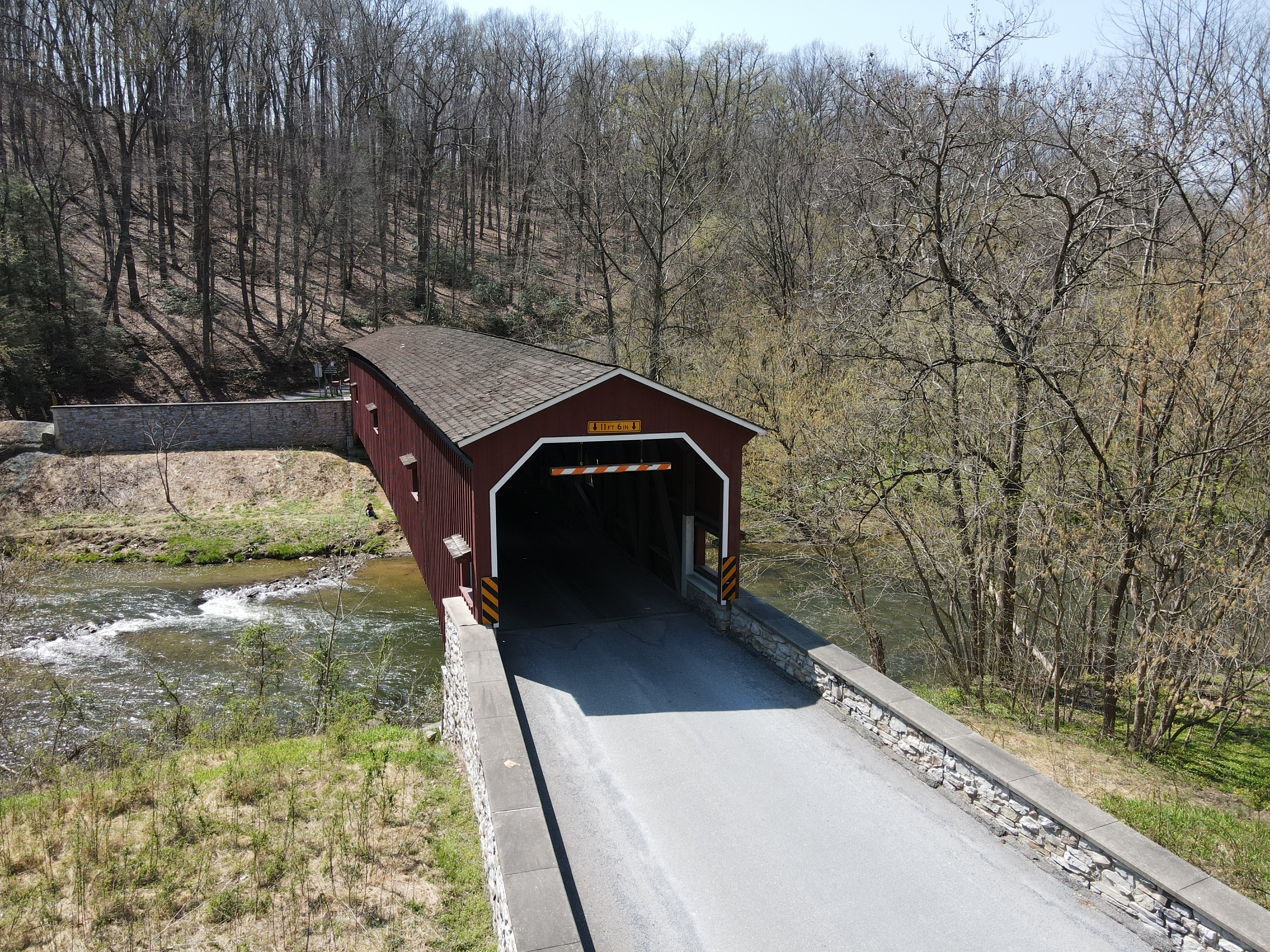
A view of the bridge from the air #1

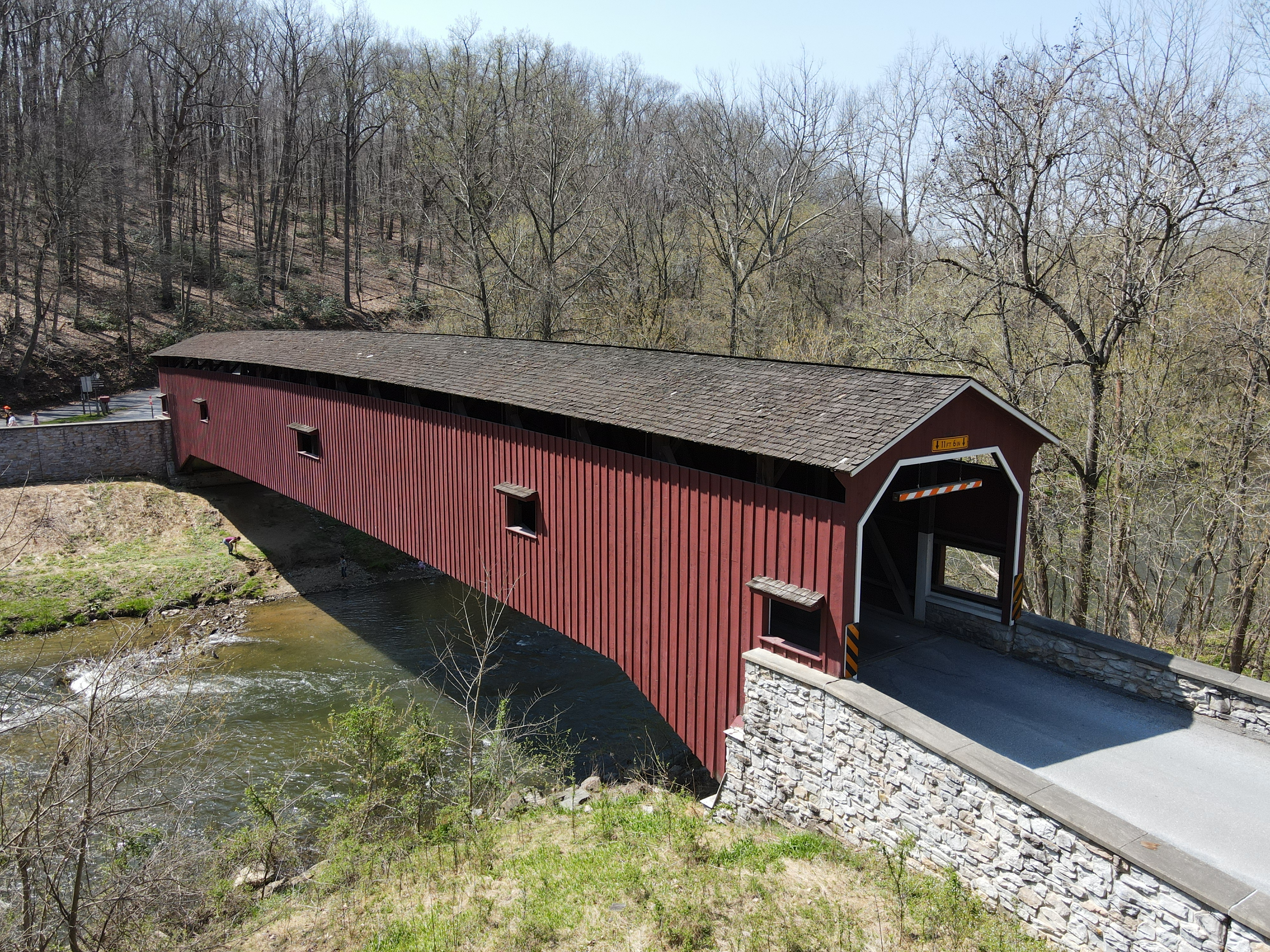
A view of the bridge from the air #2

== See also ==
- List of bridges on the National Register of Historic Places in Pennsylvania
- List of covered bridges in Lancaster County, Pennsylvania
- National Register of Historic Places listings in Lancaster County, Pennsylvania
