= Cocalico Bridge =

Cocalico Bridge can refer to:

Bridges spanning the Cocalico Creek in Lancaster County, Pennsylvania:

- Bucher's Mill Covered Bridge, the Cocalico #2 Bridge
- Keller's Mill Covered Bridge, the Cocalico #5 Bridge
- Zook's Mill Covered Bridge, the Cocalico #7 Bridge
