= List of covered bridges in Lancaster County, Pennsylvania =

Lancaster County, Pennsylvania

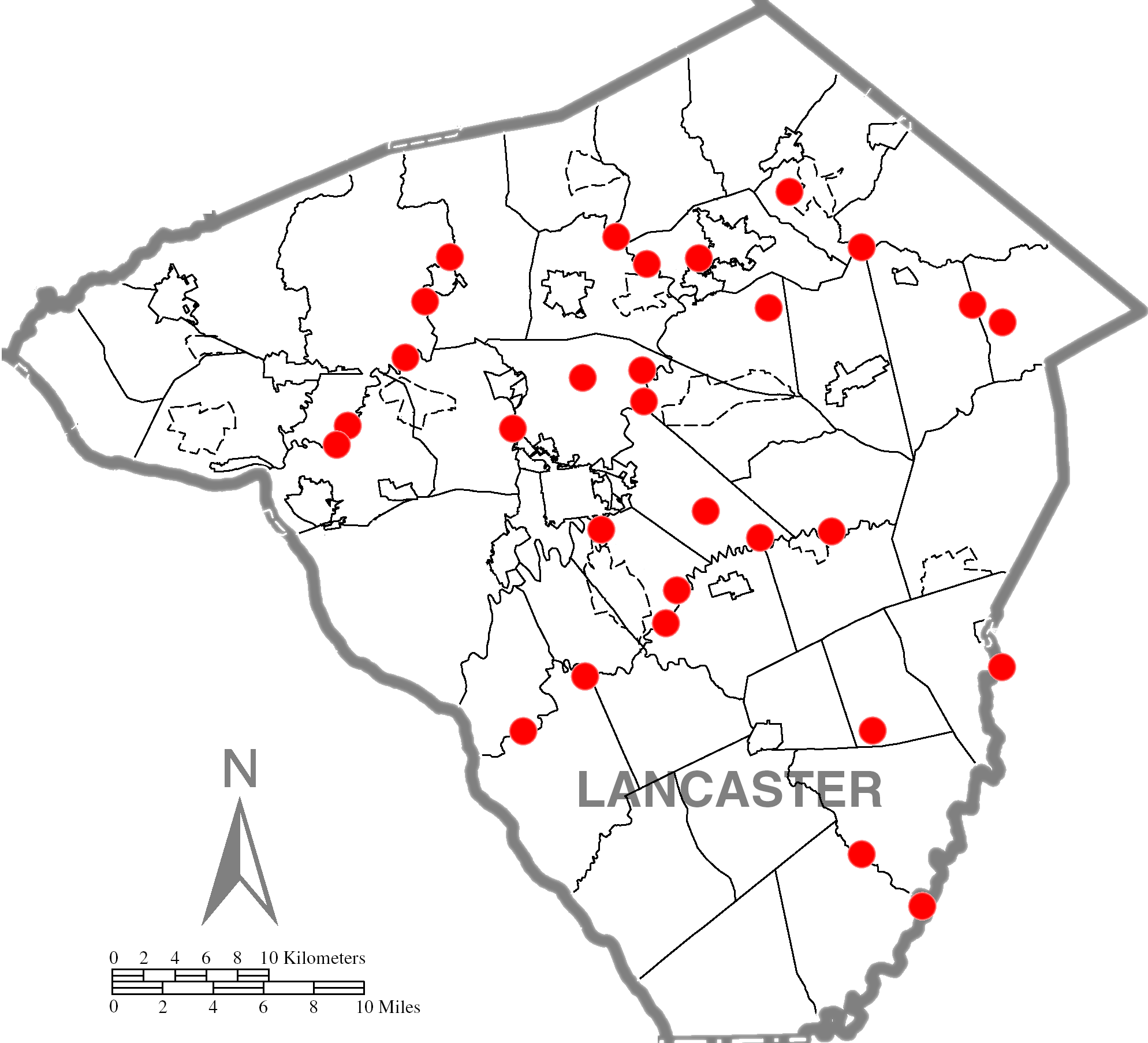
Map of the 29 existing covered bridges as of October, 2006 (clickable)

The following is a list of covered bridges in Lancaster County, Pennsylvania USA. Lancaster County has the most covered bridges in Pennsylvania with 28 covered bridges. Parke County, Indiana has the most covered bridges of any county in the United States with 31 covered bridges All of the covered bridges in Lancaster County, except for the Hunsecker's Mill Covered Bridge, Kurtz's Mill Covered Bridge, and the Willow Hill Covered Bridge, are listed on the National Register of Historic Places. Most have been on the list since 1980. The WGCB numbering prefix for the county is 38-36

The bridges are an important tourist attraction, both economically and culturally. This is due to both their historical significance and, being in the heart of Pennsylvania Dutch country, the frequent, iconic Amish horse and buggies bridge crossings. They are often visited in the form of covered bridge driving tours.

== History ==
In the early to late 1800s there were approximately 1,500 covered bridges in the state of Pennsylvania. That number has decreased to just over 200 bridges, with more located in Lancaster County than any other county in the state. The remaining covered bridges in the county are a remnant of a time when most bridges in the United States were made from wood, since wood was relatively inexpensive and easy to acquire. Bridge making, however, was anything but easy and required significant cost, effort, and time. The cost of the building the bridges was covered by government funds or by private individuals building bridges across their land. Since the bridges were built from wood, they were covered to provide protection from the weather, dramatically extending the life of the bridges. Nevertheless, as floods and fires destroyed more bridges, they were eventually replaced or bypassed with more durable and longer-lasting reinforced concrete and steel beam bridges. Most of the existing bridges are owned by the county government which is responsible for periodic upkeep and maintenance.

=== Modern status ===
Throughout the years, many of the existing covered bridges have been destroyed, but were later reconstructed. For example, in 1972 a number of the county's covered bridges were either destroyed or badly damaged as a result of flooding caused by Hurricane Agnes. Notably, the Zook's Mill Covered Bridge managed to survive despite being filled with a few feet of water. The Willow Hill Covered Bridge, a relatively new bridge built in 1962, is a reconstructed bridge using materials recovered from the old Miller's Farm and Good's Fording covered bridges.

== Design ==
The covered bridges in Lancaster County are all built of similar construction and appearance. Some of this is because many of the existing bridges were built by the same man, Elias McMellen, who built 12 of the existing bridges. The most common construction method used was that of the Burr arch truss. It is found in its single and double span forms in almost all of the covered bridges in the county, except for the Landis Mill Covered Bridge, a multiple kingpost design. The Pine Grove Covered Bridge and Herr's Mill Covered Bridge (now gone) are the county's only double span covered bridges. While most of the bridges are situated in remote locations where there is limited traffic, a number of the bridges, such as Jackson's Sawmill Covered Bridge, were later reinforced with steel beams underneath the bridge floor and steel hanger rods on the sides to support heavier traffic or give the bridge additional support.

Historically, the Lancaster County covered bridges were painted with red sides and all-white portals. Today most of the bridges retain this pattern, however, some of the portals are painted red with white trim (such as on the Zook's Mill Covered Bridge) or all-red (such as on the Pool Forge Covered Bridge). A number of these bridges also have the side panels painted red on the inside of the bridge while leaving the trusses unpainted. The Keller's Mill Covered Bridge is painted all-white, the only one of its kind in the county. Three of the bridges, Buck Hill Covered Bridge, Schenck's Mill Covered Bridge, and Shearer's Covered Bridge, have horizontal side boards. The rest of the bridges have vertical side boards.

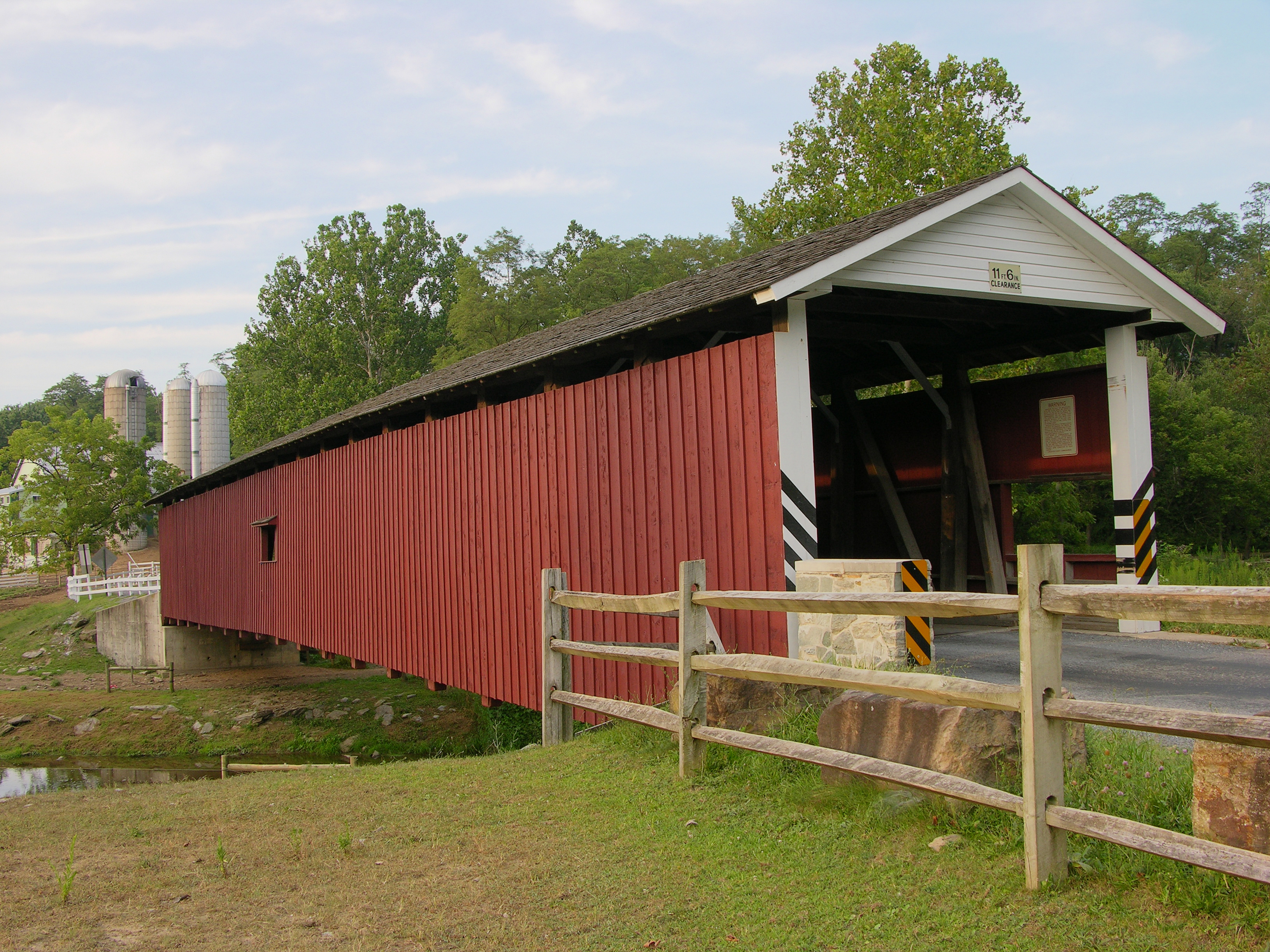
The traditional colors of a Lancaster County covered bridge: red sides and white portals

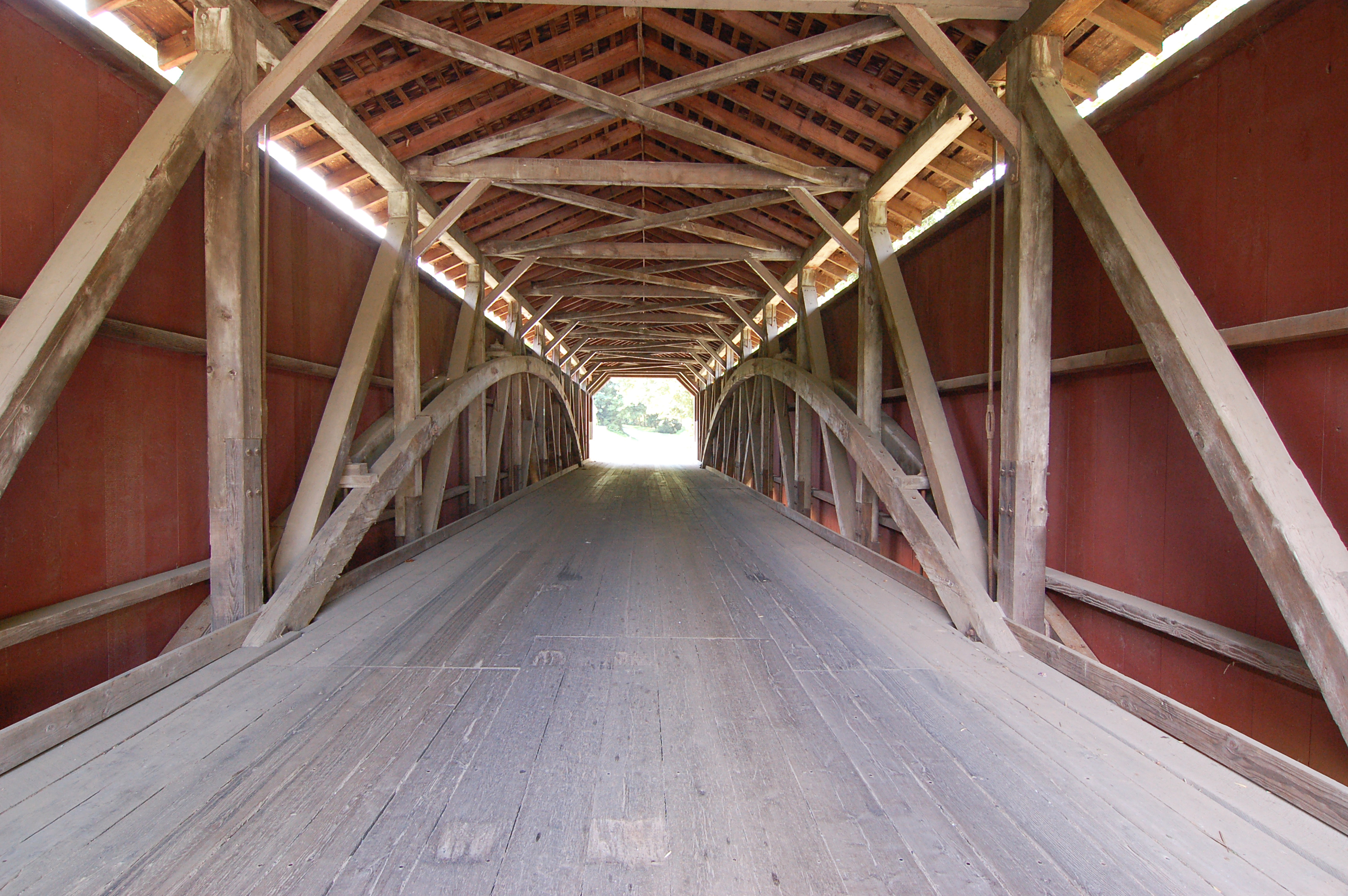
An example of the Burr arch truss design used in most of Lancaster County's covered bridges

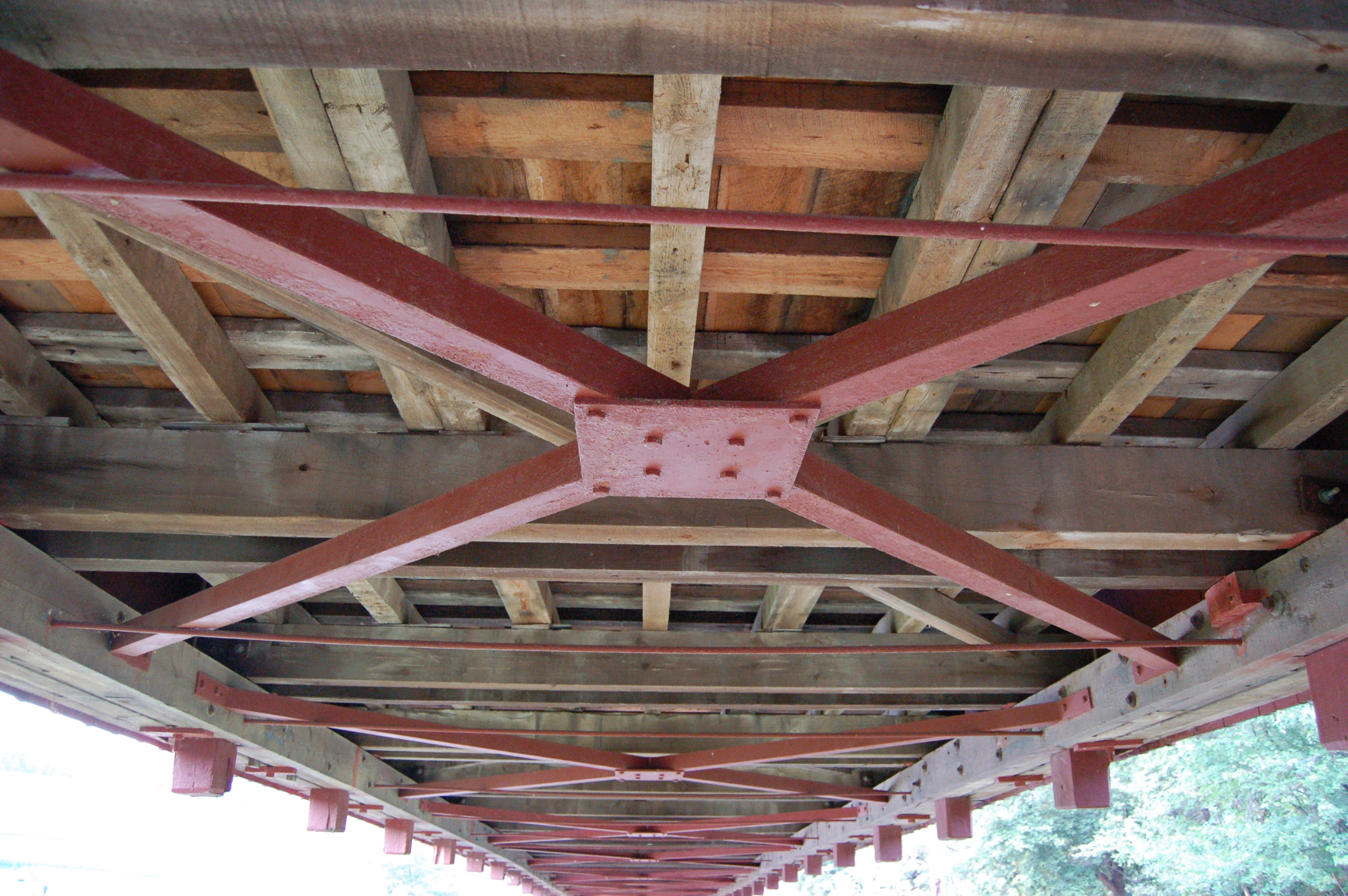
The underside of the Jackson's Sawmill Covered Bridge showing the reinforced steel bracing

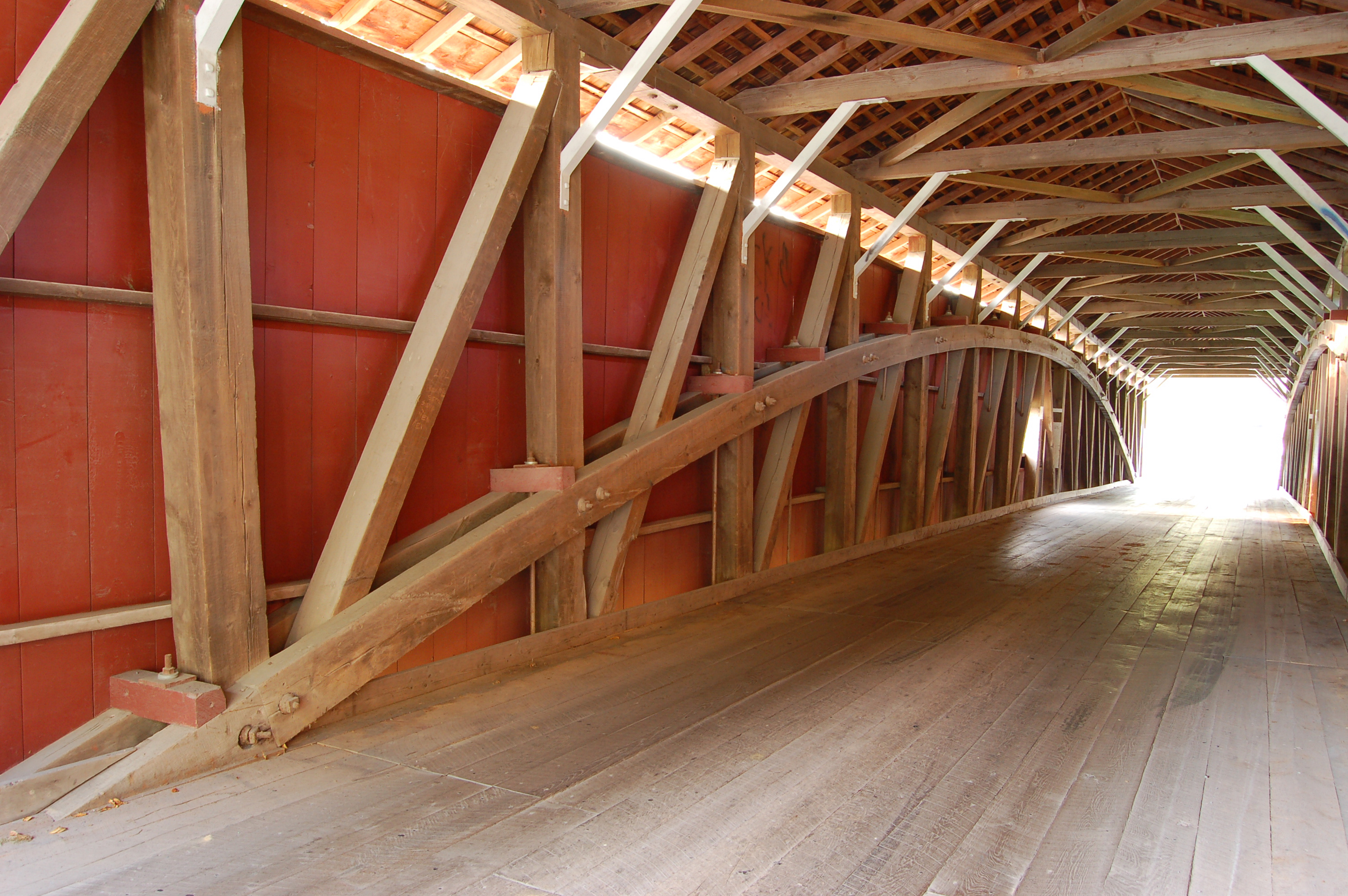
A Burr arch truss reinforced with steel hanger rods

== Existing bridges ==
Bridge	Image	WGCB Code	Truss Type	Length	Year	Original Builder	Open to Traffic?	Location
Baumgardener's Covered Bridge		38-36-25	Burr arch truss	120 feet (37 m)	1860 rebuilt 1987	Davis Kitch	Yes (one lane)	
Bitzer's Mill Covered Bridge		38-36-04	Burr arch truss	90 feet (27 m)	1846	George Fink and Sam Reamsnyder	Yes (one lane)	
Bucher's Mill Covered Bridge		38-36-12	Burr arch truss	64 feet (20 m)	1891 rebuilt 1892	Elias McMellen	Yes (one lane)	
Buck Hill Covered Bridge		38-36-15	Burr arch truss	58 feet (18 m)	1825 rebuilt 1844 moved 1966	Unknown	No (Foot traffic only if given permission by the owner)	
Colemanville Covered Bridge		38-36-26	Burr arch truss	170 feet (52 m)	1856 rebuilt 1938 1973 and 1992	James C. Carpenter	Yes (one lane)	
Erb's Covered Bridge		38-36-34	Burr arch truss	70 feet (21 m)	1849 rebuilt 1887	Unknown	Yes (one lane)	
Forry's Mill Covered Bridge		38-36-28	Burr arch truss	103 feet (31 m)	1869 rebuilt 1925	Elias McMellen	Yes (one lane)	
Hunsecker's Mill Covered Bridge		38-36-06	Burr arch truss	180 feet (55 m)	1843 rebuilt 1973	John Russell	Yes (one lane)	
Jackson's Sawmill Covered Bridge		38-36-33	Burr arch truss	139 feet (42 m)	1878 rebuilt 1985	John Smith and Samuel Stauffer	Yes (one lane)	
Kauffman's Distillery Covered Bridge		38-36-32	Burr arch truss	96 feet (29 m)	1857 rebuilt 1874	James C. Carpenter	Yes (one lane)	
Keller's Mill Covered Bridge		38-36-13	Burr arch truss	74 feet (23 m)	1873 rebuilt 1891 moved 2006 rebuilt 2009 reopened December 2010	Elias McMellen	Yes (one lane)	
Kurtz's Mill Covered Bridge		38-36-03	Burr arch truss	94 feet (29 m)	1876 destroyed during the Agnes flood of '72 moved to Lancaster County Central Park and last rebuilt by David Esh in 1975	W. W. Upp	Yes (one lane)	
Landis Mill Covered Bridge		38-36-16	Multiple king post	53 feet (16 m)	1873	Elias McMellen	Yes (one lane)	
Leaman's Place Covered Bridge		38-36-20	Burr arch truss	113 feet (34 m)	1845 rebuilt 1893	James C. Carpenter	Yes (one lane)	
Lime Valley Covered Bridge		38-36-23	Burr arch truss	103 feet (31 m)	1871	Joseph Cramer or Elias McMellen	Yes (one lane)	
Mercer's Mill Covered Bridge†		38-36-38	Burr arch truss	80 feet (24 m)	1880	B. J. Carter	Yes (one lane)	
Neff's Mill Covered Bridge		38-36-22	Burr arch truss	102 feet (31 m)	1824 rebuilt 1875 rehabilitated 2018	Christian Brackbill	Yes (one lane)	
Pine Grove Covered Bridge†		38-36-41	Burr arch truss	195 feet (59 m)	1884	Elias McMellen	Yes (one lane)	
Pinetown Bushong's Mill Covered Bridge		38-36-05	Burr arch truss	133 feet (41 m)	1867 rebuilt 1973 closed 2011 reopened January 2014	Elias McMellen	Yes (one lane)	
Pool Forge Covered Bridge		38-36-01	Burr arch truss	99 feet (30 m)	1859	Levi Fink and Elias McMellen	Yes	
Red Run Covered Bridge		38-36-10	Burr arch truss	107 feet (33 m)	1866	Elias McMellen	No (Private property)	
Schenck's Mill Covered Bridge		38-36-30	Burr arch truss	96 feet (29 m)	1847 rebuilt 1855 accidentally damaged by a truck on December 31, 2017	Charles Malhorn and Levi Fink	Yes (one lane)	
Shearer's Covered Bridge		38-36-31	Burr arch truss	89 feet (27 m)	1847 rebuilt 1855 moved 1971	Jacob Clare	No (Foot traffic only)	
Siegrist's Mill Covered Bridge		38-36-37	Burr arch truss	88 feet (27 m)	1885 withstood Agnes flood of '72 closed September 2011 reopened August 2013	James C. Carpenter	Yes (one lane)	
Weaver's Mill Covered Bridge		38-36-02	Burr arch truss	85 feet (26 m)	1878	B. J. Carter and J. F. Stauffer	Yes (one lane)	
White Rock Forge Covered Bridge		38-36-18	Burr arch truss	103 feet (31 m)	1847 rebuilt 1884	John Russell and Elias McMellen	Yes (one lane)	
Willow Hill Covered Bridge		38-36-43	Burr arch truss	93 feet (28 m)	1962	Roy Zimmerman	No (Foot traffic only)	
Zook's Mill Covered Bridge		38-36-14	Burr arch truss	74 feet (23 m)	1849 very little flooding from Cocalico Creek but has a high water marker from the Agnes 72 flood.	Henry Zook	Yes (one lane)	

== Former bridges ==
- Bellbank Covered Bridge^{†} (burnt in 1979)
- Daniel Good's Fording Covered Bridge (Used to make Willow Hill Covered Bridge in 1962)
- Miller's Farm Covered Bridge (Used to make Willow Hill Covered Bridge in 1962)
- Pennsylvania Railroad Bridge^{‡} - Created in the 1820s, burnt during the American Civil War in July 1863. It was the longest covered bridge in the world (over a mile and a quarter in length).
- Risser's Mill Covered Bridge (burnt on July 8, 2002)

†Located on the border between Lancaster County and Chester County

‡Located on the border between Lancaster County and York County

== See also ==
- List of covered bridges in Columbia County, Pennsylvania
- List of covered bridges of Bradford, Sullivan and Lycoming Counties
