= Schenck's Mill Covered Bridge =

Covered bridge in Pennsylvania, US

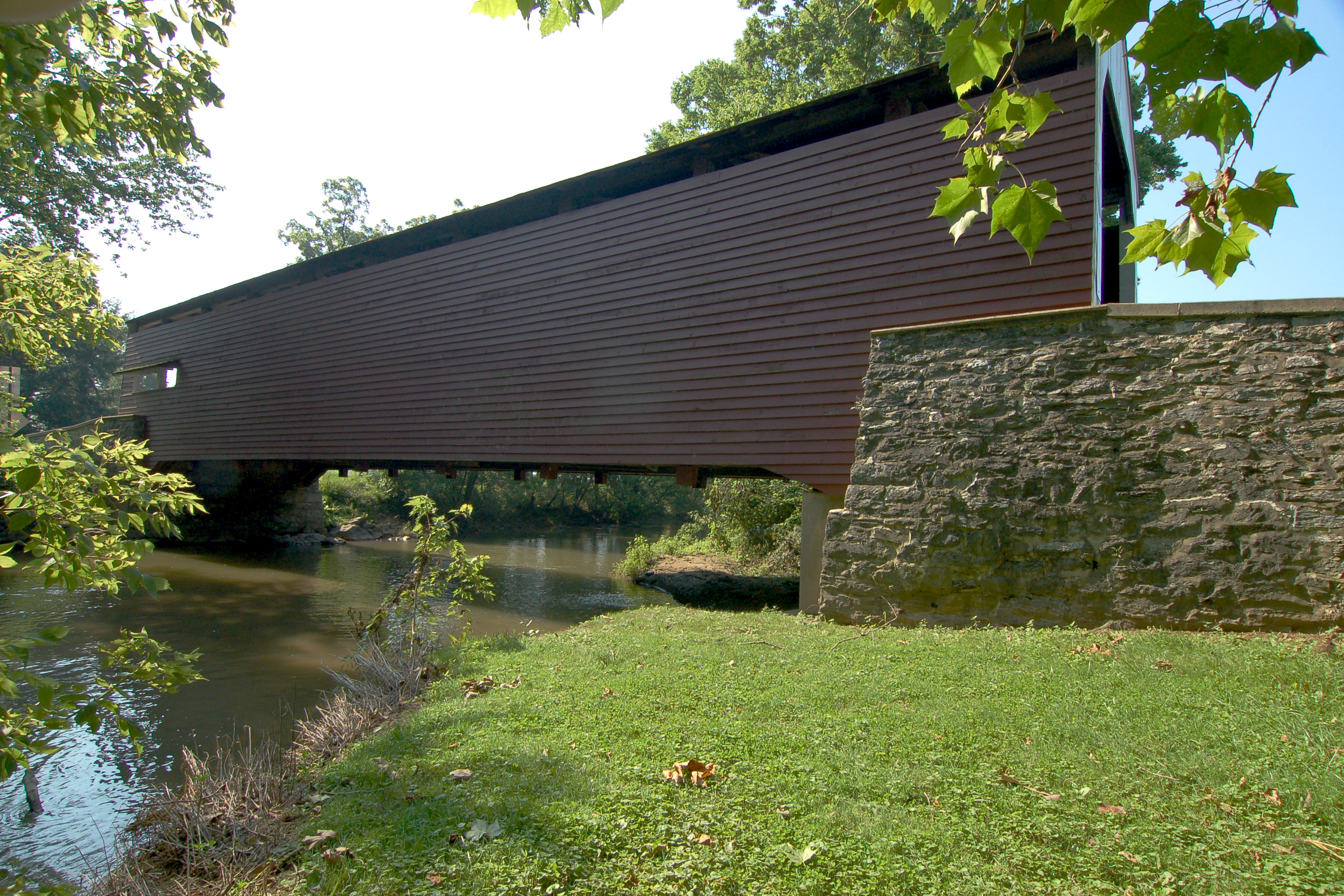
- Coordinates: 40.1160°N 76.4253°W
- Locale: Lancaster County, Pennsylvania, United States
- Official name: Big Chiques #4 Bridge

Characteristics
- Design: single span, double Burr arch truss
- Total length: 96 feet (29.3 m)

History
- Constructed by: Charles Malhorn and Levi Fink
- Construction end: 1847
- Rebuilt: 1855
- Schenck's Mill Covered Bridge
- U.S. National Register of Historic Places
- MPS: Covered Bridges of Lancaster County TR
- NRHP reference No.: 80003531
- Added to NRHP: December 10, 1980

Location
- Interactive map of Schenck's Mill Covered Bridge

The Schenk's Mill Covered Bridge or Shenk's Mill Covered Bridge is a covered bridge that spans the Big Chiques Creek in Lancaster County, Pennsylvania, United States. A county-owned and maintained bridge, its official designation is the Big Chiques #4 Bridge. (Chiques Creek was known as Chickies Creek until 2002).

The bridge has a single span, wooden, double Burr arch trusses design with the addition of steel hanger rods. The deck is made from oak planks. It is painted red, the traditional color of Lancaster County covered bridges, on both the inside and outside. Both approaches to the bridge are painted in the traditional white color. It is one of only 3 covered bridges in the county with horizontal side boards.

On December 31, 2017, a truck driver from Arizona damaged the bridge while attempting to cross it, claiming to be lost on the way to Baltimore and following his GPS.

The bridge's WGCB Number is 38–36–30. Added in 1980, it is listed on the National Register of Historic Places as structure number 80003531. It is located at 40°6′57.6″N 76°25′31.1″W (40.1160, -76.4253).

== History ==
The bridge was built in 1847 by Charles Malhorn and Levi Fink. The bridge was rebuilt in 1855.

== Dimensions ==
- Length: 80 feet (24.4 m) span and 96 feet (29 m) total length
- Width: 13 feet 10 inches (4.22 m) clear deck and 15 feet (4.6 m) total width
- Overhead clearance: 12 feet (3.7 m)
- Underclearance: 10 feet 6 inches (3.20 m)

== Gallery ==
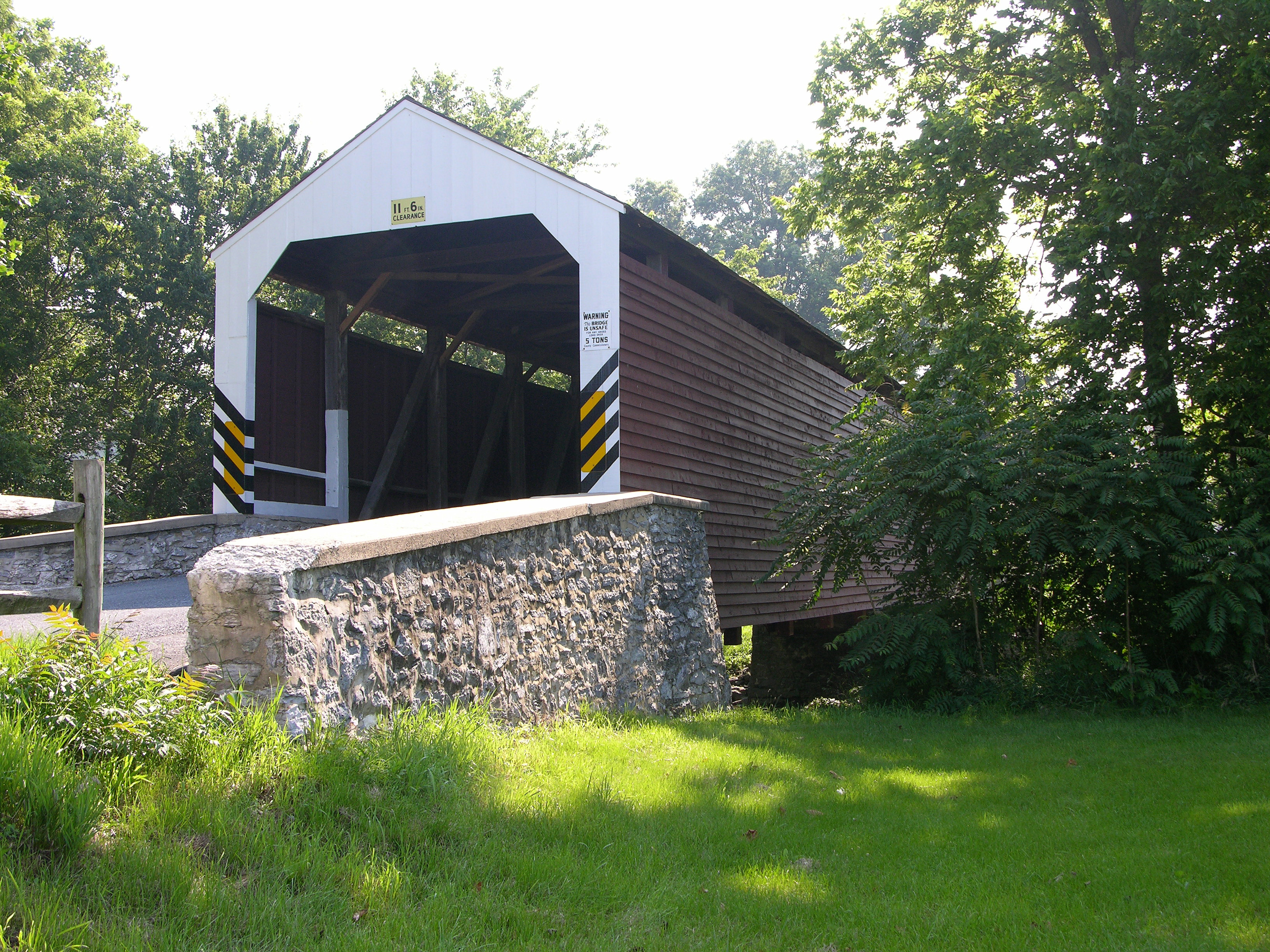
Three quarters view of the bridge

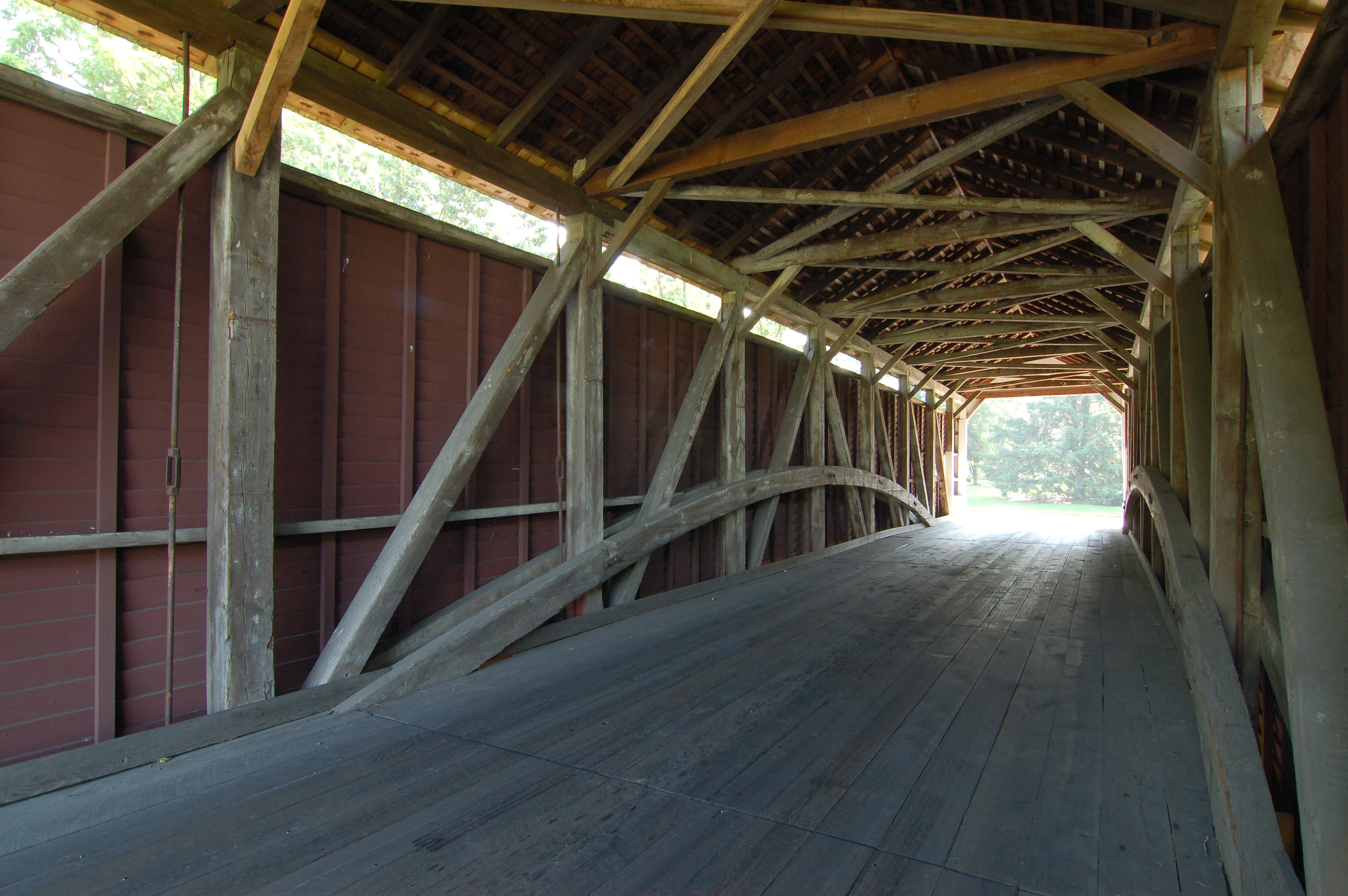
The inside of the bridge showing the Burr arch truss

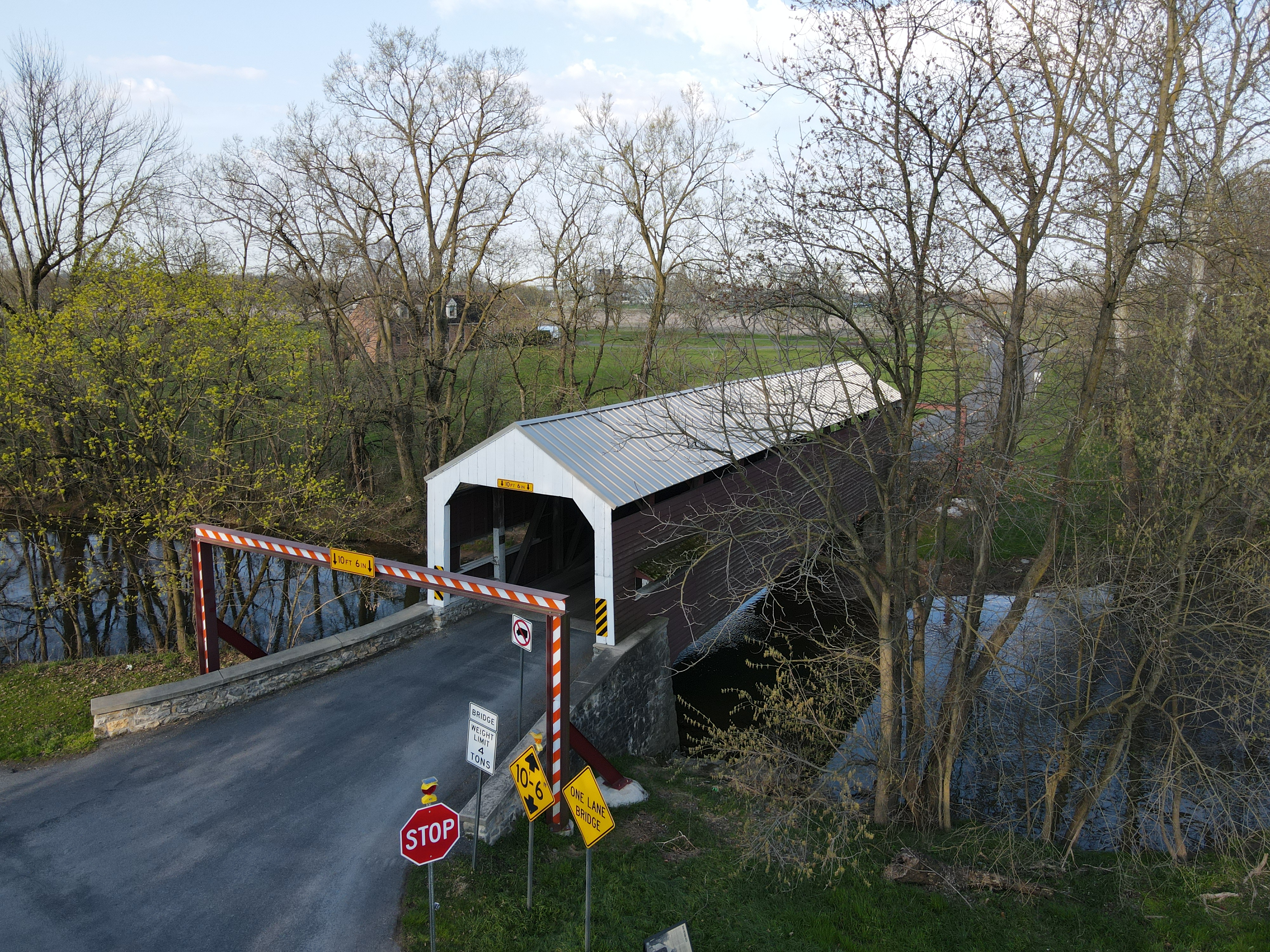
Three quarters view of the bridge from the air

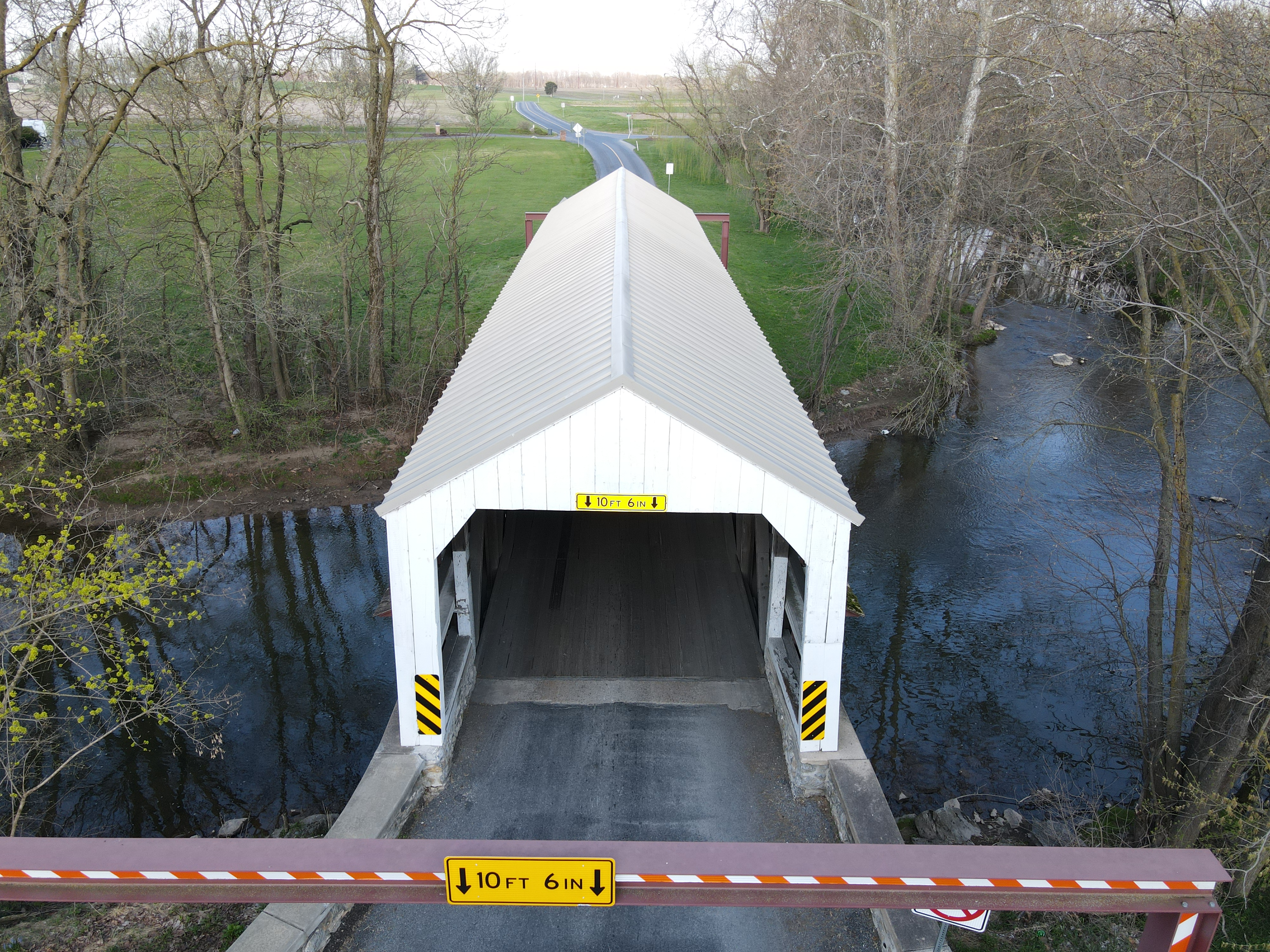
Approach view of bridge from the air

== See also ==
- Burr arch truss
- List of Lancaster County covered bridges
