= Kurtz's Mill Covered Bridge =

Covered bridge in Pennsylvania, United States

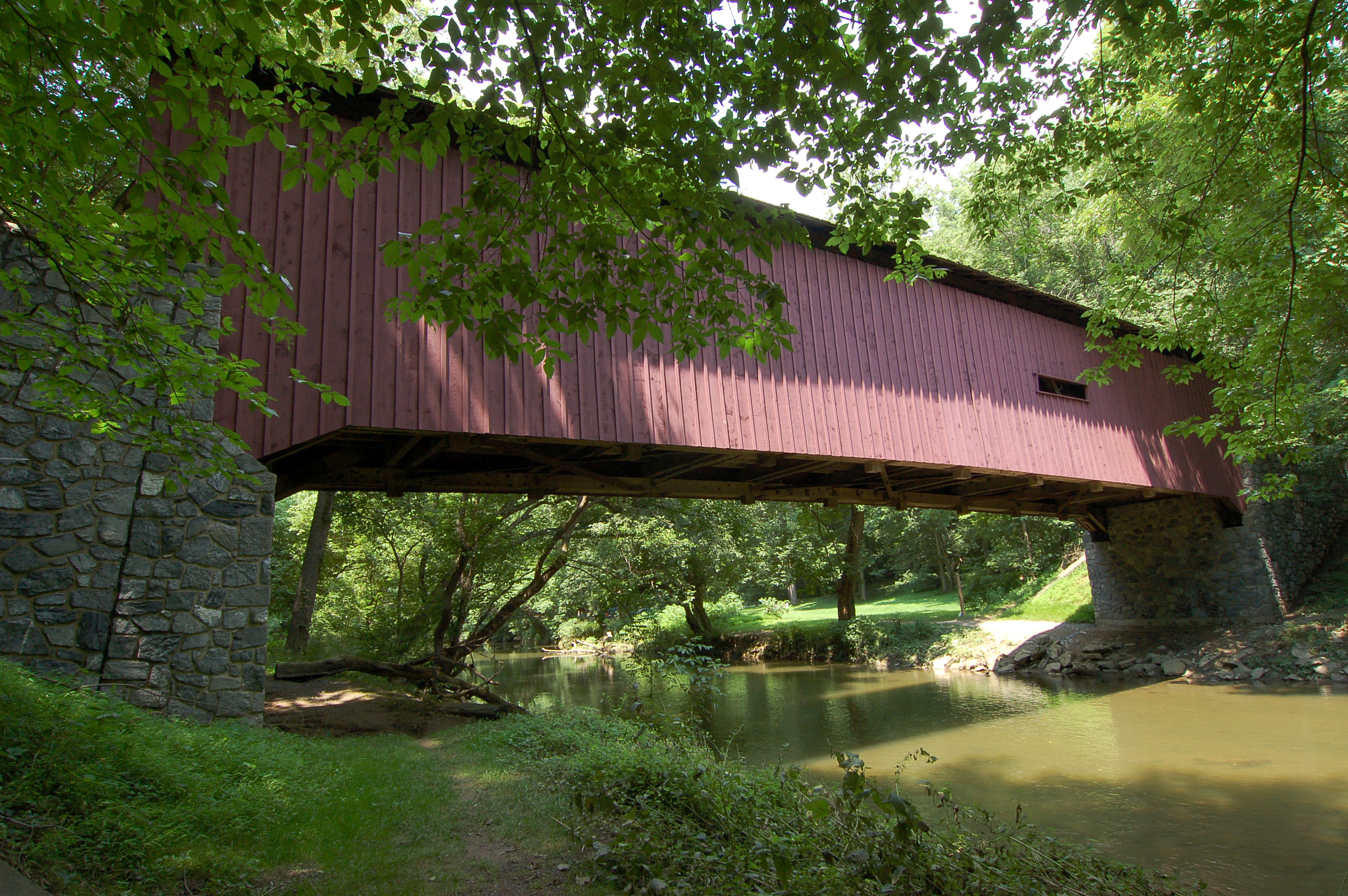
- Coordinates: 40.0135°N 76.2833°W
- Locale: Lancaster County, Pennsylvania, United States

Characteristics
- Design: single span, double Burr arch truss
- Total length: 94 feet (28.7 m)

History
- Constructed by: W. W. Upp
- Construction start: 1876

Location
- Interactive map of Kurtz's Mill Covered Bridge

The Kurtz's Mill Covered Bridge is a covered bridge that spans Mill Creek in the Lancaster County Park in Lancaster County, Pennsylvania, United States. The bridge is also known as the County Park Covered Bridge, Baer's Mill Covered Bridge, Isaac Baer's Mill Bridge, Keystone Mill Covered Bridge, Binder Tongue Carrier Covered Bridge, and Mill 2A Covered Bridge. The bridge is accessible to road traffic from within the park.

The bridge has a single span, wooden, double burr arch trusses design with the addition of steel hanger rods. The deck is made from oak planks. It is painted red, the traditional color of Lancaster County covered bridges, on both the inside and outside. Both approaches to the bridge are painted in red with white trim.

The bridge's WGCB Number is 38–36–03. Unlike most historic covered bridges in the county, it is not listed on the National Register of Historic Places. It is located at 40°0′48.6″N 76°16′59.9″W (40.0151, -76.2822).

== History ==
The bridge was built in 1876 by W. W. Upp originally over the Conestoga River. In June 1972, it was damaged by the floodwaters caused by Hurricane Agnes. It was repaired by David Esh in 1975 and moved to its present location in the Lancaster County Park over Mill Creek, a tributary of the Conestoga River. Kurtz's covered bridge was first constructed in 1876. It spans 94 feet long, this covered bridge once spanned the Conestoga River. But after the Flood of 72, it was moved to its present location across the Mill Creek at the Lancaster County Central Park and it was last rebuilt there in 1975.

== Dimensions ==
- Length: 94 feet (29 m) span and 90 feet (27 m) total length
- Width: 11 feet 8 inches (3.56 m) clear deck and 15 feet (4.6 m) total width
- Overhead clearance: 11 feet 6 inches (3.51 m)
- Underclearance: 19 feet 6 inches (5.94 m)

== Gallery ==
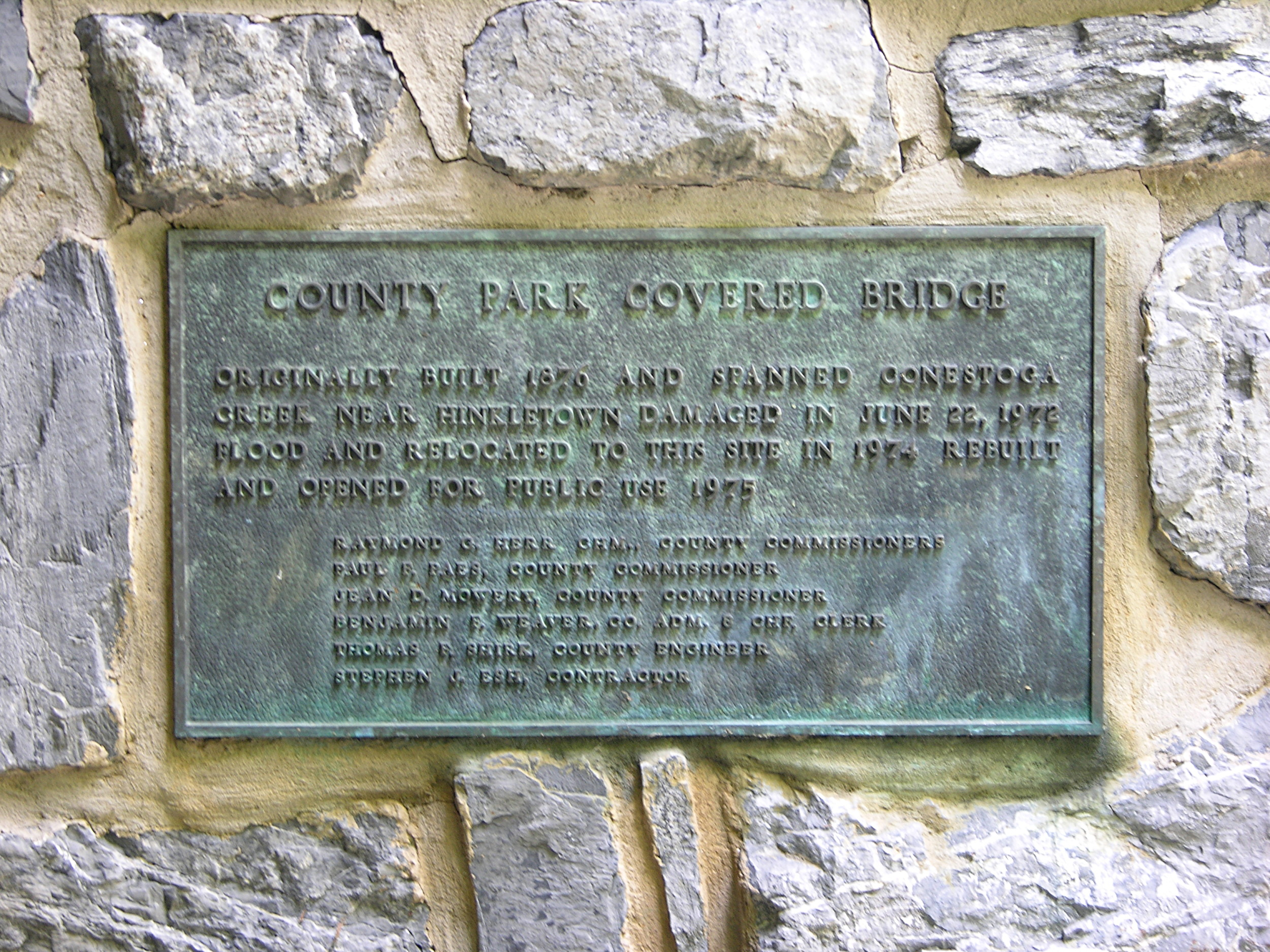
A metal nameplate describing history of the bridge

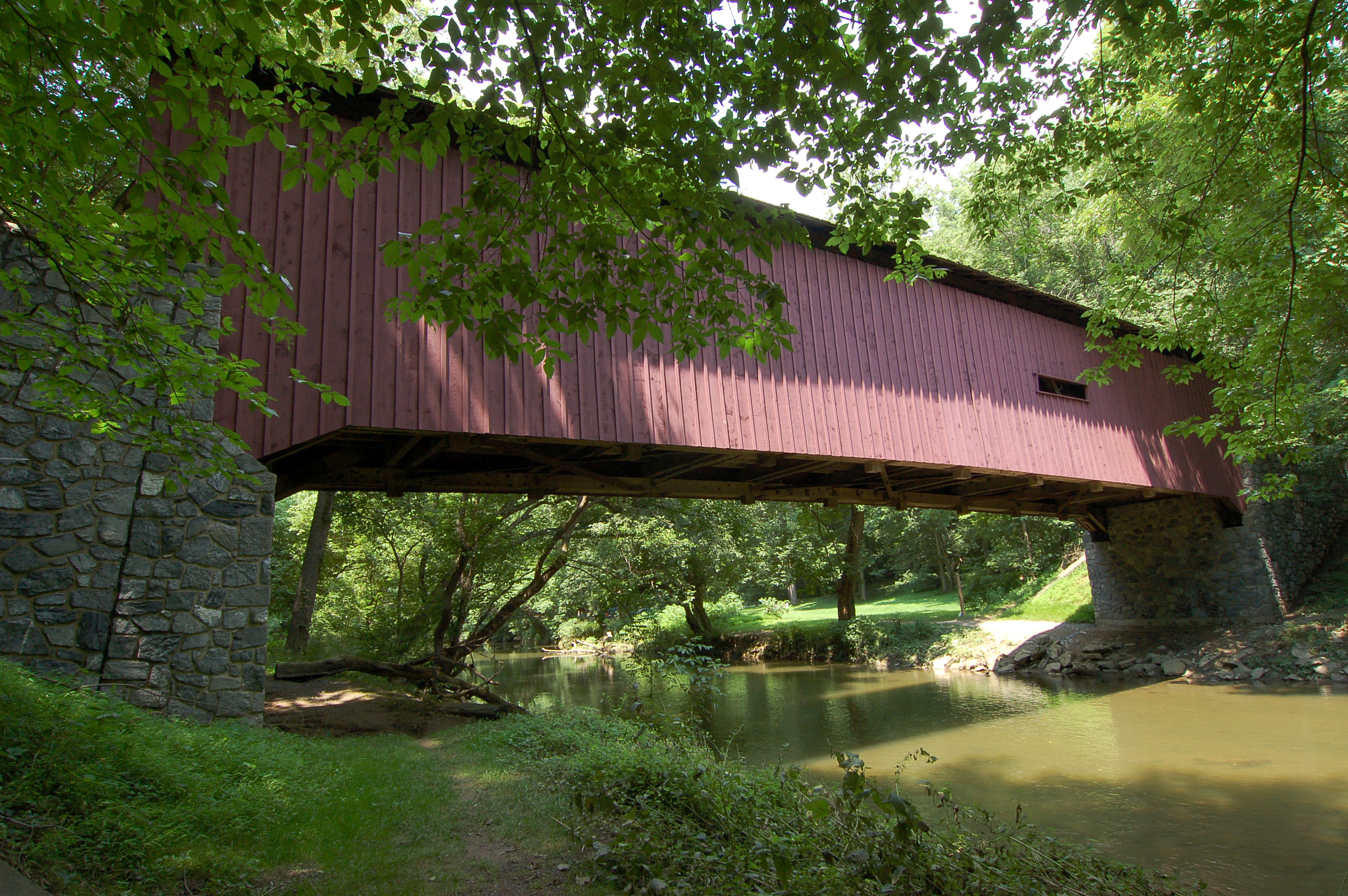
A view of the side of the bridge showing the surrounding forest

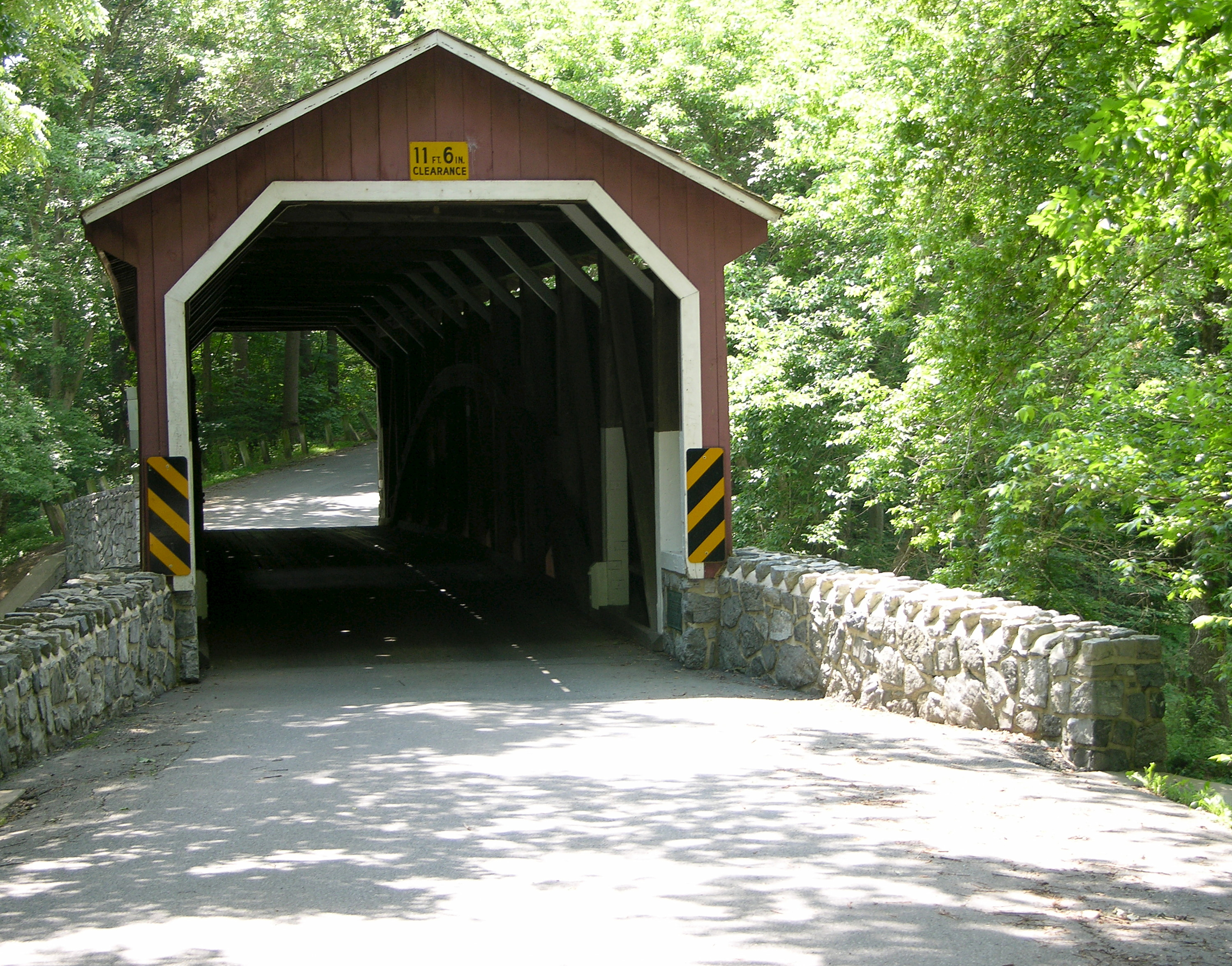
One of the approaches to the bridge

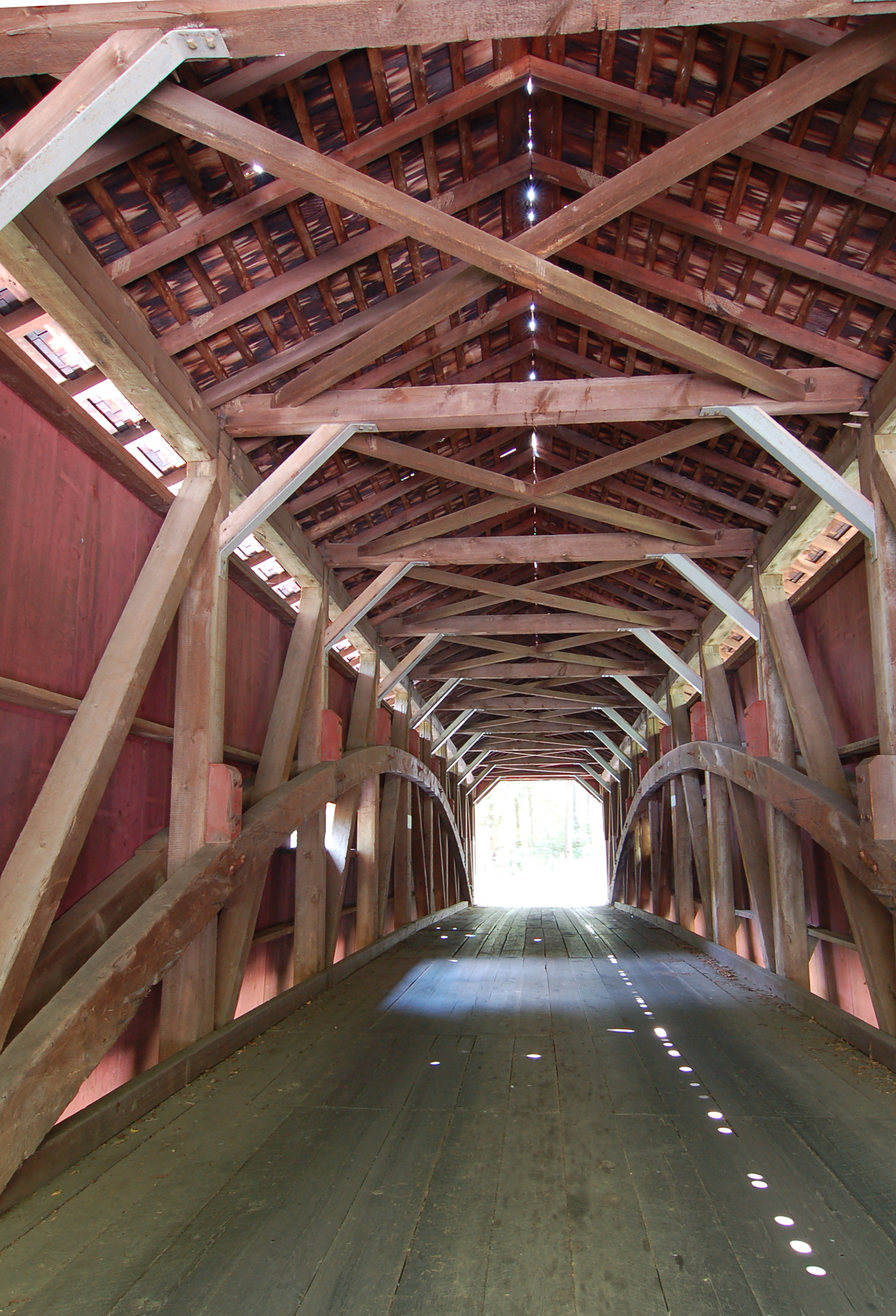
The inside of the bridge showing the Burr arch truss

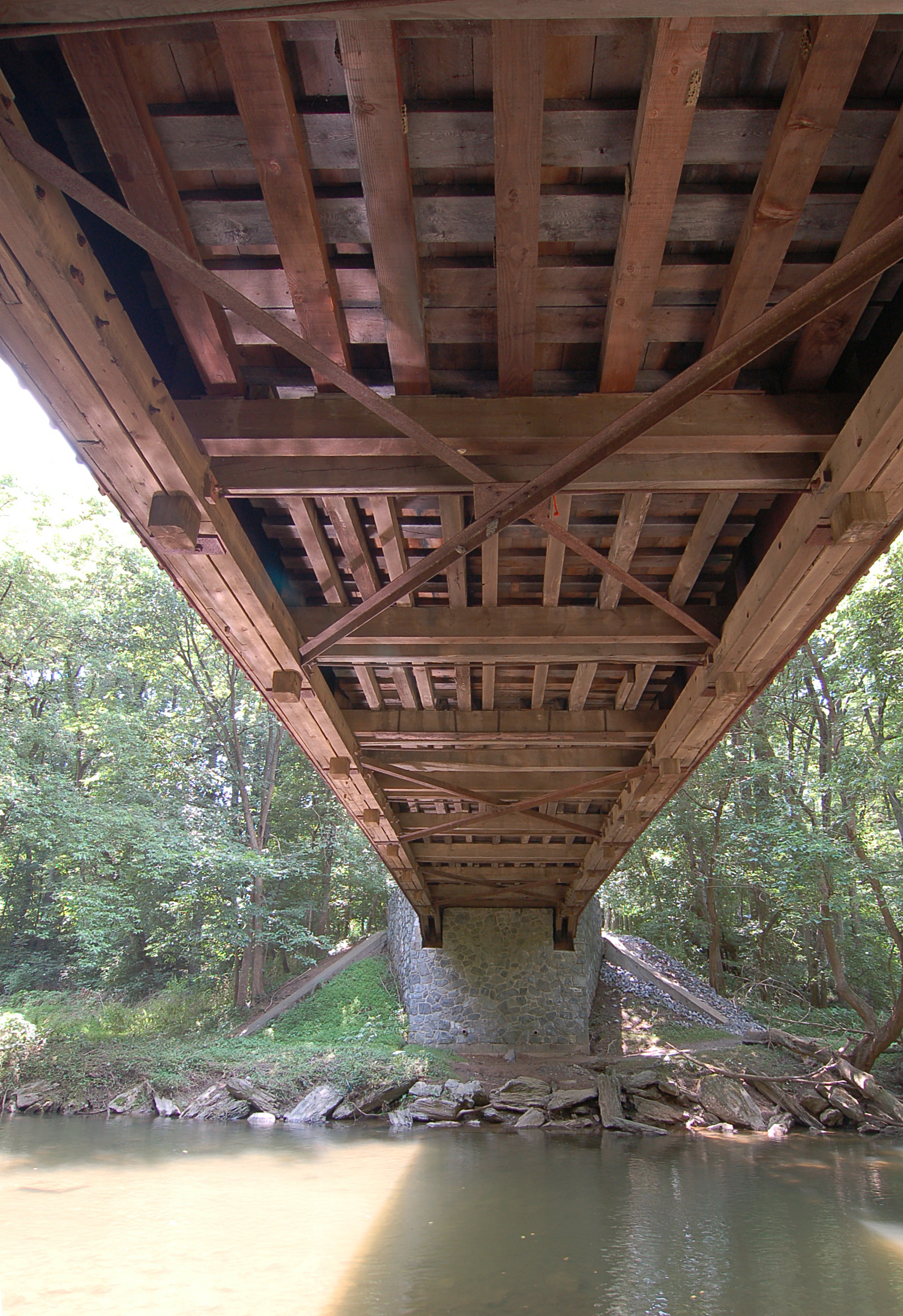
The underside of the bridge

== See also ==
- Burr arch truss
- List of Lancaster County covered bridges
