= Shearer's Covered Bridge =

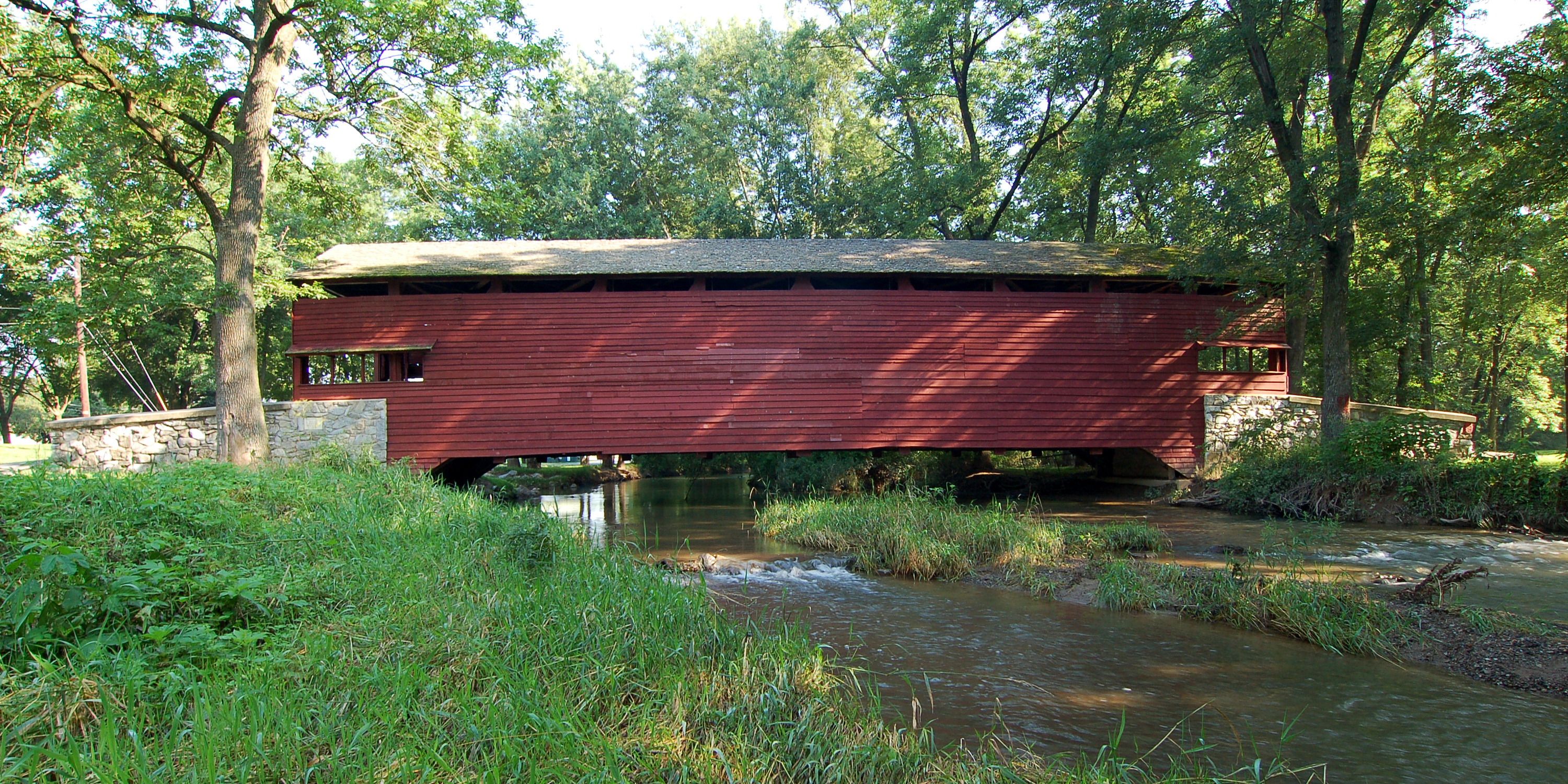
- Coordinates: 40.1715°N 76.3898°W
- Locale: Lancaster County, Pennsylvania, United States

Characteristics
- Design: single span, double Burr arch truss
- Total length: 89 feet (27.1 m)

History
- Constructed by: Jacob Clare
- Construction start: 1847
- Shearer's Covered Bridge
- U.S. National Register of Historic Places
- MPS: Covered Bridges of Lancaster County TR
- NRHP reference No.: 80003532
- Added to NRHP: December 10, 1980

Location
- Interactive map of Shearer's Covered Bridge

The Shearer's Covered Bridge is a covered bridge that spans the Big Chiques Creek in Lancaster County, Pennsylvania, United States. (Chiques Creek was known as Chickies Creek until 2002).

The bridge has a single span, wooden, double Burr arch trusses design. It is the only covered bridge in the county painted entirely in red, the traditional color of Lancaster County covered bridges, on both the inside and outside including both approaches. The other all red bridge, Pool Forge Covered Bridge, is only painted on the outside. It is one of only 3 covered bridges in the county with horizontal side boards.

The bridge's WGCB Number is 38–36–31. Added in 1980, it is listed on the National Register of Historic Places as structure number 80003532. It is located at 40°10′17.4″N 76°23′23.4″W (40.17150, -76.38983).

== History ==
The bridge was built in 1847 by Jacob Clare. It was rebuilt in 1855 and stayed there until it was moved in 1971 to its present location in the Manheim Memorial Park. It is 89 feet long and it's also the only covered bridge that does not allow motor vehicles.

== Dimensions ==
- Length: 89 feet (27.1 m) total length
- Width: 15 feet (4.6 m) total width
- Overhead clearance: 11 feet 6 inches (3.51 m)

== Gallery ==
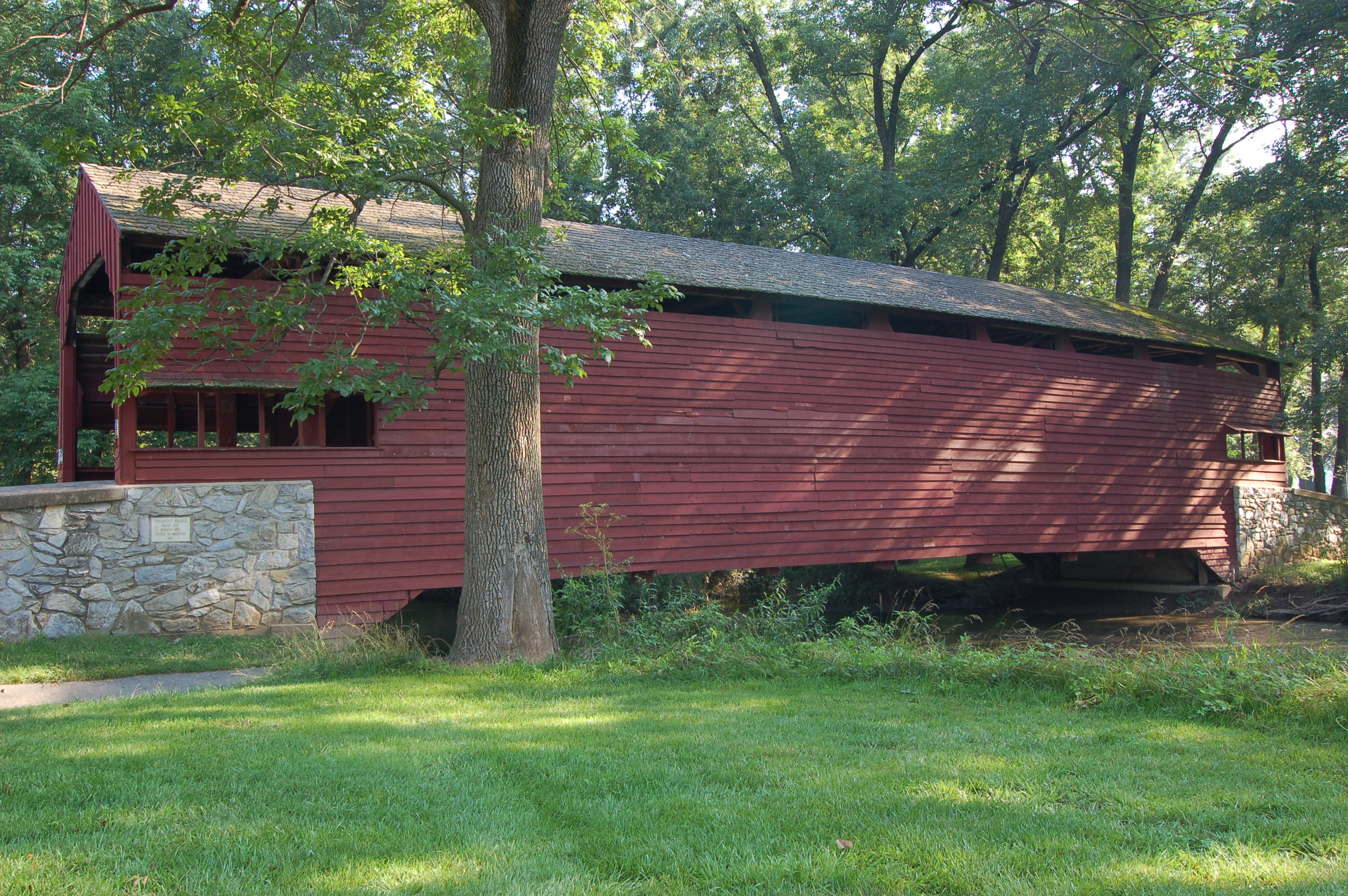
View of the bridge from the side

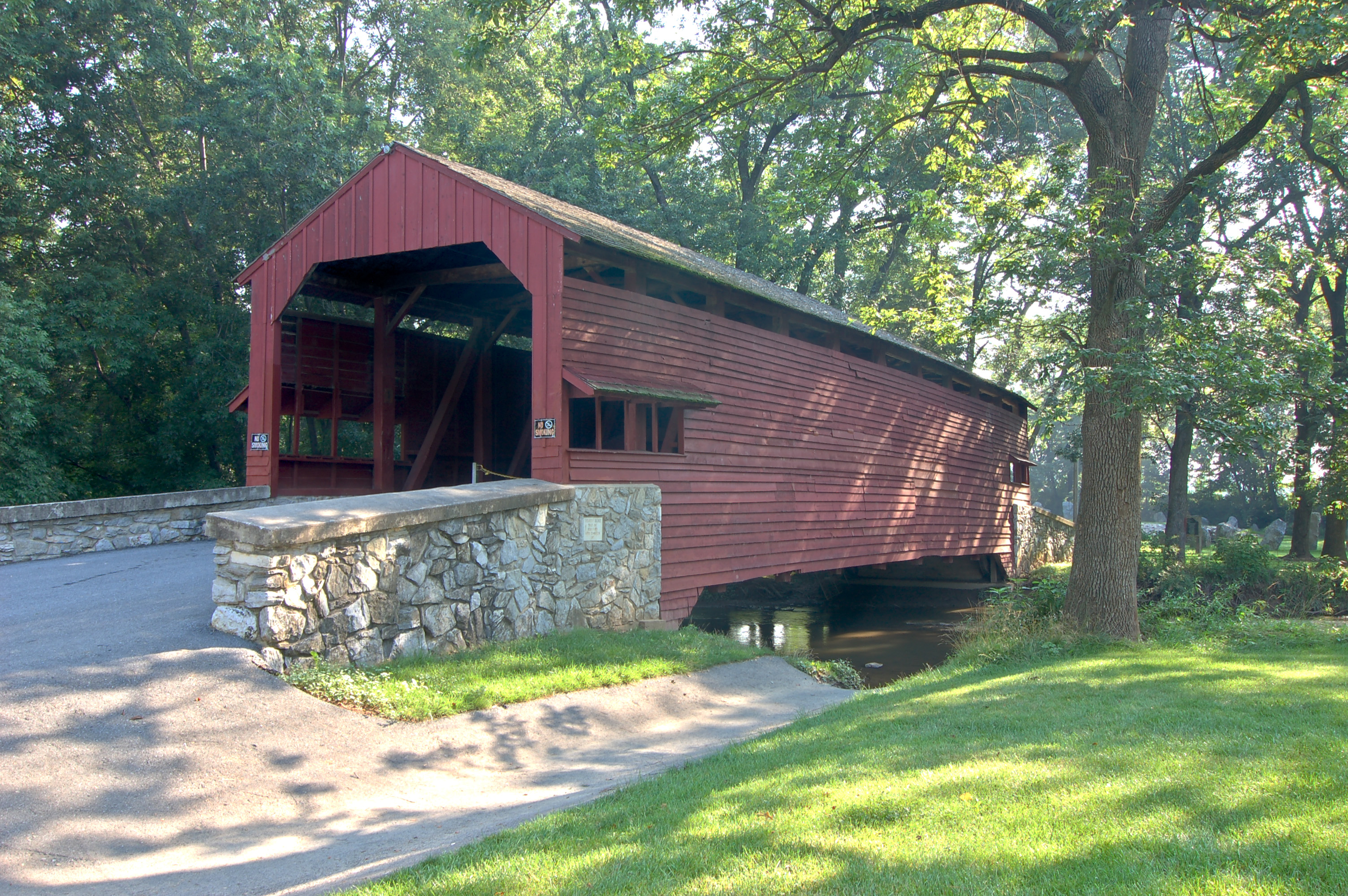
Three quarters view

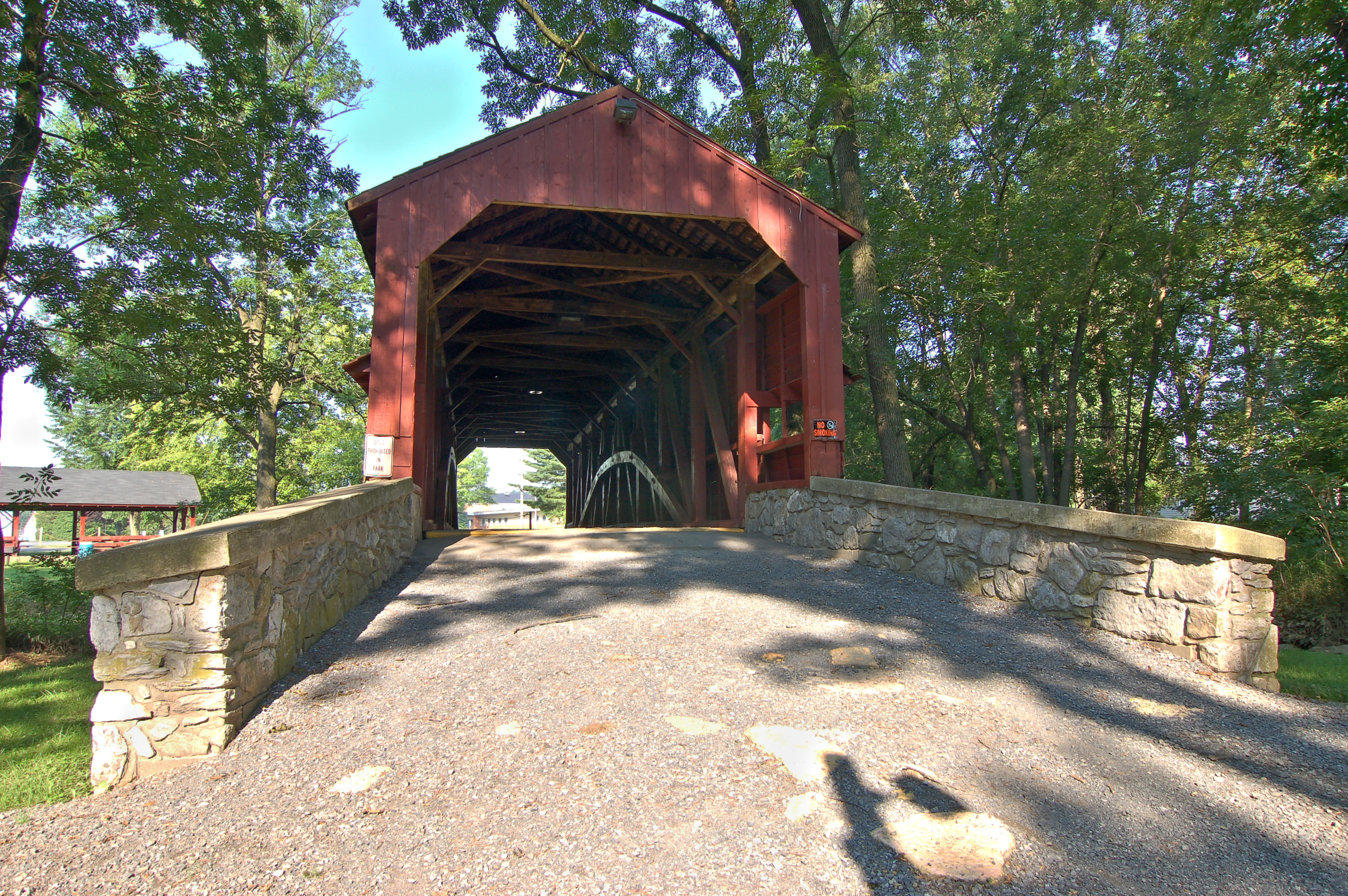
One of the approaches to the bridge

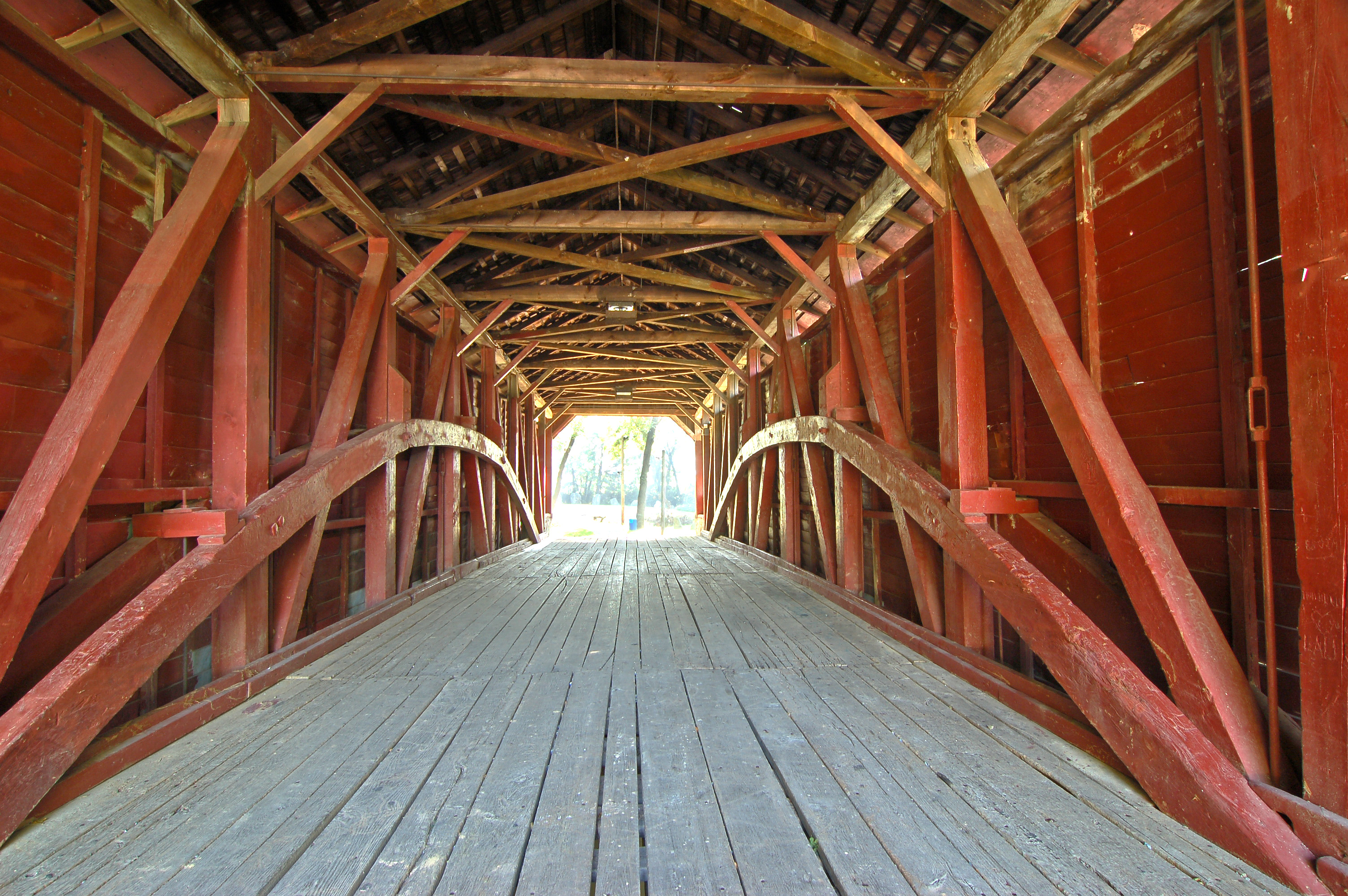
An inside view of the bridge

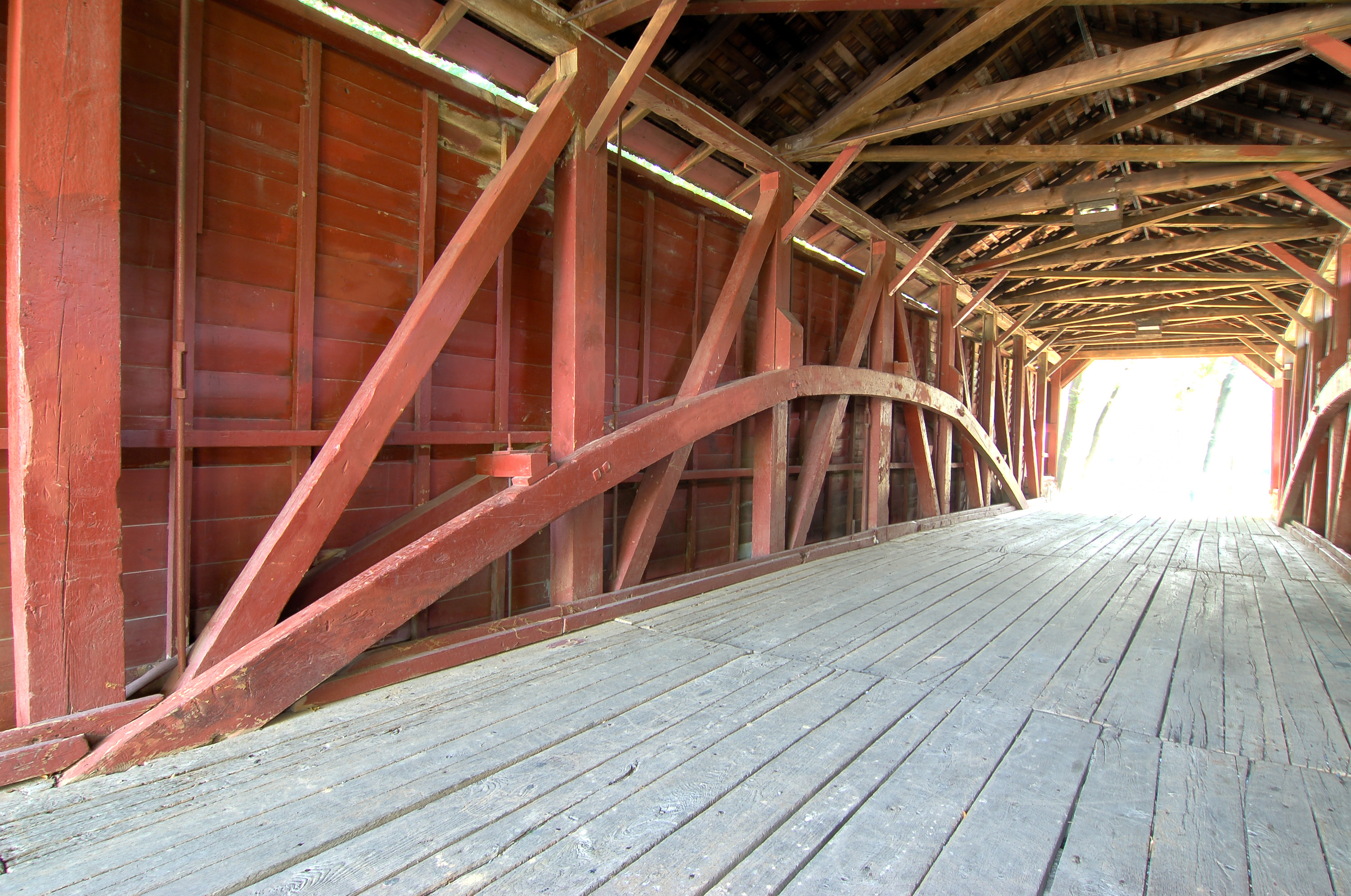
A closeup of the Burr arch truss

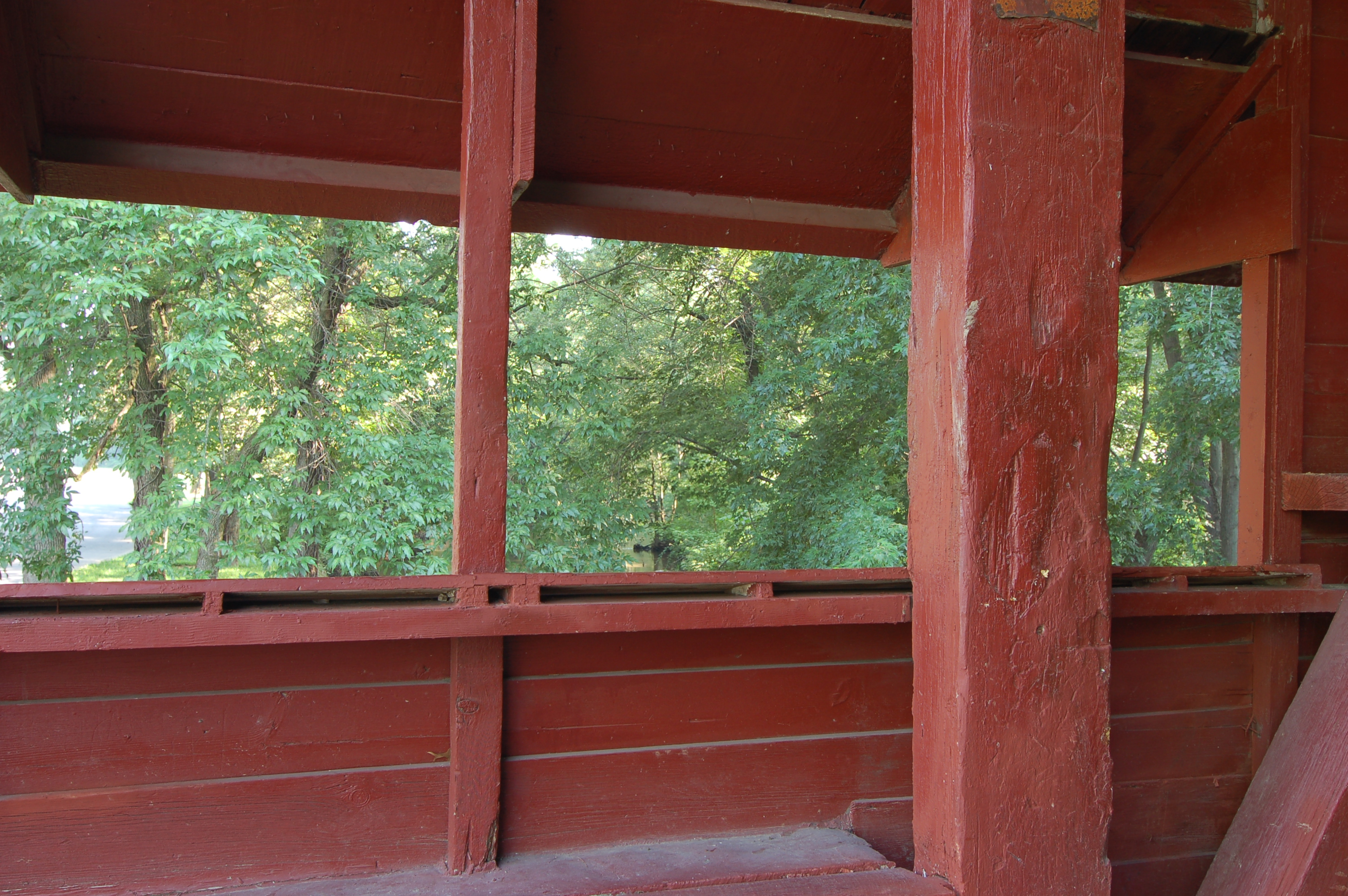
One of the bridge's window

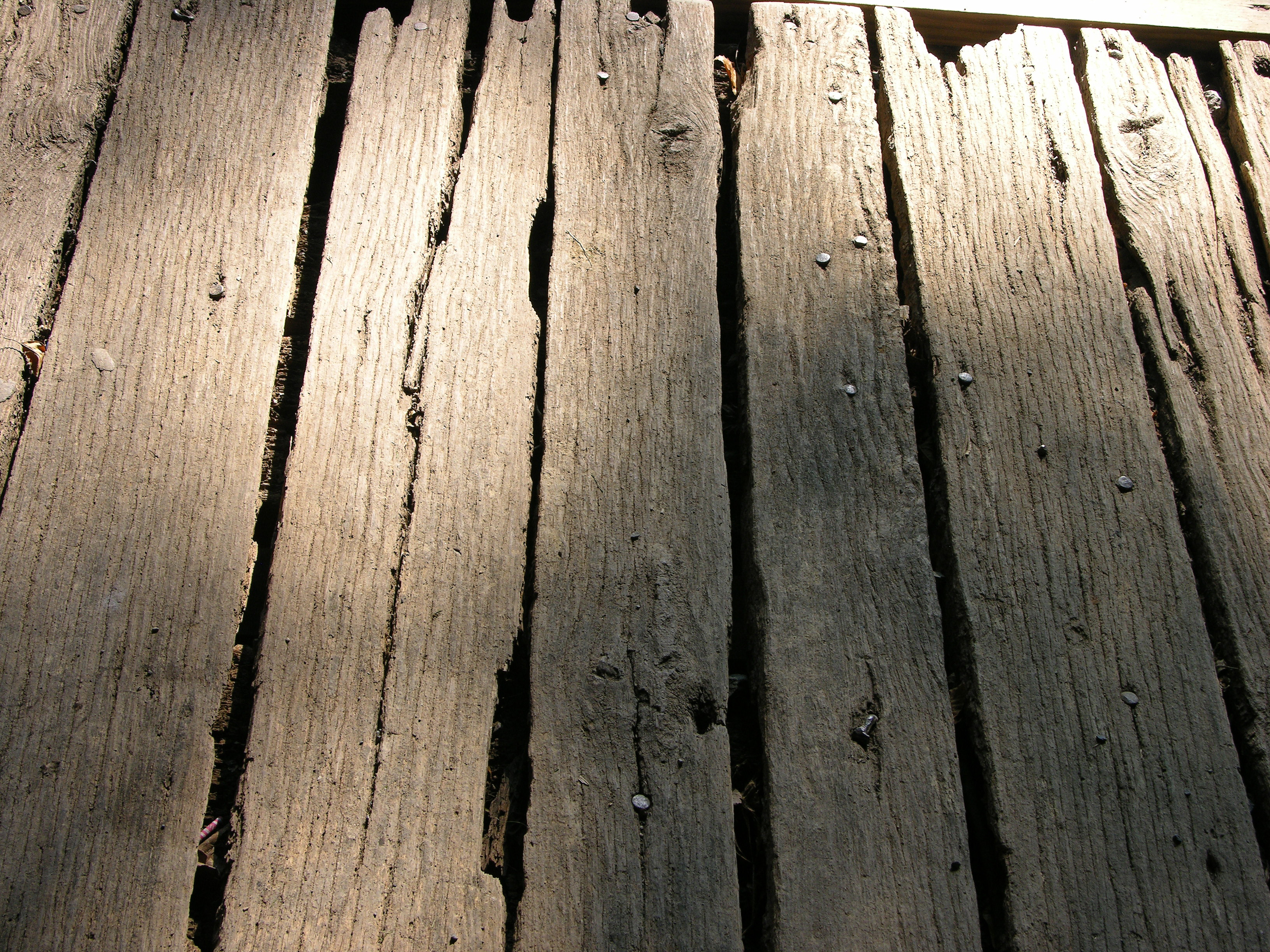
The bridge's floor boards

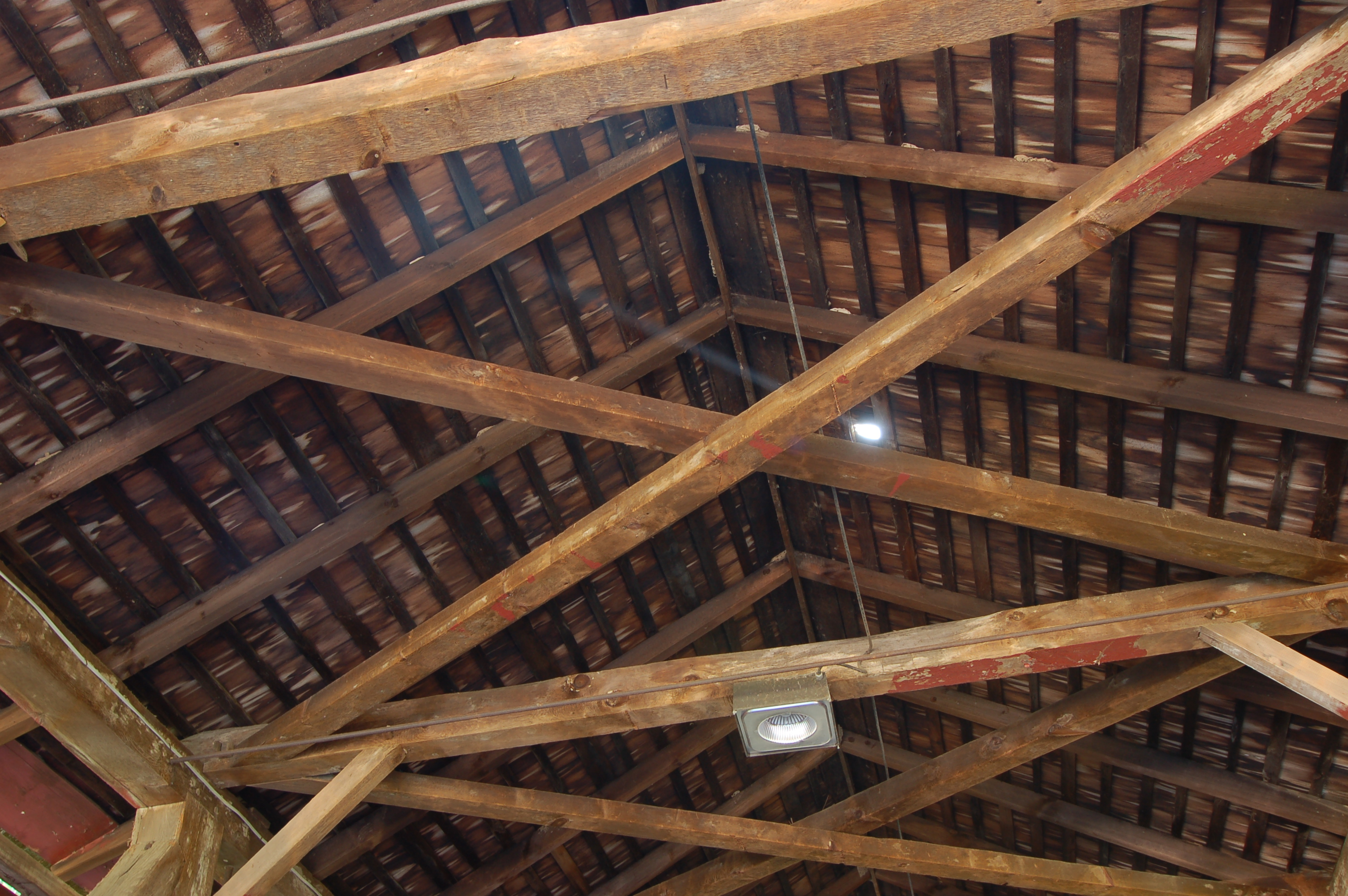
The bridge's ceiling

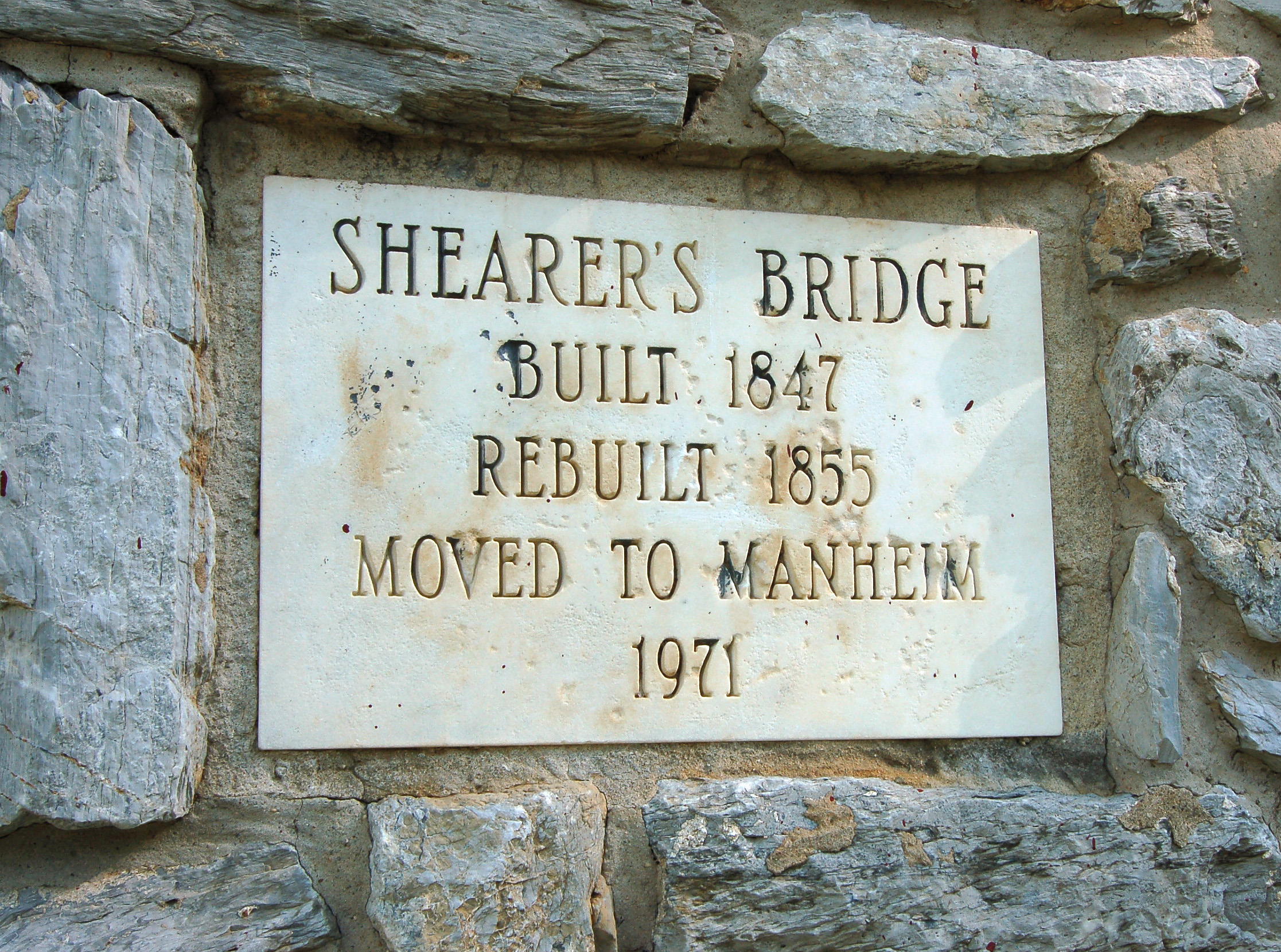
History plaque on the bridge

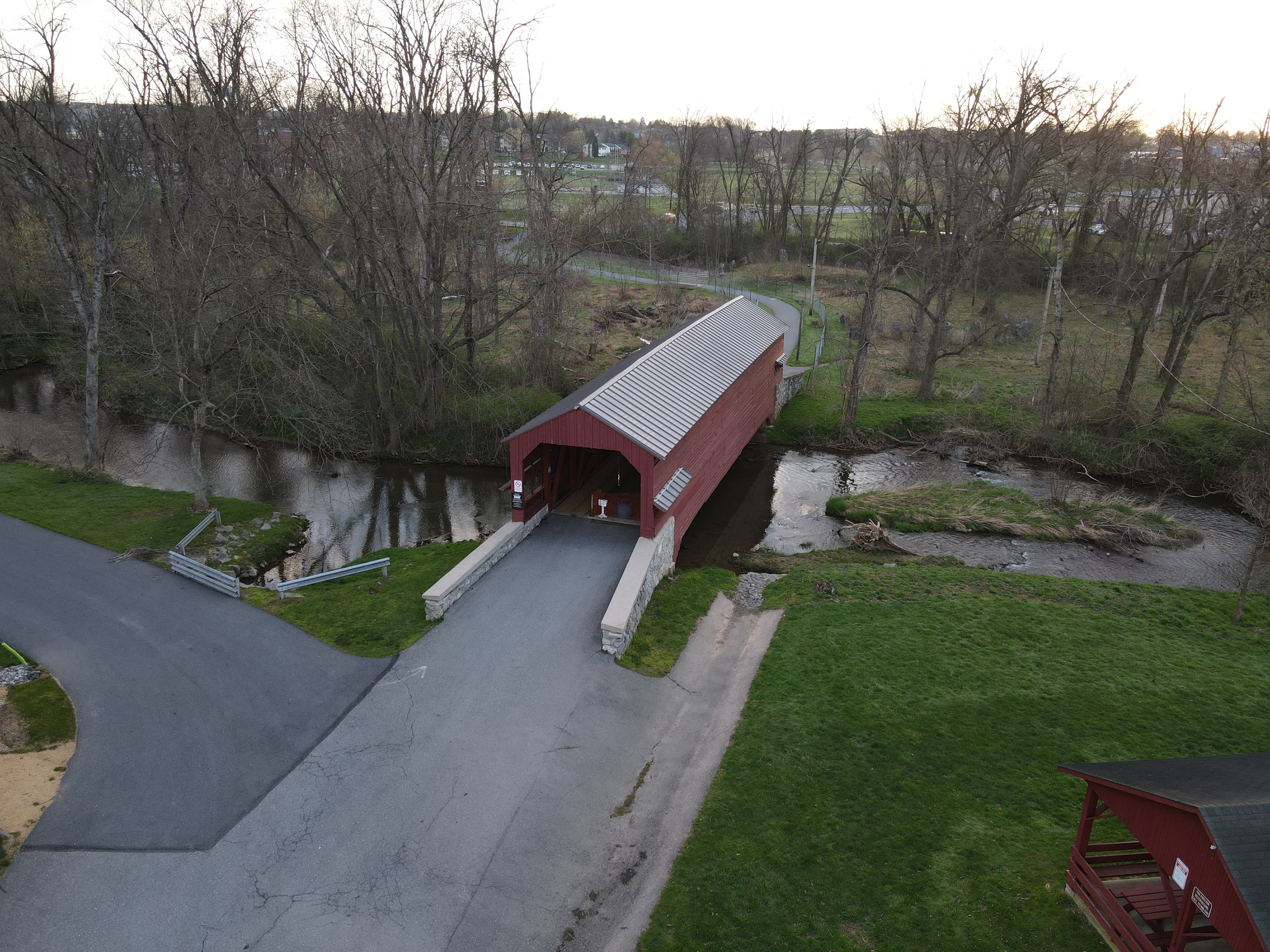
Approach view from the air

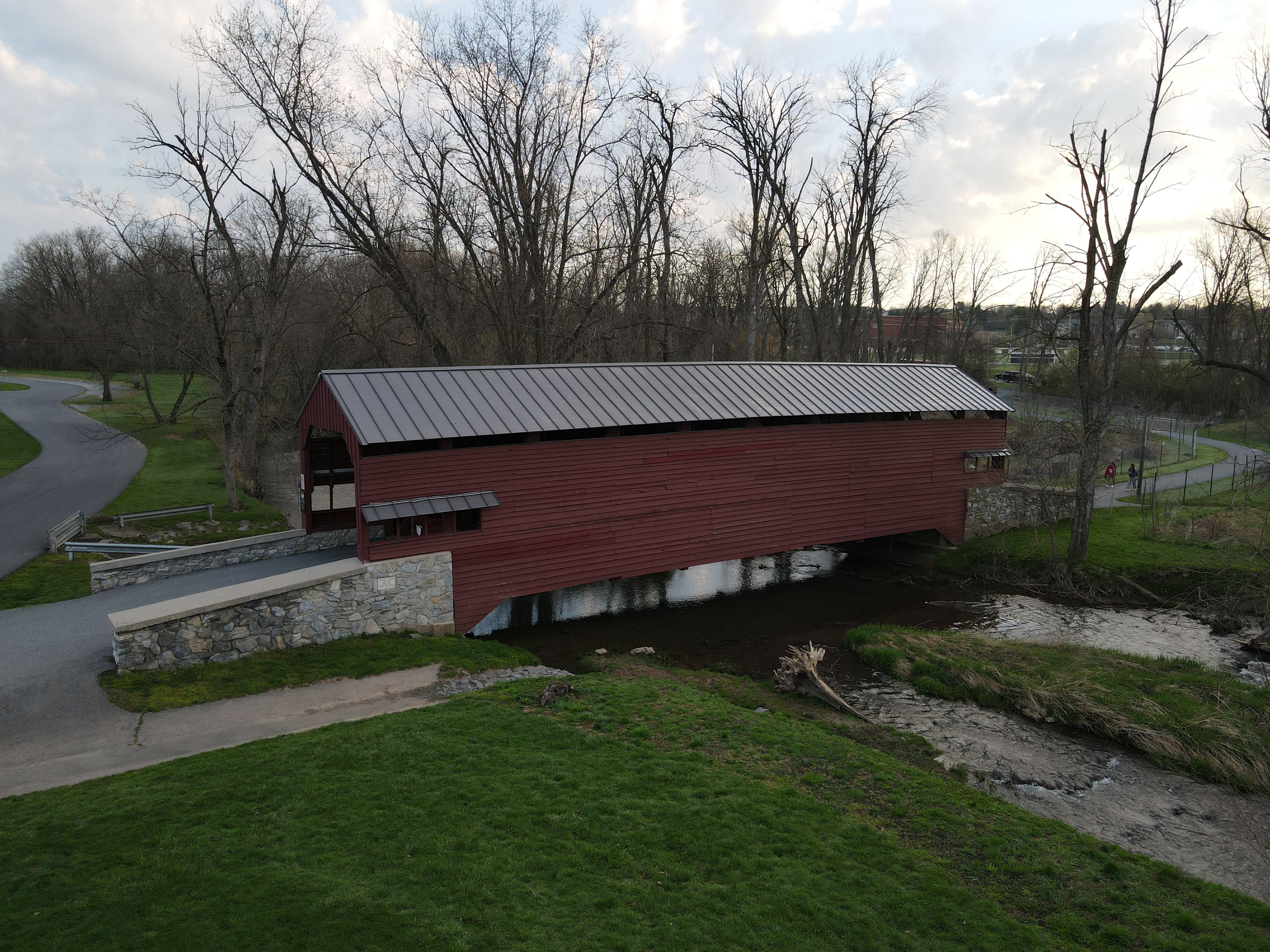
Side view from the air

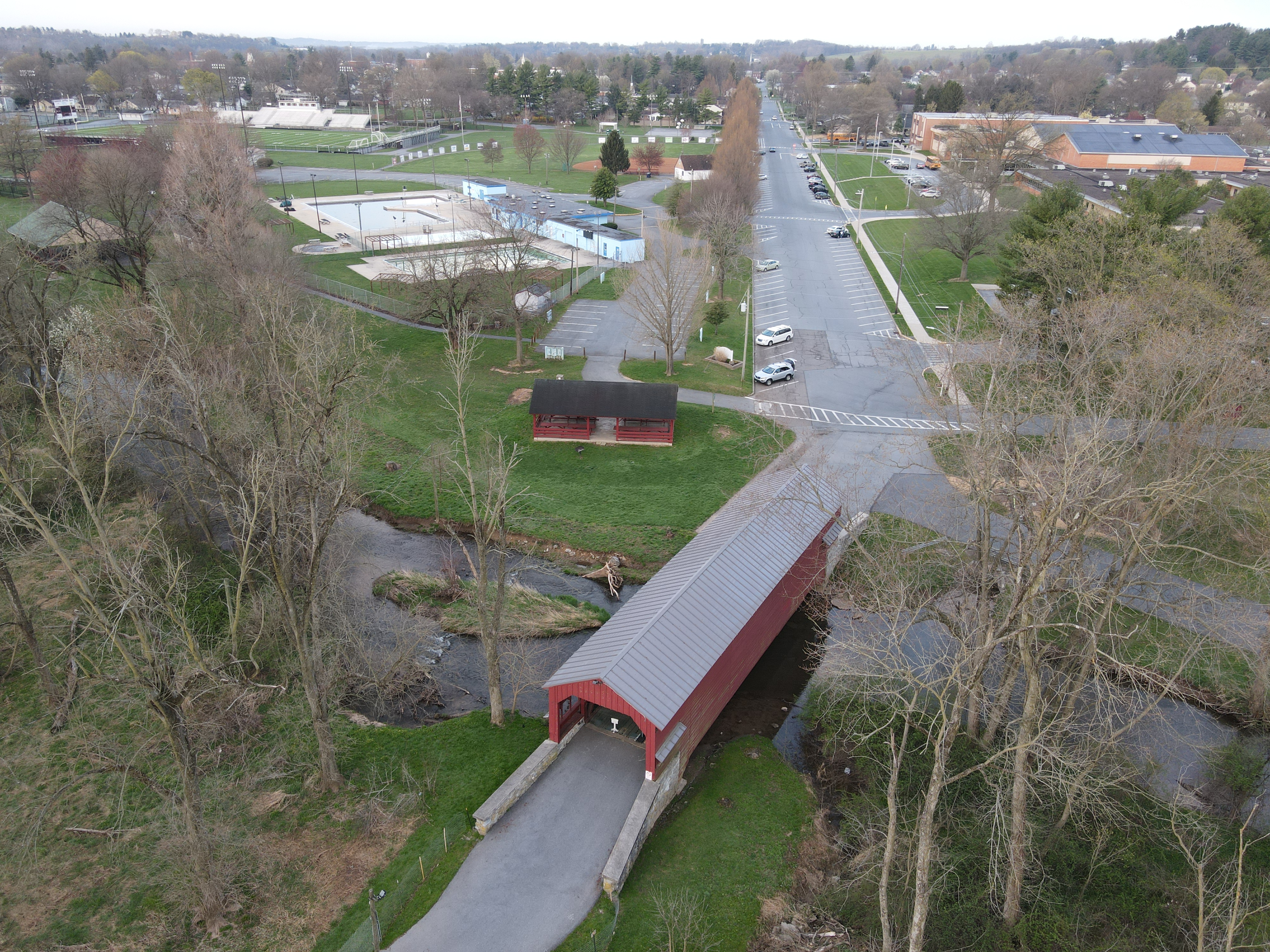
View from the air towards Manheim Central High School

== See also ==
- Burr arch truss
- List of Lancaster County covered bridges
