= Keller's Mill Covered Bridge =

Covered bridge in Pennsylvania, US

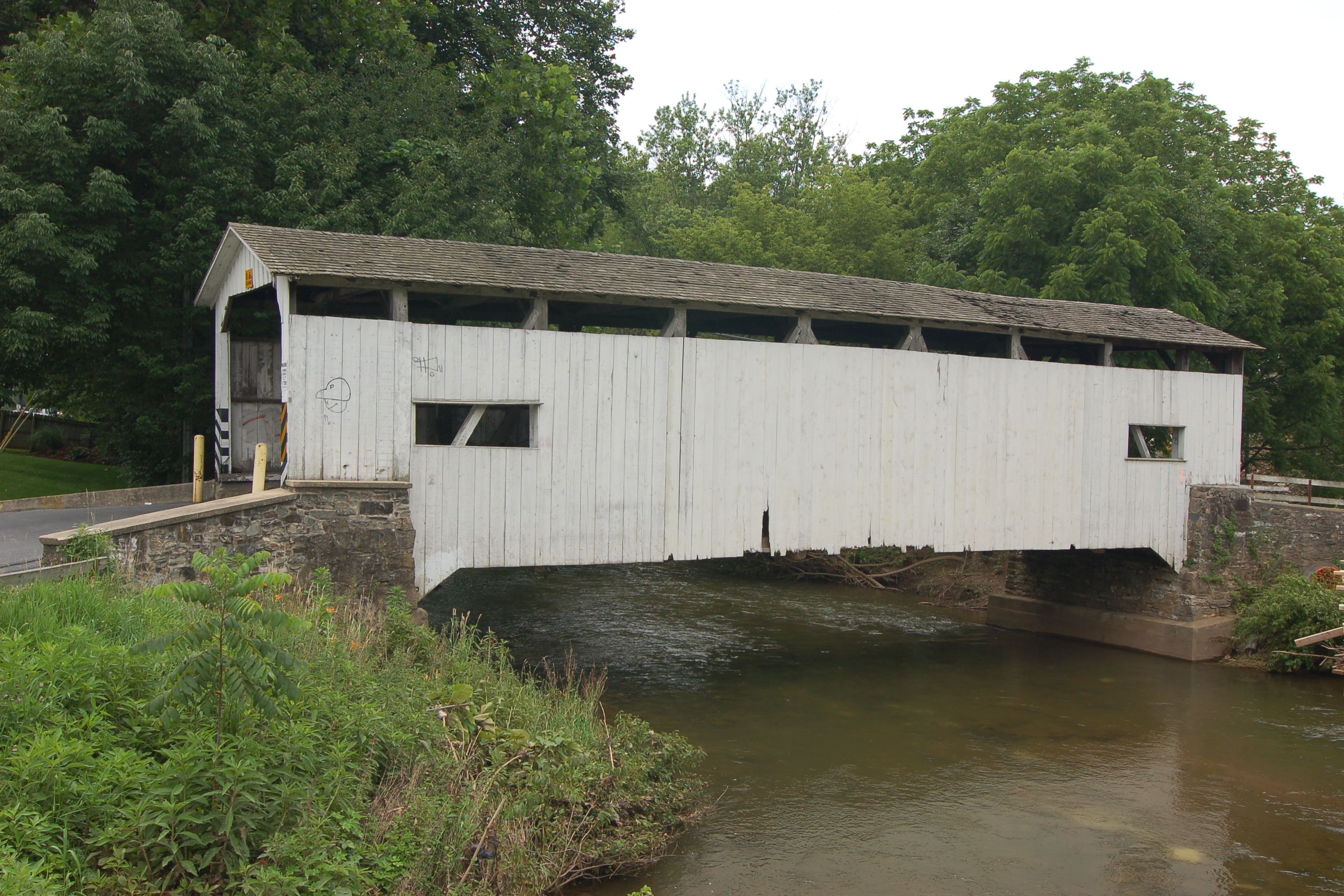
- On Rettew Mill Road in July 2006, before the bridge was disassembled and moved
- Coordinates: 40°9′51″N 76°13′57″W
- Carries: Middle Creek Road (TR 660)
- Crosses: Cocalico Creek
- Locale: Lancaster, Pennsylvania, United States
- Official name: Cocalico No. 5 Bridge
- Other name: Guy Bard's
- Maintained by: Lancaster County
- WGCB #: 38-36-13

Characteristics
- Total length: 74 ft (23 m)
- Width: 15 ft (4.6 m)

History
- Constructed by: Elias McMellen
- Built: 1873
- Keller's Mill Covered Bridge
- U.S. National Register of Historic Places
- MPS: Covered Bridges of Lancaster County TR
- NRHP reference No.: 80003518
- Added to NRHP: December 10, 1980

Location
- Interactive map of Keller's Mill Covered Bridge

The Keller's Mill Covered Bridge is a covered bridge that spans Cocalico Creek in Ephrata Township, Lancaster County in the US state of Pennsylvania. A county-owned and maintained bridge, its official designation is the Cocalico No. 5 Bridge. It is also sometimes known as the Guy Bard Covered Bridge (after a local jurist) and Rettew's Covered Bridge (after the person for whom Rettew's Road is named).

Due to heavy road traffic on the aging one-lane bridge, construction on a new steel and concrete bridge to bypass the covered bridge took place in the summer of 2006. According to Ephrata Township supervisor Clark Stauffer, the bridge has been disassembled and will be reassembled a few miles downstream to replace an existing one-lane Middle Creek Road bridge. It was located at 40°10′11.4″N 76°12′16.8″W (40.16983, −76.20467) before being disassembled.

== History ==
Keller's Mill Covered Bridge is white not red. It was originally built by Elias McMellen in 1873 at a cost of US$2,075. After being swept away in flooding, the bridge was rebuilt in 1891, again by McMellen. It remained in place until it was disassembled and moved in 2006. The bridge was reconstructed in 2009 and reopened on Middle Creek Road in December 2010.

== Design ==
Keller's Mill Covered Bridge has a single span, wooden, double Burr arch trusses design with the addition of steel hanger rods. The deck is made from oak planks. The bridge is the only all white bridge in the county, not red. In fact, just about all covered bridges were whitewashed both inside and out. the only bridge to have survived the transition from whitewashing to the red color commonly used in barns throughout the county. The bridge is not painted on the inside.

- Length: 62 feet (19 m) span and 74 feet (23 m) total length
- Width: 13 feet 2 inches (4.01 m) clear deck and 15 feet (4.6 m) total width
- Overhead clearance: 11 feet (3.4 m)
- Underclearance: 9 feet 8 inches (2.95 m)

Rebuilt in 2010

- Length: 72 feet (22 m) span and 74 feet (23 m) total length
- Width: 13.1 feet 2 inches (4.04 m) clear deck and 16 feet (4.9 m) total width
- Overhead clearance: 9 feet 6 inches (2.90 m)
- Underclearance: 13 feet 8 inches (4.17 m)

== See also ==
- List of covered bridges in Lancaster County, Pennsylvania
- National Register of Historic Places listings in Lancaster County, Pennsylvania
