= Bucher's Mill Covered Bridge =

Covered bridge in Pennsylvania, US

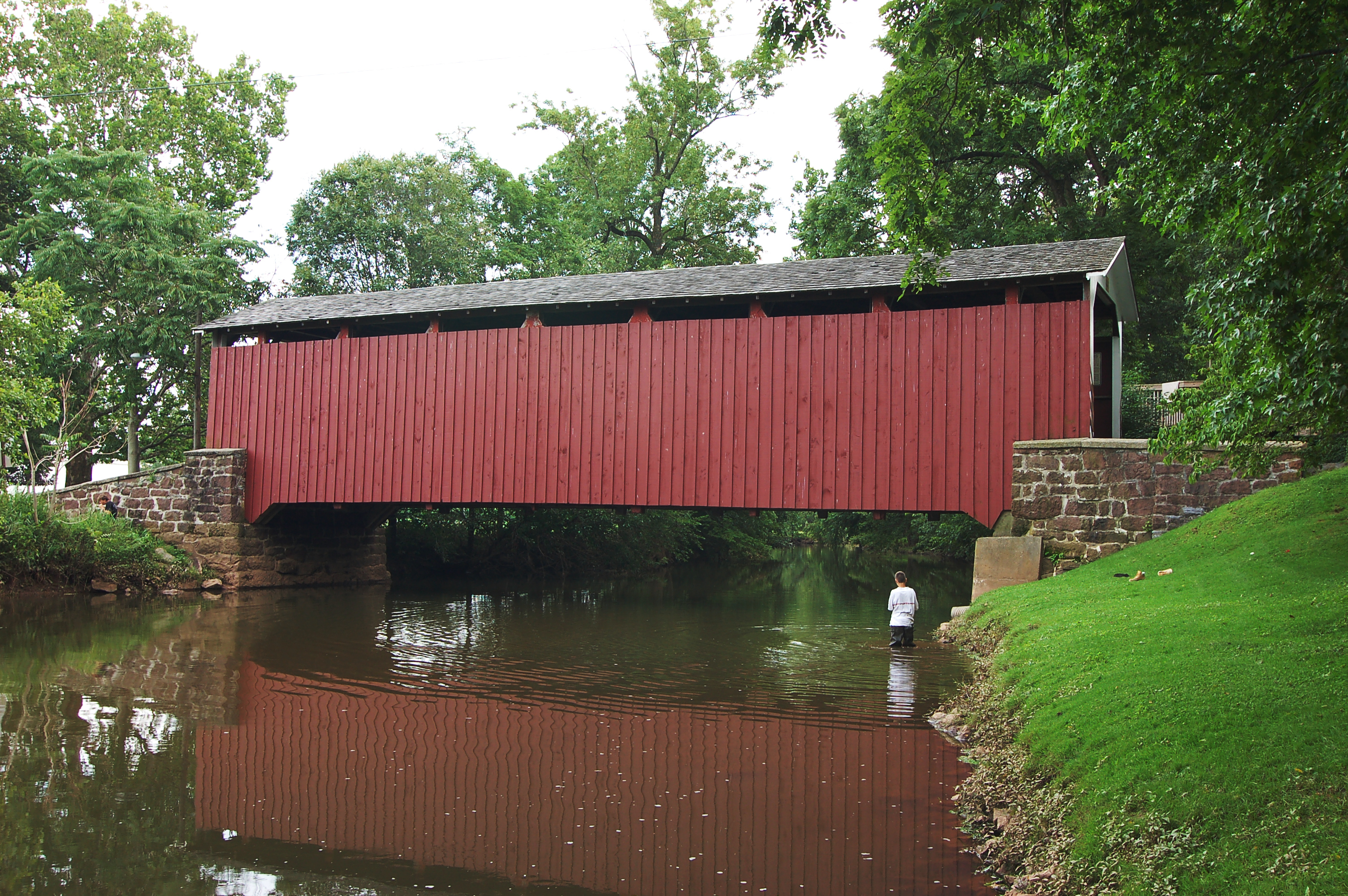
- Coordinates: 40°12′29″N 76°8′5″W
- Carries: T 955
- Crosses: Cocalico Creek
- Locale: Lancaster, Pennsylvania, United States
- Official name: Cocalico #2 Bridge
- Other name: Butcher's Mill
- Maintained by: Lancaster County
- NBI Number: 367210085505020

Characteristics
- Total length: 64 ft (20 m)
- Width: 15 ft (4.6 m)
- Height: 10.5 ft (3.2 m)
- Load limit: 4 short tons (3.6 t)

History
- Constructed by: Elias McMellen
- Built: 1891
- Bucher's Mill Covered Bridge
- U.S. National Register of Historic Places
- MPS: Covered Bridges of Lancaster County TR
- NRHP reference No.: 80003514
- Added to NRHP: December 11, 1980

Location
- Interactive map of Bucher's Mill Covered Bridge

The Bucher's Mill Covered Bridge or Butcher's Mill Covered Bridge is a covered bridge that spans Cocalico Creek in Lancaster County, Pennsylvania, United States. After the Landis Mill Covered Bridge, it is the second shortest covered bridge in the county. A county-owned and maintained bridge, its official designation is the Cocalico #2 Bridge.

The bridge has a single span, wooden, double Burr arch trusses design with the addition of steel hanger rods. The deck is made from oak planks. It is painted red, the traditional color of Lancaster County covered bridges, on both the inside and outside. Both approaches to the bridge are painted in the traditional white color.

The bridge's WGCB Number is 38-36-12. In 1980 it was added to the National Register of Historic Places as structure number 80003514. It is located at 40°12′28.2″N 76°8′4.8″W (40.20783, -76.134667) to the northeast of Ephrata, Pennsylvania off Pennsylvania Route 272 on Cocalico Creek Road.

== History ==
The Bucher's Mill Covered Bridge was built in 1891^{Note:} by Elias McMellen, using single span, wooden, double Burr arch truss construction, at a cost of $1167. A year later, in 1892, the bridge was damaged heavily in a flood and was rebuilt by McMellen for $1025. At only 64 feet long, it is one of the shortest covered bridges in Lancaster County, Pennsylvania.

== Gallery ==
View of bridge from the road

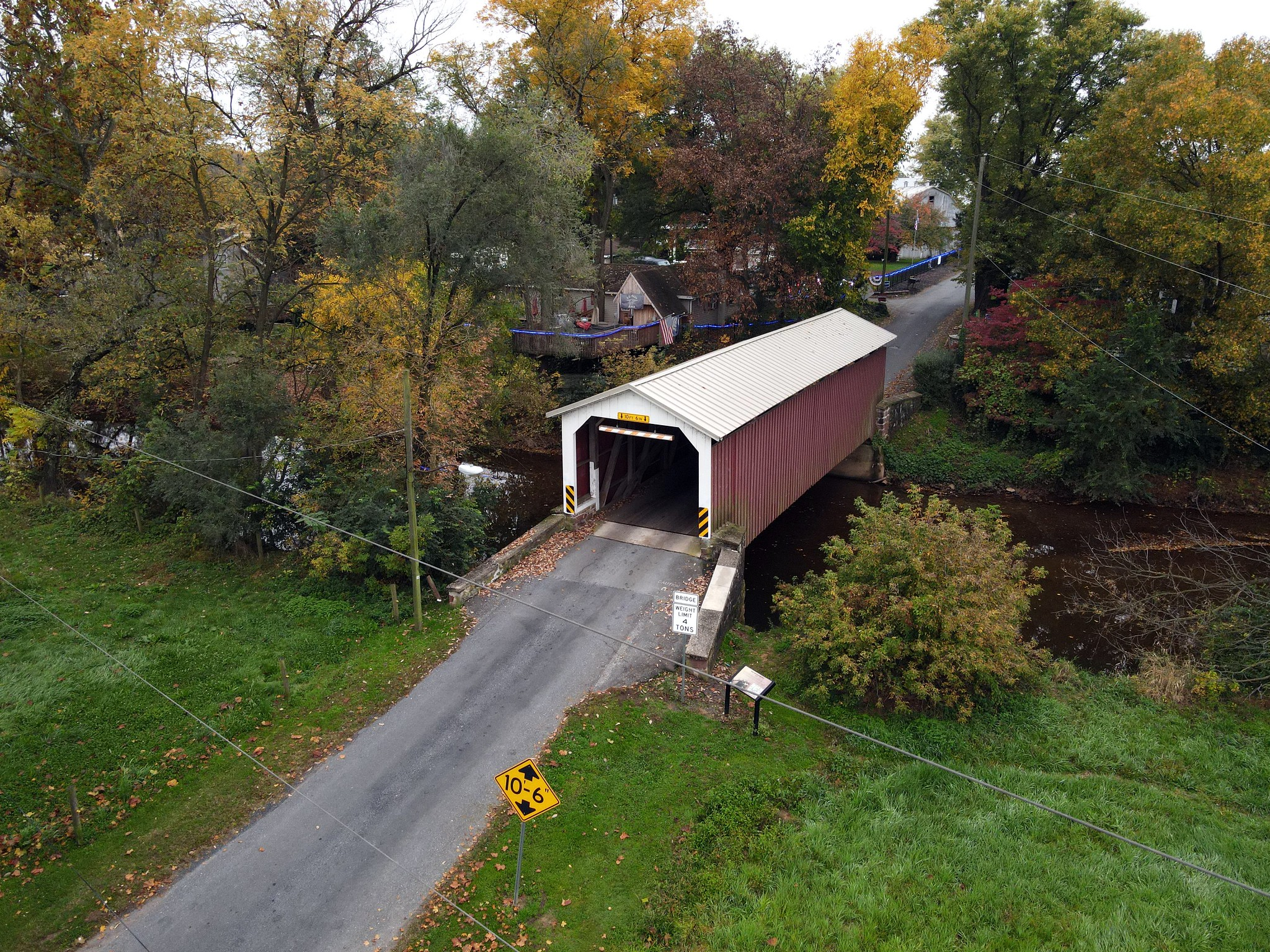
View of bridge from the air

== See also ==
- List of bridges on the National Register of Historic Places in Pennsylvania
- List of covered bridges in Lancaster County, Pennsylvania
- National Register of Historic Places listings in Lancaster County, Pennsylvania
