= Bellbank Bridge =

Bellbank Covered Bridge
- Coordinates: 39.8466°N 76.0204°W
- Locale: Lancaster County, Pennsylvania, United States

Characteristics
- Total length: 112 feet (34.1 m)

History
- Constructed by: Robert Russell
- Construction start: 1850

The Bellbank Covered Bridge was a covered bridge that spanned the Octoraro Creek on the border between Colerain Township, Lancaster County and Upper Oxford Township, Chester County in Pennsylvania. The 112 ft (34 m) bridge was located on Street Road near Pennsylvania Route 472. It was burnt and destroyed by an arsonist on March 19, 1979. The covered bridge was also referred to as Bridge #11 by Chester County before it was replaced with the current steel beam bridge.

== History ==
The Bellbank Covered Bridge was built in 1850 over the Octoraro Creek by Robert Russell (who also rebuilt the Pine Grove Covered Bridge in 1846). It was named after Revolutionary War Colonel James Patterson Bell, who had his home, gristmill, and sawmill located in the 1,200-acre (4.9 km^{2}) plot of land where the bridge was built. In June 1860 the bridge caught on fire after being struck by lightning. Russell received a contract to rebuild the bridge at a cost of $1,739.

Sometime in the 1960s the bridge was scheduled to be destroyed, but was instead rehabilitated. After it was destroyed by fire on March 19, 1979, the bridge, which was previously owned by Chester County, was finally replaced by an open steel-beam bridge after a failed petition to PennDOT by the community to rebuild it as a covered bridge. The fire was ruled as arson when a blackened gas can was found in the center of the burnt-out bridge. As of 2006, there is a movement to replace the current bridge with a replica of the original covered bridge.
