= Rapho =

Rapho may refer to:

- Rapho (agency), a French photo agency
- Rapho Township, Pennsylvania, United States

== See also ==
- Raphoe, a town in County Donegal, Ireland
