= Hempfield High School =

Coordinates: 40.092°N 76.414°W

Location
- 210 Stanley Ave; Landisville, Lancaster County, Pennsylvania 17538; United States

Information
- School type: Public, secondary
- School district: Hempfield School District
- Staff: 137.56 (FTE)
- Faculty: ~130
- Grades: 9 - 12
- Enrollment: 2,254 (2023-2024)
- Student to teacher ratio: 16.39
- Campus: Suburban
- Colors: Red and black
- Mascot: Hempfield Black Knight
- Rival: Manheim Township High School
- Website: https://hhs.hempfieldsd.org/

Hempfield High School is a public senior high school located in Salunga-Landisville, Pennsylvania, United States. It serves both East and West Hempfield townships and serves as the only high school for Hempfield School District. It was established in 1955.

== Demographics ==
- Grades: 9-12
- County: Lancaster
- Total students: 2481
- 53.09% male / 48.3% female
- Teachers: 139

== Academics ==
Hempfield High School continually shows test results above the state average on the PSSA tests and the SAT. The school has a 95% graduation rate, with almost 82% of Hempfield graduates continuing to post-secondary education.

From 2005-2007, thirteen students were honored as National Merit Finalists. Finally, Hempfield students have consistently excelled in the Pennsylvania Math League. In 1999 and 2000, and from 2002-2005, the Math Team placed first in their region, and in 2001, 2006, and 2008, they placed first in the league.

Hempfield offers a number of Advanced Placement courses, including classes in Biology, Calculus, Chemistry, Physics, Computer Science, Economics, Environmental Science, English, French, German, Spanish Literature, Art, Music Theory, Physics, Statistics, US History, Human Geography and US Government and Politics. AP exams for college credit are also offered in all of these areas. Honor-weighted courses in the Humanities are offered; however, no AP exam accompanies them.

== Performing arts and music ==
=== Theater ===
Hempfield High School is known for its extensive theater program and its annual dance theatre production. This is a completely original show which features over 100 students. Dance Theatre celebrated its 25th anniversary in 2008. A spring musical is also performed annually.

The 1,300-seat Performing Arts Center was designed by the Ray Group Inc., a Lancaster-based architecture firm that specializes in schools and universities. The PAC opened in the fall of 1995 and was one of the most expensive high school stages in Pennsylvania at the time. Local dance companies and performance groups often rent it out.

=== Music ===
The Hempfield Black Knight Marching Band consists of over 100 members. The Symphonic Band is for grades 10-12. The Concert Band is a 50+ performance group which accepts all levels of musicians from all grades, and is designed for 9th graders, to adapt them to the more challenging material and style that is played in this band. The 2012–2013 band was selected to perform at the PMEA All-State conference. The Jazz Band hosts a variety of shows during the year, and the Jazz Lab Band performs with the Jazz Band during the spring jazz concert. All of the bands at Hempfield are supervised by the department chair of music, Matt Ceresini.

Hempfield is also the home to several choral groups: Hempfield Singers, Bel Cantos, Concert Choir, and Chamber Singers. All are under the direction of Alejandro Ramos. Hempfield Singers is a high level choir which is open by audition. Bel Cantos is an all female-choir, also selected through audition. This group is not currently running, however. Concert Choir is a larger group that is open to any student. The Hempfield Chamber Singers is an elite group which includes a small number of singers. The 2012-2013 group also performed at the state conference. The Chamber Singers perform the national anthem at many of Hempfield's home basketball games.

The Hempfield orchestras include Symphony Strings, an orchestra tailored to advanced musicians; and Concert Strings, a performing orchestra designed for underclassmen.

All orchestras, bands and choirs perform at either the holiday concert, the winter concert or a spring concert. Some groups have shows outside of the Hempfield music department, which change every year.

== Athletics ==
Hempfield competes in the Lancaster-Lebanon League as part of the Pennsylvania Interscholastic Athletic Association, except for:

- Ice hockey, governed by USA Hockey and compete in the Central Pennsylvania Interscholastic Hockey League (CPIHL)
- Rugby, which compete in the Eastern Pennsylvania Rugby Union (EPRU)

=== Sports ===
- Baseball

The Hempfield Black Knight Baseball team is currently coached by Austin Hinkle. Historical highlights and championships:

Section One: 1983, 1993, 1995, 1996, 1997, 2000, 2001, 2003, 2005, 2012, 2013, 2015, 2016

Lancaster-Lebanon: 1974, 1996, 1997, 1998, 1999, 2004, 2005, 2008, 2014

District 3: 2004, 2015

- Basketball (m/w)
- Bowling
- Cheerleading
- Field hockey
- Football
- Golf
- Ice hockey (not a PIAA sport)
- Lacrosse (m/w)
- Rugby (m/w; not a PIAA sport)
- Soccer (m/w)
- Softball
- Swimming and diving
- Tennis (m/w)
- Track and field/cross country
- Volleyball (m/w)
- Wrestling

=== Facilities ===
- Georgelis Law Firm Stadium
  - Synthetic turf field used for football, soccer, and lacrosse
  - Also serves as the home field for Lancaster Inferno minor league soccer team

== Notable alumni ==
- Tom Herr (1974), former MLB All-Star second baseman
- Tristan Egolf (1989), novelist
- Marc Fusco (1989), film director
- Gretchen Egolf (1991), actress
- Kyle Salyards (1998), swimmer, Olympian
- Aaron Herr (2000), former MiLB player
- John Murray (2005), hockey goaltender who played professionally in Poland
- Zach Miller (2007), ultramarathoner
- Travis Worra (2011), soccer player who played in the MLS
- Drew Skundrich (2014), soccer player who plays in the MLS
- Action Andretti (2016), professional wrestler for AEW
- David Martin-Robinson (2018), tight end for the Tennessee Titans
