= Wu Shaoping =

Chinese human rights activist

Wu Shaoping (Chinese: 吴绍平) is a Chinese human rights lawyer based in the United States.

== Career ==
Originally a commercial lawyer, Wu became involved with cases regarding political dissidents and minorities. In December 2019, Wu was among approximately 20 lawyers and activists who attended a meeting in Xiamen. Following the meeting, several of the attendees were detained by Chinese authorities.

Wu fled to the United States on a tourist visa in 2019, and subsequently applied for asylum. He and his family live in Mountville, Pennsylvania.

In July 2026, Wu was detained by Immigration and Customs Enforcement in Pennsylvania, where he had been working as a contract driver for Amazon.

Wu was subsequently released with an ankle monitor.
