= David Martin-Robinson =

American football player (born 1999)

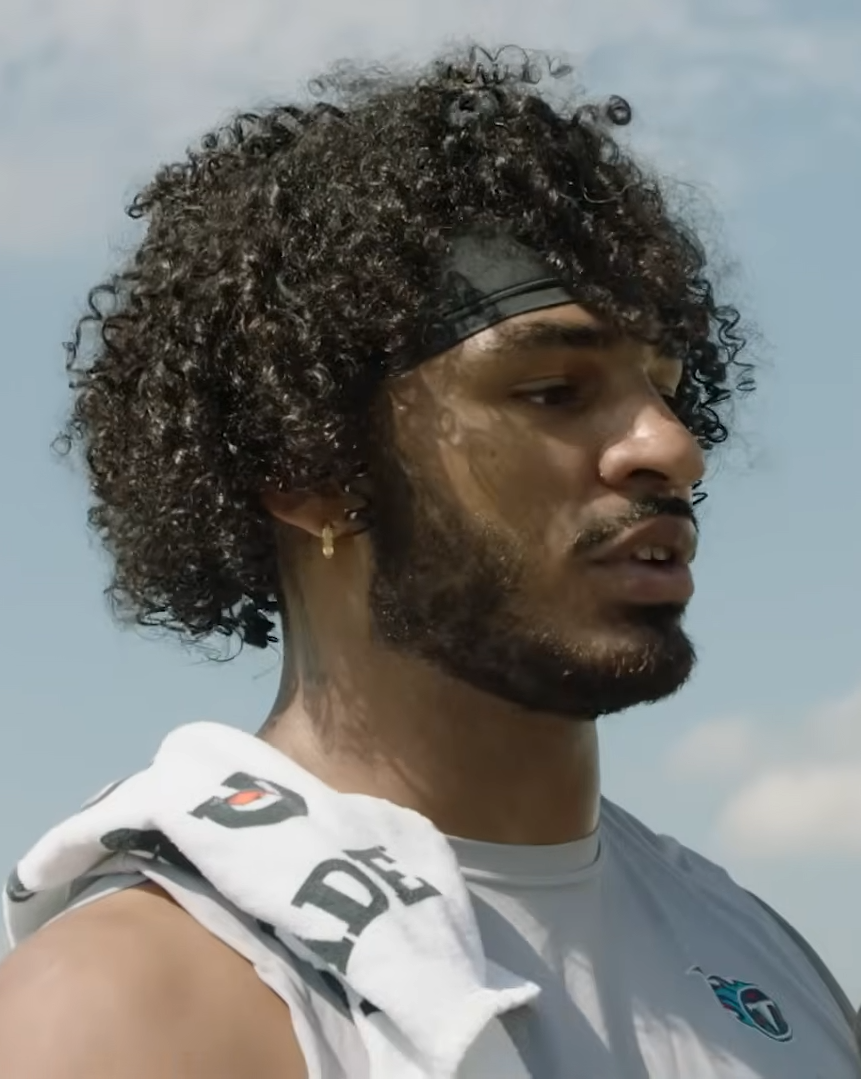
- Martin-Robinson with the Tennessee Titans in 2025

No. 88 – Tennessee Titans
- Position: Tight end
- Roster status: Active

Personal information
- Born: December 26, 1999 (age 26); Lancaster, Pennsylvania, U.S.
- Listed height: 6 ft 3 in (1.91 m)
- Listed weight: 247 lb (112 kg)

Career information
- High school: Hempfield (Hempfield, Pennsylvania)
- College: Temple (2018–2023)
- NFL draft: 2024: undrafted

Career history
- Tennessee Titans (2024–present)

Awards and highlights
- Second team All-AAC (2023)

Career NFL statistics as of 2025
- Receptions: 5
- Receiving yards: 36
- Touchdowns: 1
- Stats at Pro Football Reference

David Michael Martin-Robinson (born December 26, 1999) is an American professional football tight end for the Tennessee Titans of the National Football League (NFL). He played college football for the Temple Owls and was signed by the Titans as an undrafted free agent in 2024.

== Early life ==
Martin-Robinson was born on December 26, 1999, in Lancaster, Pennsylvania. He attended Hempfield High School where he played wide receiver, running back, linebacker, safety and return specialist. He lettered all four years in three sports – football, basketball and track. In football, he was a two-time all-conference selection and recorded 11 touchdowns as a senior with 53 tackles and two interceptions; in his career at Hempfield, he ended with 26 touchdowns and 134 total tackles. He graduated from Hempfield in 2018 and committed to play college football for the Temple Owls.

== College career ==
Martin-Robinson became a tight end at Temple. He redshirted as a freshman in 2018, seeing little playing time, although he was one of only five true freshmen to play for the Owls that year. He had five catches for 64 yards in the 2019 season while playing in 13 games, mainly as a backup. He caught 11 passes for 147 yards in four games during the 2020 season. He missed two months of the 2021 season due to injury, only catching four passes for 61 yards in five games. The following year, he was named fourth-team All-American Athletic Conference (AAC) by Phil Steele after having 33 receptions for 366 yards and two touchdowns. Martin-Robinson returned for a final season in 2023, as all players were given an extra year of eligibility due to the COVID-19 pandemic. He had a career-best season in 2023, being named second-team All-AAC while totaling 40 receptions for 537 yards and four touchdowns. In his collegiate career, he recorded 94 catches for 1,177 yards and six touchdowns, being one of three tight ends in school history with over 1,000 receiving yards.

== Professional career ==
Pre-draft measurables
Height	Weight	Arm length	Hand span	Wingspan	40-yard dash	10-yard split	20-yard split	20-yard shuttle	Three-cone drill	Vertical jump	Broad jump	Bench press
6 ft 3 5/8 in (1.92 m)	247 lb (112 kg)	32 7/8 in (0.84 m)	9 3/4 in (0.25 m)	6 ft 6 in (1.98 m)	4.68 s	1.54 s	2.73 s	4.08 s	7.08 s	35.5 in (0.90 m)	9 ft 10 in (3.00 m)	15 reps
All values from Pro Day

After going unselected in the 2024 NFL draft, Martin-Robinson signed with the Tennessee Titans as an undrafted free agent. Martin-Robinson was notably among the 53 players to make the Titans' initial Week 1 roster. He appeared in the last five games of the 2024 season, making his professional debut during Week 14's game against the Jacksonville Jaguars. He finished his rookie year with one reception and two tackles on special teams.

Martin-Robinson began the 2025 campaign as one of Tennessee's backup tight ends. In Week 6 against the Las Vegas Raiders, Martin-Robinson scored his first career touchdown on a one-yard reception from Cam Ward.

== NFL career statistics ==
Legend
**Bold**	Career high

=== Regular season ===
Year	Team	Games		Receiving					Tackles			Fumbles			
Year	Team	GP	GS	Rec	Yds	Avg	Lng	TD	Cmb	Solo	Ast	FF	FR	Fum	Lost
2024	TEN	5	2	1	6	6.0	6	0	3	1	2	0	**1**	0	0
2025	TEN	17	4	**4**	**30**	**7.5**	**14**	**1**	**10**	**5**	**5**	0	0	0	0
Career		22	6	5	36	7.2	14	1	13	6	7	0	1	0	0
