= Mastersonville, Pennsylvania =

Unincorporated community in Pennsylvania, US

- Unincorporated community
- Location in Pennsylvania Location in the United States
- Coordinates: 40°11′48″N 76°29′14″W
- Country: United States
- State: Pennsylvania
- County: Lancaster
- Township: Rapho
- Time zone: UTC-5 (Eastern (EST))
  - Summer (DST): UTC-4 (EDT)

Mastersonville is an unincorporated community located in Rapho Township in Lancaster County, Pennsylvania, United States. It was founded by Thomas Masterson in the early 1820s.

== History ==
Thomas Masterson emigrated from County Cavan, Ireland around 1823 and built a stone house north of the village. Later he became postmaster. Thomas Jr. became manager at the Hopewell Forges for the Coleman Ironworks.

At one time, Mastersonville was one of the most thriving villages in the township. Thomas Sr.'s son Joseph constructed additional brick houses. Joseph and Benjamin Masterson established a store in a large brick building. Joseph's son, John S. Masterson succeeded his father in the business. He also was postmaster and a Justice of the Peace.

The Exchange Hotel was built by Samuel R. Zug. Zug was one of the founders of Chiques Church of the Brethren and instrumental in the founding of Elizabethtown College. A conscientious objector during the Civil War, as were a number of area farmers, he was later a Justice of the Peace. Zug and Joseph Masterson were at one time partners in land speculation.

Around 1876, having graduated from the University of Pennsylvania, William B. Thome, son of Dr. Joseph S. Thome of Lawn, established a medical practice in Mastersonville, where he remained for ten years before relocating to Milton Grove.

== Mastersonville Fire Department ==
The Mastersonville volunteers Fire Department covers an area of about fifty square miles, of mostly farmland and single-family dwellings.
