= West Hempfield Township, Pennsylvania =

Township in Pennsylvania, US

Coordinates: 40°03′00″N 76°30′59″W

- Township
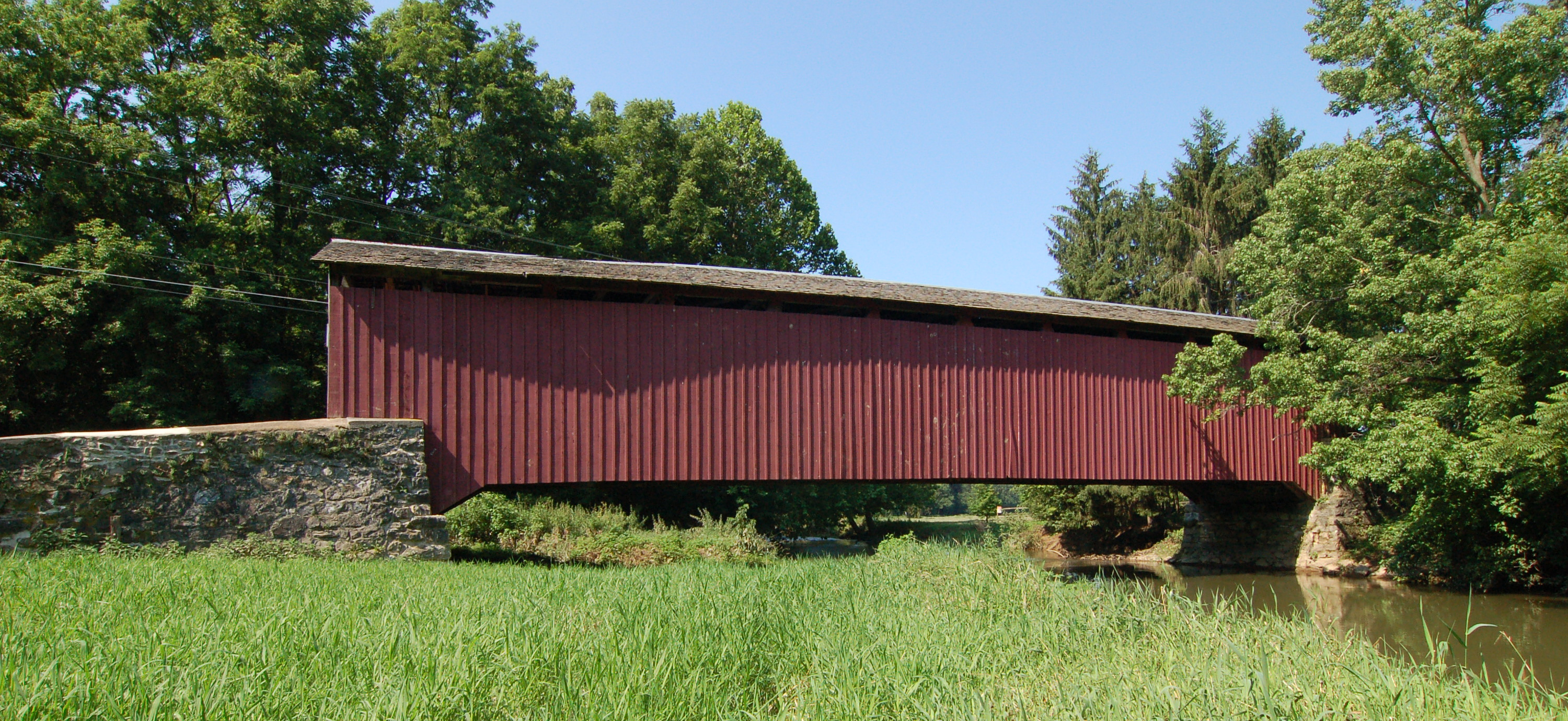
- Forry's Mill Covered Bridge in West Hempfield Township

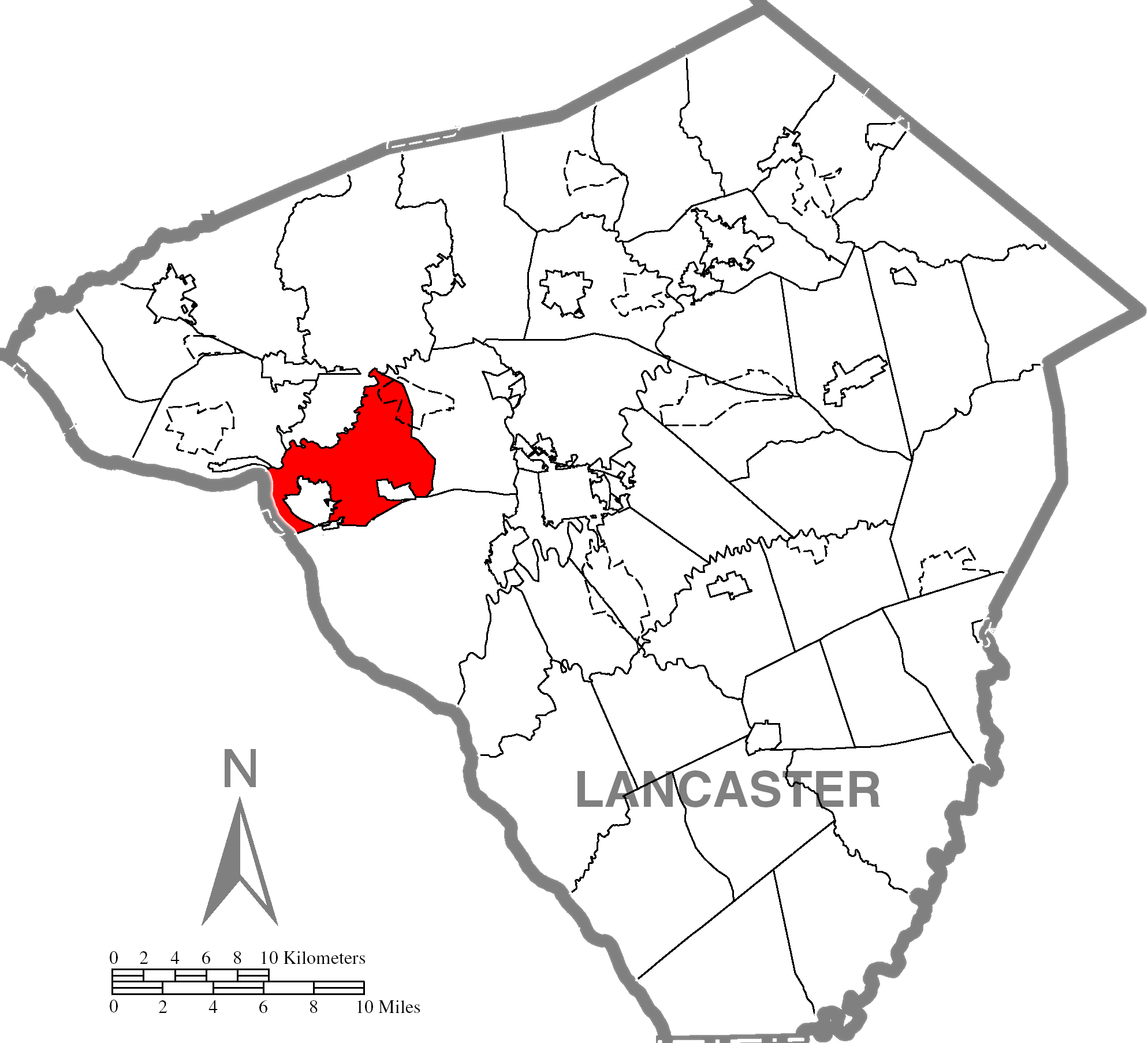
- Map of Lancaster County, Pennsylvania highlighting West Hempfield Township

- Map of Lancaster County, Pennsylvania
- Country: United States
- State: Pennsylvania
- County: Lancaster
- Settled: 1718
- Incorporated: 1818

Government
  - Type: Board of Supervisors

Area
  - Total: 21.03 sq mi (54.47 km^{2})
  - Land: 18.46 sq mi (47.80 km^{2})
  - Water: 2.58 sq mi (6.67 km^{2})

Population (2020)
  - Total: 17,047 ▲
  - Estimate (2021): 17,182
  - Density: 893.4/sq mi (344.95/km^{2})
- Time zone: UTC-5 (Eastern (EST))
  - Summer (DST): UTC-4 (EDT)
- FIPS code: 42-071-83152
- Website: www.westhempfield.org

West Hempfield Township is a township in west central Lancaster County, Pennsylvania, United States. The population was 17,061 at the 2020 census.

== History ==
The Chickies Historic District, Forry's Mill Covered Bridge, and Siegrist's Mill Covered Bridge are listed on the National Register of Historic Places.

== Geography ==
According to the United States Census Bureau, the township has a total area of 20.9 square miles (54.2 km^{2}), of which 18.8 square miles (48.8 km^{2}) are land and 2.1 square miles (5.4 km^{2}), or 9.89%, are water, consisting mainly of the Susquehanna River. Although the borough of Columbia lies on the Susquehanna, it does not claim any of the river, as its West Hempfield Township's territory.

The township is between the cities of Lancaster and York on U.S. Route 30, allowing for a mix of suburban and farm living. It is bordered by the boroughs of Mountville and of Columbia to the southeast and southwest, respectively. Unincorporated communities in the township include Farmdale, Silver Spring, Oyster Point, Bruckarts Station, Hempfield, Chestnut Hill, Ironville, Cordelia, Kinderhook, Klinesville, and part of Salunga.

== Demographics ==
Historical population
| Census | Pop. | Note | %± |
|---|---|---|---|
| 2000 | 15,128 | | — |
| 2010 | 16,153 | | 6.8% |
| 2020 | 17,047 | | 5.5% |
| 2021 (est.) | 17,182 | | 0.8% |
U.S. Decennial Census

As of the census of 2000, there were 15,128 people, 5,427 households, and 4,319 families living in the township. The population density was 802.3 inhabitants per square mile (309.8/km^{2}). There were 5,542 housing units at an average density of 293.9 units per square mile (113.5 units/km^{2}). The racial makeup of the township was 93.24% White, 1.87% African American, 0.09% Native American, 1.54% Asian, 0.01% Pacific Islander, 2.09% from other races, and 1.16% from two or more races. Hispanic or Latino of any race were 4.56% of the population.

There were 5,427 households, out of which 41.4% had children under the age of 18 living with them, 66.6% were married couples living together, 9.7% had a female householder with no husband present, and 20.4% were non-families. 16.3% of all households were made up of individuals, and 5.3% had someone living alone who was 65 years of age or older. The average household size was 2.75 and the average family size was 3.09.

In the township the population was spread out, with 28.5% under the age of 18, 6.4% from 18 to 24, 32.4% from 25 to 44, 22.4% from 45 to 64, and 10.3% who were 65 years of age or older. The median age was 36 years. For every 100 females, there were 94.5 males. For every 100 females age 18 and over, there were 90.8 males.

The median income for a household in the township was $50,526, and the median income for a family was $54,783. Males had a median income of $40,214 versus $25,311 for females. The per capita income for the township was $21,141. About 3.9% of families and 5.7% of the population were below the poverty line, including 6.8% of those under age 18 and 9.7% of those age 65 or over.
