= Field of Screams (amusement park) =

Simulated attraction in Mountville, Pennsylvania

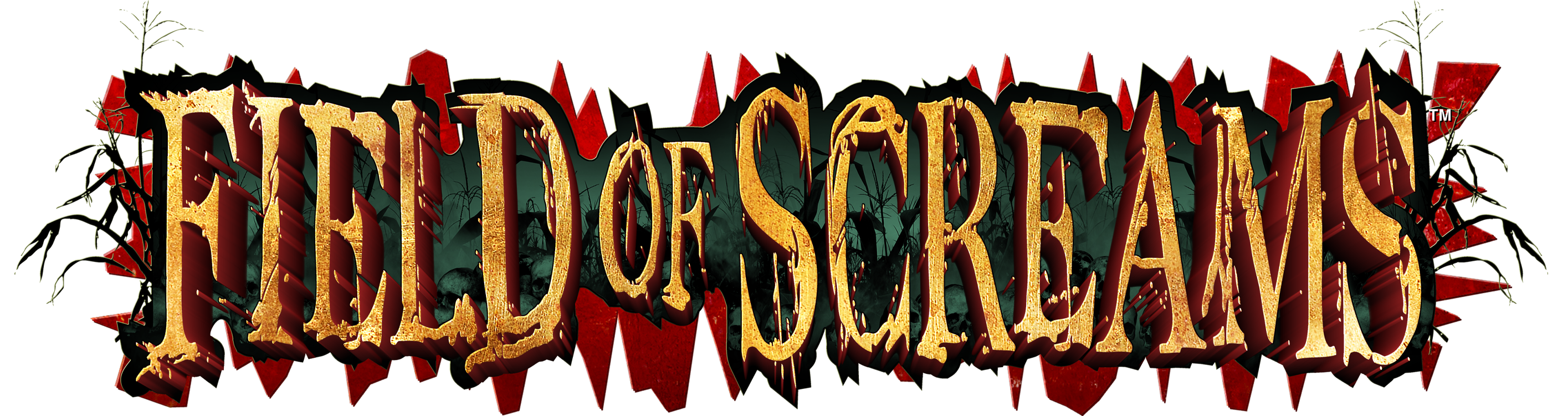
- Interactive map of Field of Screams
- Coordinates: 40.040°N 76.423°W
- Status: Operating
- Owner: Gene and Jim Schopf
- Attendance: 75, 000
- Area: 35 acres (14 ha)

Attractions
- Total: Haunted Hayride (1993), Den of Darkness (1995), Frightmare Asylum (2002), Nocturnal Wasteland (2013).

Field of Screams is an attraction in Mountville, Pennsylvania, United States. They estimate that around 75,000 people visit the attraction annually. Field of Screams is best known for its wide range of horror "theme-park" attractions and branded events such as the Extreme Blackout, Zombie Fun Run, and Friday the 13th.

== History ==
Brothers Gene and Jim Schopf opened the 35-acre attraction in 1993. That year, the first attraction was launched on their family farm.

In 1995, the second Field of Screams attraction, Den of Darkness was opened. It was converted from a farm barn. Also, the Pennsylvania Department of Labor and Industry together with the PA Department of Agriculture checked and approved the location.

In 2002, the team of Field of Screams launched The Frightmare Asylum.

More than a decade later, in 2013 (on Friday, September 13) the 4th Haunt attraction – Nocturnal Wasteland was presented.

== Areas and attractions ==
=== Haunted Hayride ===
The Haunted Hayride was Field of Screams' original attraction, with guests riding a 35-foot wagon for 20 minutes through a cornfield. Throughout the ride, there are different graphic displays and performances. In 2011, Hauntworld magazine considered the ride to be one of the top 5 attractions in America.

=== Den of Darkness ===
The second Field of Scream attraction, Den of Darkness opened in 1995. Den of Darkness is one of America's original Haunted Houses that offers scare scenes and a physically interactive experience with actors and a mechanized interior.

=== Frightmare Asylum ===
In 2002, the Schopf brothers added this attraction, concentrates on more of a hospital-type setting, on horror displays that involve doctors and patients of an insane asylum, such as operations and autopsies.

=== Nocturnal Wasteland ===
The Nocturnal Wasteland is an outdoor trail that opened in 2013. In 2014, a 3.5 million volt Tesla coil was added to the attraction.

=== Corn Cob Acres ===
Gene and Jim Schopf also own and operate Corn Cob Acres, which is a family attraction aimed at children aged between 2 and 12. This includes a range of activities, such as milking a cow, a corn maze and picking pumpkins, amongst others.

=== Escape Games ===
Field of Screams has also housed an array of escape games, in which guests could participate for an additional fee. These were 5-minute versions of an escape room on various topics: 'The Heist', 'Lockdown', 'Captured'.

== Events ==
=== Extreme Blackout ===
Extreme Blackout was added to Field of Screams in 2015, and has continued since as a separate ticketed event. This is the most extreme form of Field of Screams. All four of the haunted attractions at the park are scarier, more intense, and more hands-on. Field of Screams' extreme blackout events occurs once a year in November. Cosmopolitan magazine reported that the event utilised "extreme scare tactics and fear-inducing techniques". There are some claims that this has included guests being 'buried alive'.

=== Christmas ===
In 2019, Field of Screams announced the start of the off-season event starting in December. Its experience is the regular Field of Screams but with a creepy Christmas twist, including photos with a scary Santa, and demented elves.

=== Halfway to Halloween ===
Field of Screams hosts a Halfway to Halloween event. The team of the park demonstrates what has been added and changed so far in preparation for this year's Halloween season. The show includes the "Den of Darkness", "Frightmare Asylum", "Nocturnal Wasteland" attractions with the entertainment area – home to live bands, games, activities for children etc.

=== Friday the 13th with St. Patrick's Day twist ===
In 2020, for the first time in the venue's 28 years of operation, the Lancaster County attraction opened outside its regular fall operating season around Halloween to celebrate two events at the same time. Attractions to a Friday the 13th were decorated with St. Patrick's Day-themed additions.

=== Zombie Fun Run ===
Zombie Fun Run is an event where participants are being chased by zombies throughout the park, which is illuminated with movie-quality scenes. Participants are running through mud, crawling over obstacles, jumping through fire, and more.

== In popular culture ==
Travel Channel featured the attraction in their 2007 TV special, America's Scariest Halloween Attractions II.

In 2022, the attraction was used as the main filming location for the direct-to-video horror film, Where the Scary Things Are. It was released by Lionsgate Home Entertainment on June 28th.

== Awards and recognition ==
In 2015, USA Today ranked the park number 1 in their reader's choice awards.
