= Siegrist's Mill Covered Bridge =

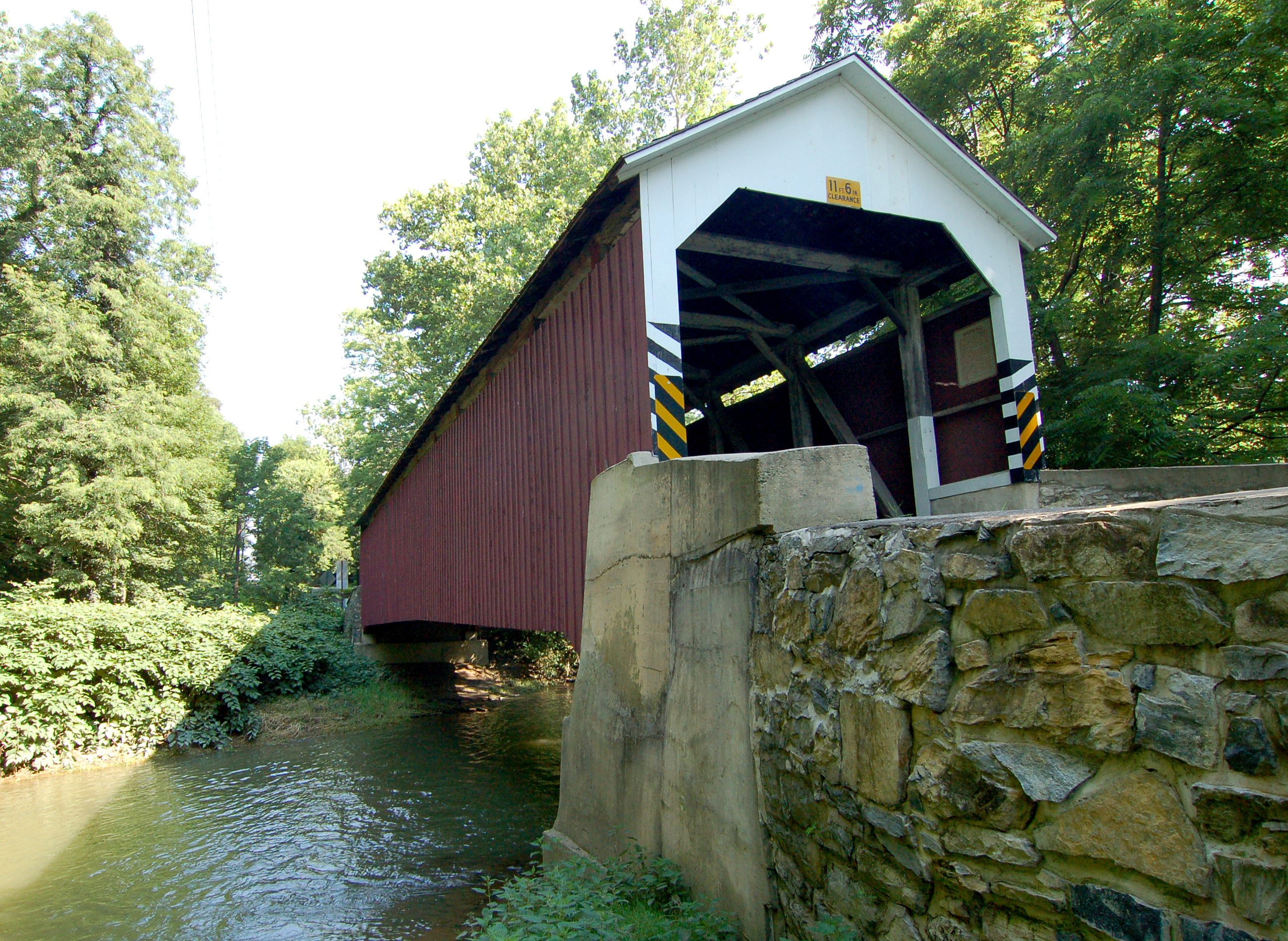
- The bridge in July 2006
- Coordinates: 40°4′33.7″N 76°28′15.5″W
- Carries: Siegrist Road
- Crosses: Chiques Creek
- Locale: Lancaster, Pennsylvania, United States
- Official name: Big Chiques #6 Bridge
- Other name: Michael Moore's Mill
- Maintained by: Lancaster County
- NBI #: 367230034202060

Characteristics
- Total length: 88 feet
- Width: 6.1 m (20 ft)

History
- Constructed by: James C. Carpenter
- Built: 1885
- Siegrist's Mill Covered Bridge
- U.S. National Register of Historic Places
- MPS: Covered Bridge of Lancaster County TR
- NRHP reference No.: 80003513
- Added to NRHP: December 10, 1980

Location
- Interactive map of Siegrist's Mill Covered Bridge

The Siegrist's Mill Covered Bridge is an 88-foot (27 m), Burr Arch Truss covered bridge over Chiques Creek between Rapho and West Hempfield townships, Lancaster County in U.S. state of Pennsylvania. Owned and maintained by the county, its official designation is the Big Chiques #6 Bridge.

The bridge's World Guide to Covered Bridges Number is 38–36–37. Added in 1980, it was listed on the National Register of Historic Places as structure number 80003513. The bridge is less than a mile away from the Forry's Mill Covered Bridge.

== History ==
The bridge was built in 1885 by James C. Carpenter. It was named after the Siegrist family who lived nearby.

The bridge survived Hurricane Agnes in 1972 with only minor damage. However, the bridge was ripped from its foundations and swept downstream on September 8, 2011, by flooding caused by remnants of Tropical Storm Lee. The bridge's siding, roof and some structural members needed to be replaced. The repairs were expected to cost $750,000 and the bridge was planned to be reopened in November 2012, eventually re-opening in August 2013.

== Design ==
The bridge has a single span, wooden, double Burr arch trusses design with the addition of steel hanger rods. The deck is made from oak planks. It is painted red, the traditional color of Lancaster County covered bridges, on both the inside and outside. Both approaches to the bridge are painted in the traditional white color.

Biblical passages painted on boards are attached to the framing under the bridge deck.

=== Dimensions ===
- Length: 88 feet (27 m) span and 102 feet (31 m) total length
- Width: 12 feet 9 inches (3.89 m) clear deck and 15 feet (4.6 m) total width
- Overhead clearance: 10 feet 6 inches (3.20 m)
- Underclearance: 10 feet (3.0 m)

== Gallery ==
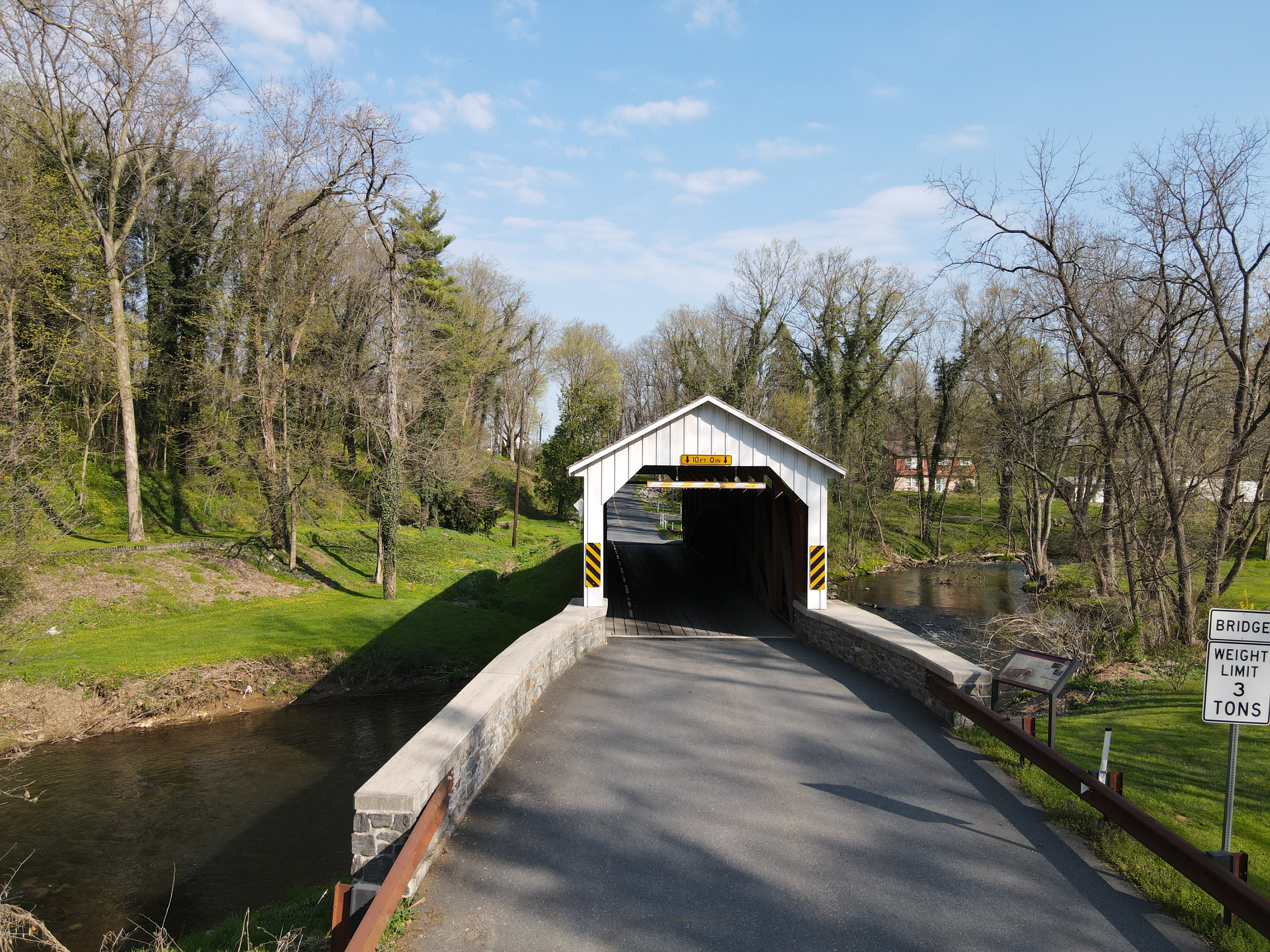
Approach view of the bridge from the air

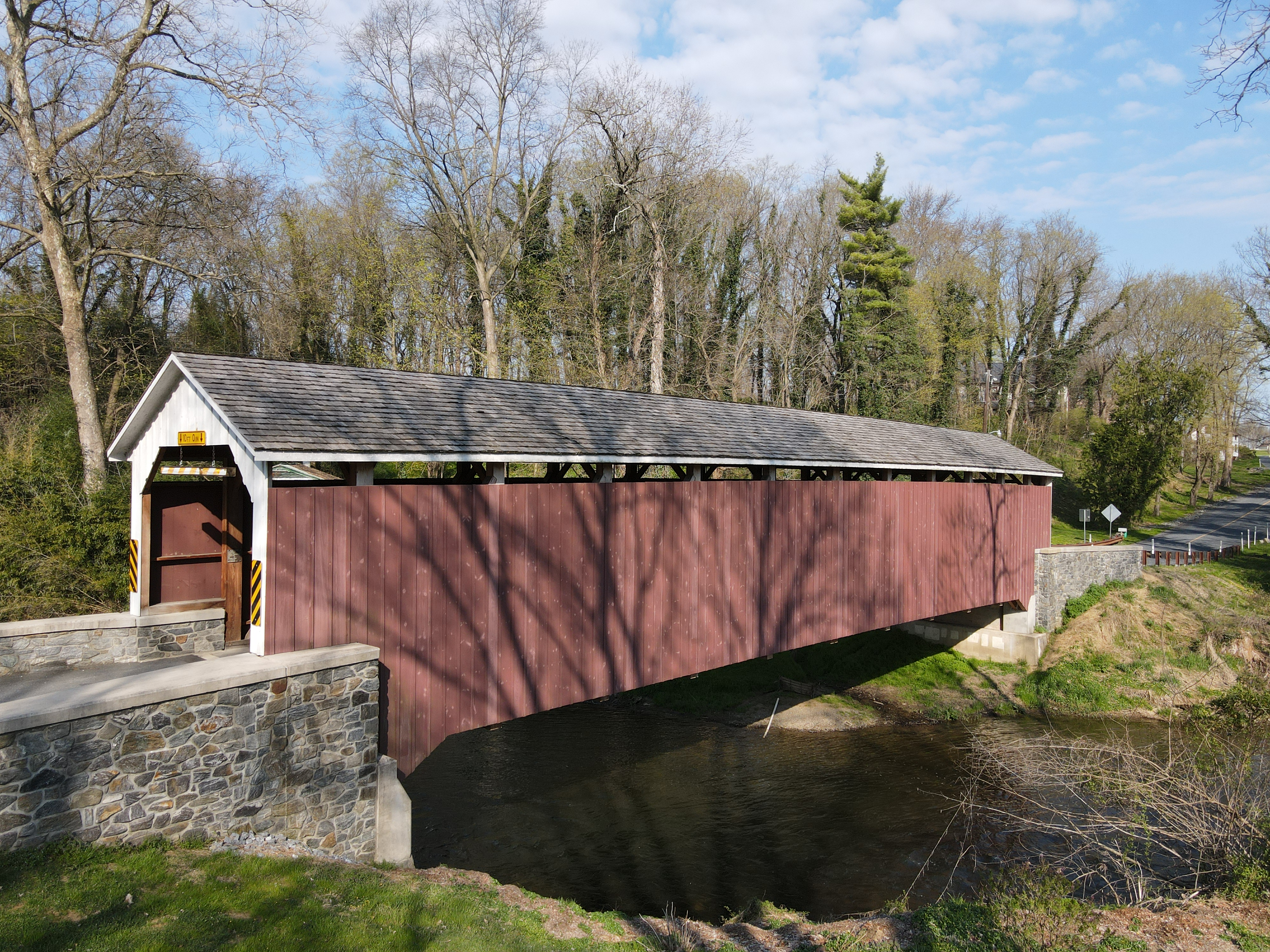
Three quarters view of the bridge from the air

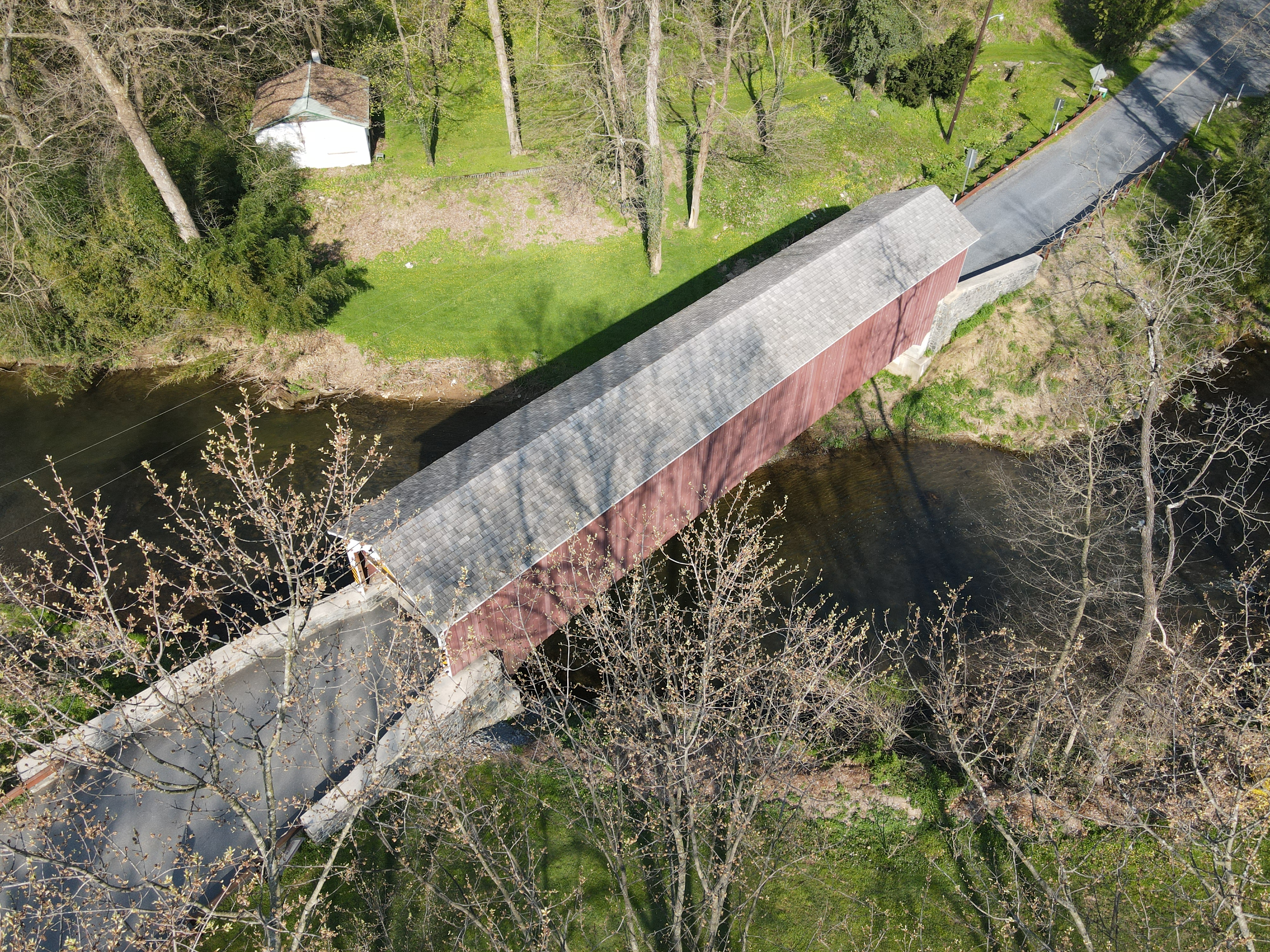
Overhead view of the bridge from the air

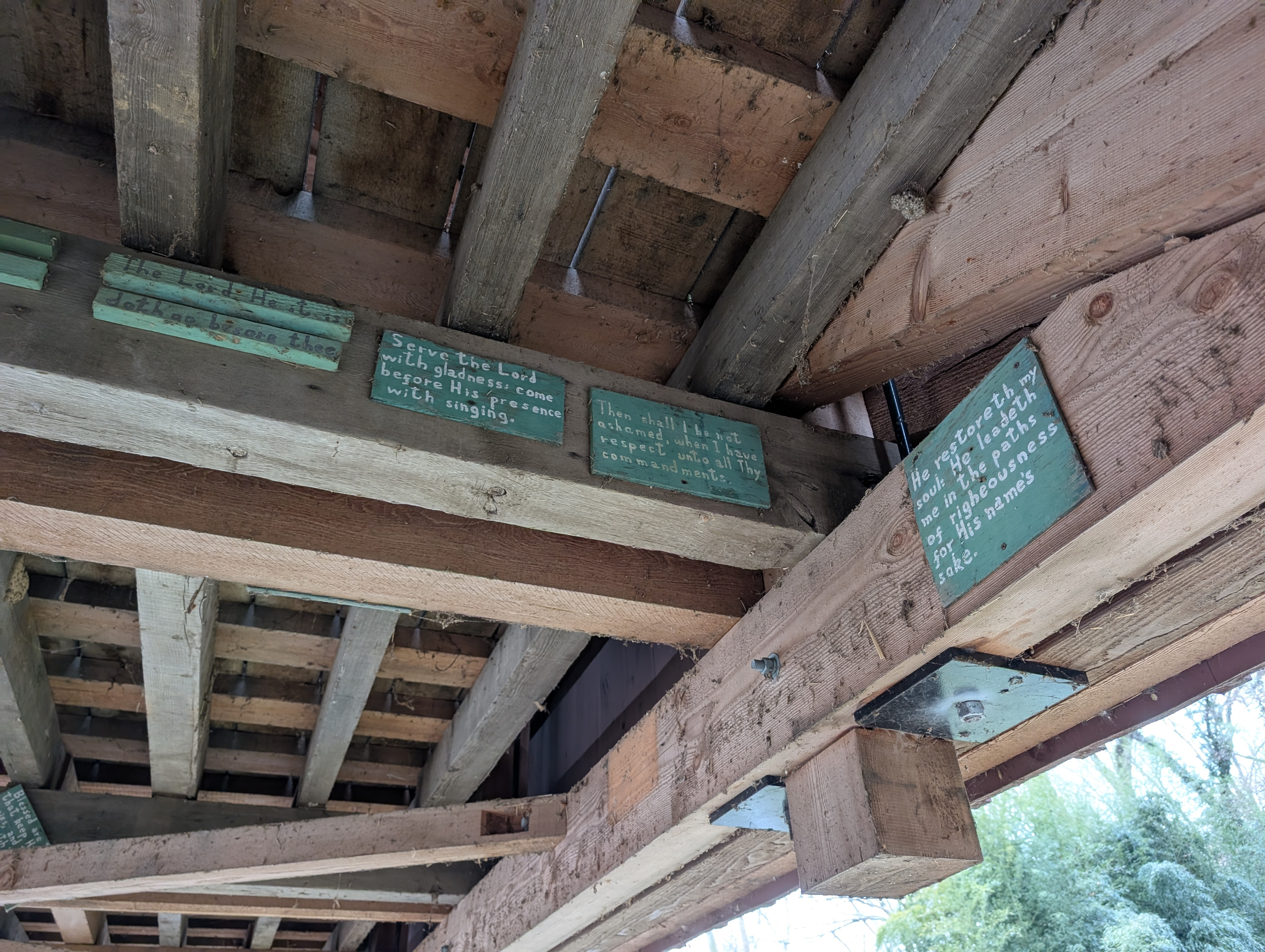
The underside of the bridge showing biblical passages

== See also ==
- List of bridges on the National Register of Historic Places in Pennsylvania
- List of covered bridges in Lancaster County, Pennsylvania
- National Register of Historic Places listings in Lancaster County, Pennsylvania
