= Rapho Township, Pennsylvania =

Township in Pennsylvania, US

Coordinates: 40°12′00″N 76°30′05″W

- Township
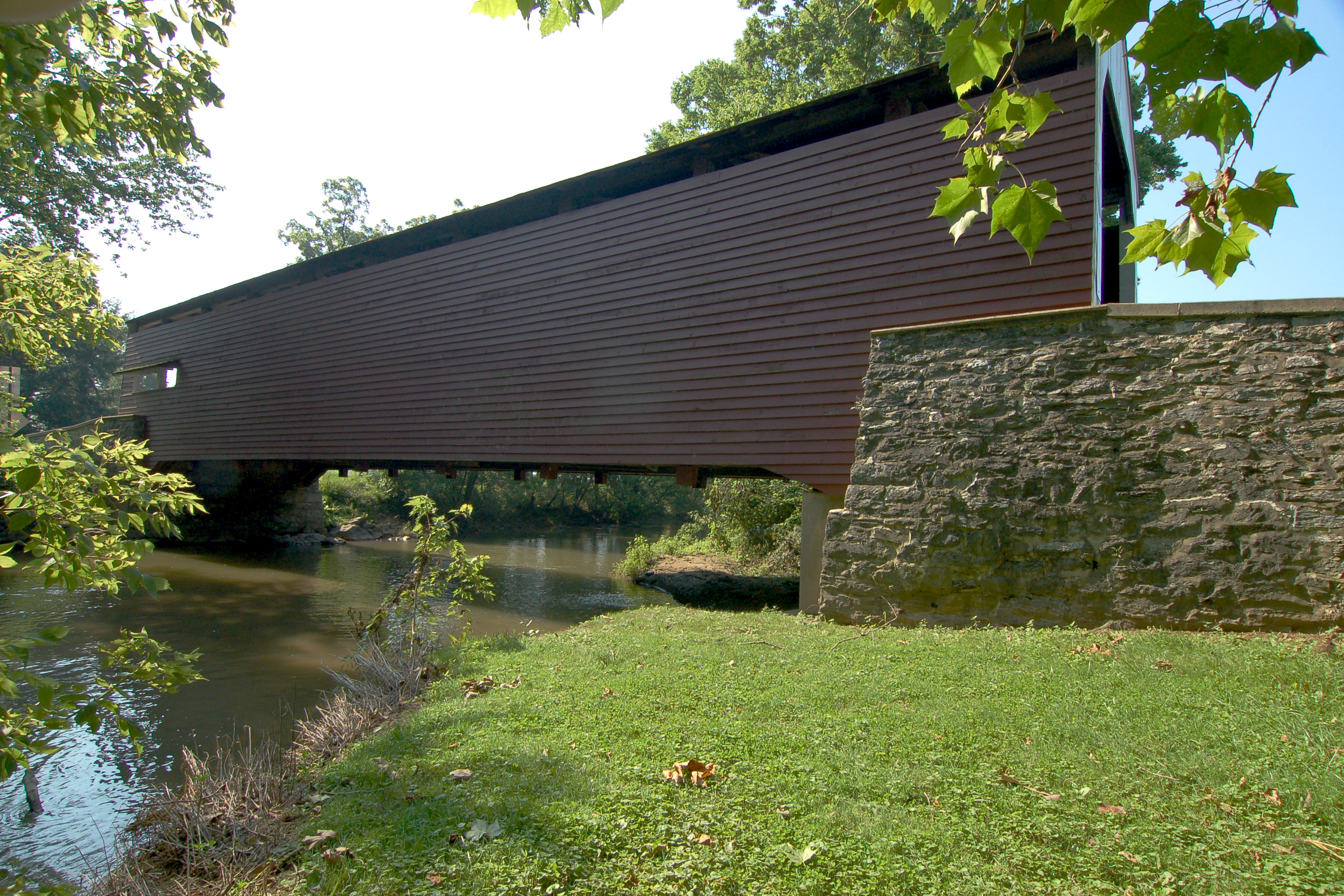
- Schenck's Mill Covered Bridge in Rapho Township

- Seal

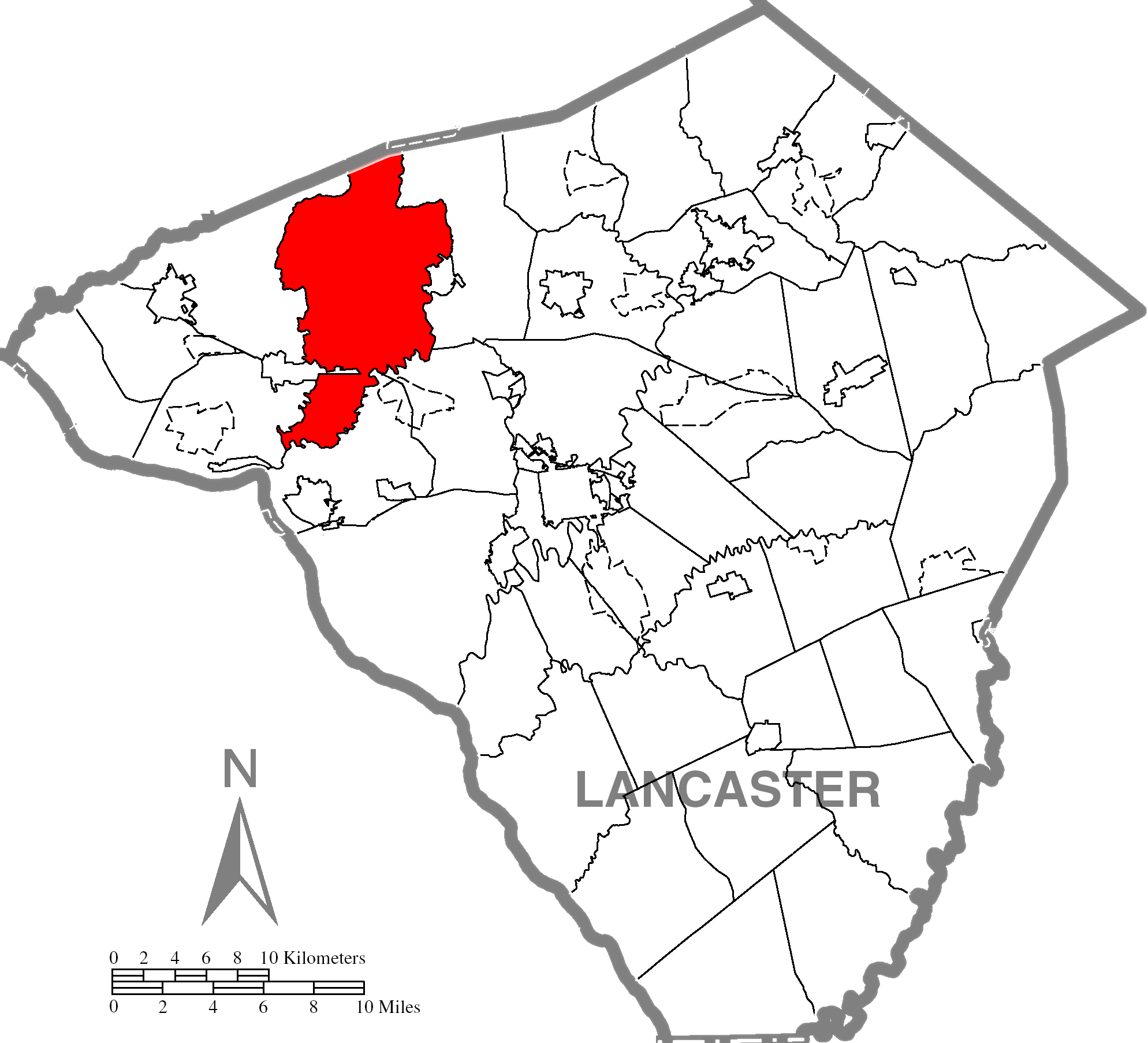
- Map of Lancaster County, Pennsylvania highlighting Rapho Township

- Map of Lancaster County, Pennsylvania
- Country: United States
- State: Pennsylvania
- County: Lancaster
- Settled: 1721
- Incorporated: 1741
- Named for: Raphoe

Government
  - Type: Board of Supervisors

Area
  - Total: 47.78 sq mi (123.74 km^{2})
  - Land: 47.42 sq mi (122.83 km^{2})
  - Water: 0.35 sq mi (0.91 km^{2})

Population (2020)
  - Total: 12,058 ▲
  - Estimate (2021): 12,065
  - Density: 249.2/sq mi (96.23/km^{2})
- Time zone: UTC-5 (Eastern (EST))
  - Summer (DST): UTC-4 (EDT)
- Area code: 717
- FIPS code: 42-071-63440
- Website: raphotownship.com

Rapho Township is a township that is located in northwestern Lancaster County, Pennsylvania, United States. The population was 12,058 at the time of the 2020 census.

== History ==
This township was named after Raphoe, County Donegal, Ireland.

The Kauffman's Distillery Covered Bridge, Mount Hope Estate, Forry's Mill Covered Bridge, and Siegrist's Mill Covered Bridge are listed on the National Register of Historic Places.

== Geography ==
According to the United States Census Bureau, the township has a total area of 47.5 square miles (123.1 km^{2}), all land.

Unincorporated communities in the township include Mastersonville, Union Square, Old Line, Naumanstown, Sporting Hill, and Newtown.

== Demographics ==
Historical population
Census	Pop.	Note	%±
2000	8,578		—
2010	10,442		21.7%
2020	12,058		15.5%
2021 (est.)	12,065		0.1%
U.S. Decennial Census

As of the census of 2000, there were 8,578 people, 3,075 households, and 2,398 families living in the township.

The population density was 180.5 inhabitants per square mile (69.7/km^{2}). There were 3,185 housing units at an average density of 67.0 units per square mile (25.9 units/km^{2}).

The racial makeup of the township was 97.72% White, 0.29% African American, 0.08% Native American, 0.80% Asian, 0.51% from other races, and 0.59% from two or more races. Hispanic or Latino of any race were 0.80% of the population.

There were 3,075 households, out of which 35.0% had children who under the age of eighteen living with them; 70.5% were married couples living together, 4.7% had a female householder with no husband present, and 22.0% were non-families. 18.6% of all households were made up of individuals, and 7.0% had someone living alone who was sixty-five years of age or older.

The average household size was 2.76 and the average family size was 3.17.

Within the township, the population was spread out, with 27.1% of residents who were under the age of eighteen, 7.5% from 18 to 24, 28.1% who were aged twenty-five to sixty-four, 25.6% who were aged forty-five to sixty-four, and 11.7% who were sixty-five years of age or older. The median age was thirty-eight years.

For every one hundred females, there were 103.0 males. For every one hundred females who were aged eighteen or older, there were 98.4 males.

The median income for a household in the township was $50,063, and the median income for a family was $55,625. Males had a median income of $36,935 compared with that $25,402 for females.

The per capita income for the township was $20,412.

Approximately 3.0% of families and 4.1% of the population were living below the poverty line, including 2.9% of those who were under the age of eighteen and 6.4% of those who were aged sixty-five or older.
