= Forry's Mill Covered Bridge =

Covered bridge in Pennsylvania, US

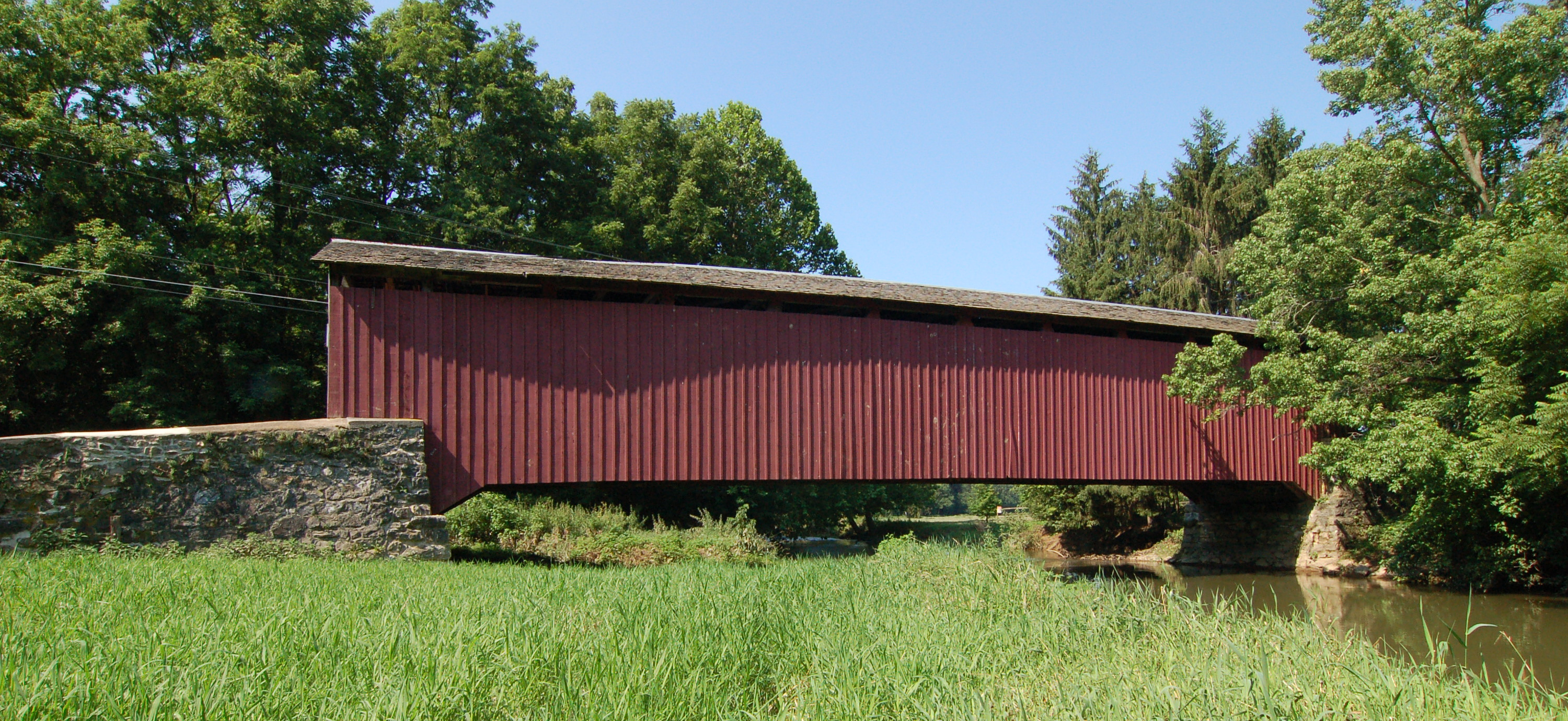
- Coordinates: 40.06646°N 76.4781°W
- Locale: Lancaster County, Pennsylvania, United States
- Official name: Big Chiques #7 Bridge

Characteristics
- Design: single span, double Burr arch truss
- Total length: 103 feet (31.4 m)

History
- Constructed by: Elias McMellen
- Construction start: 1869
- Forry's Mill Covered Bridge
- U.S. National Register of Historic Places
- MPS: Covered Bridges of Lancaster County TR
- NRHP reference No.: 80003512
- Added to NRHP: December 11, 1980

Location
- Interactive map of Forry's Mill Covered Bridge

The Forry's Mill Covered Bridge is the last covered bridge that spans Chiques Creek in West Hempfield in Lancaster County, Pennsylvania, United States. A county-owned and maintained bridge, its official designation is the Big Chiques #7 Bridge. (Chiques Creek was known as Chickies Creek until 2002).

The bridge has a single span, wooden, double Burr arch trusses design with the addition of steel hanger rods. The deck is made from oak planks. It is painted red, the traditional color of Lancaster County covered bridges, on both the inside and outside. Both approaches to the bridge are painted in the traditional white color.

The bridge's WGCB Number is 38-36-28. In 1980 it was added to the National Register of Historic Places as structure number 80003512. It is located at 40°4′3.6″N 76°28′40.8″W (40.06767, -76.47800).

Forry's Mill Covered Bridge is located in West Hempfield Township on Bridge Valley Road 0.4 km (0.25 mi) north of Pennsylvania route 23 5.5 km (3.4 mi) east of Marietta, less than a mile away from Siegrist's Mill Covered Bridge.

== History ==
Forry's Mill Covered Bridge was originally built in 1869 by Elias McMellen for a cost of $2969. The bridge required repairs in 1925 to its sides and floor.

== Dimensions ==
- Length: 91 feet 6 inches (0.15 m) span and 103 feet (31 m) total length
- Width: 12 feet 10 inches (3.91 m) clear deck and 15 feet (4.6 m) total width
- Overhead clearance: 10 feet 6 inches (3.20 m)
- Underclearance: 10 feet 6 inches (3.20 m)

== Gallery ==
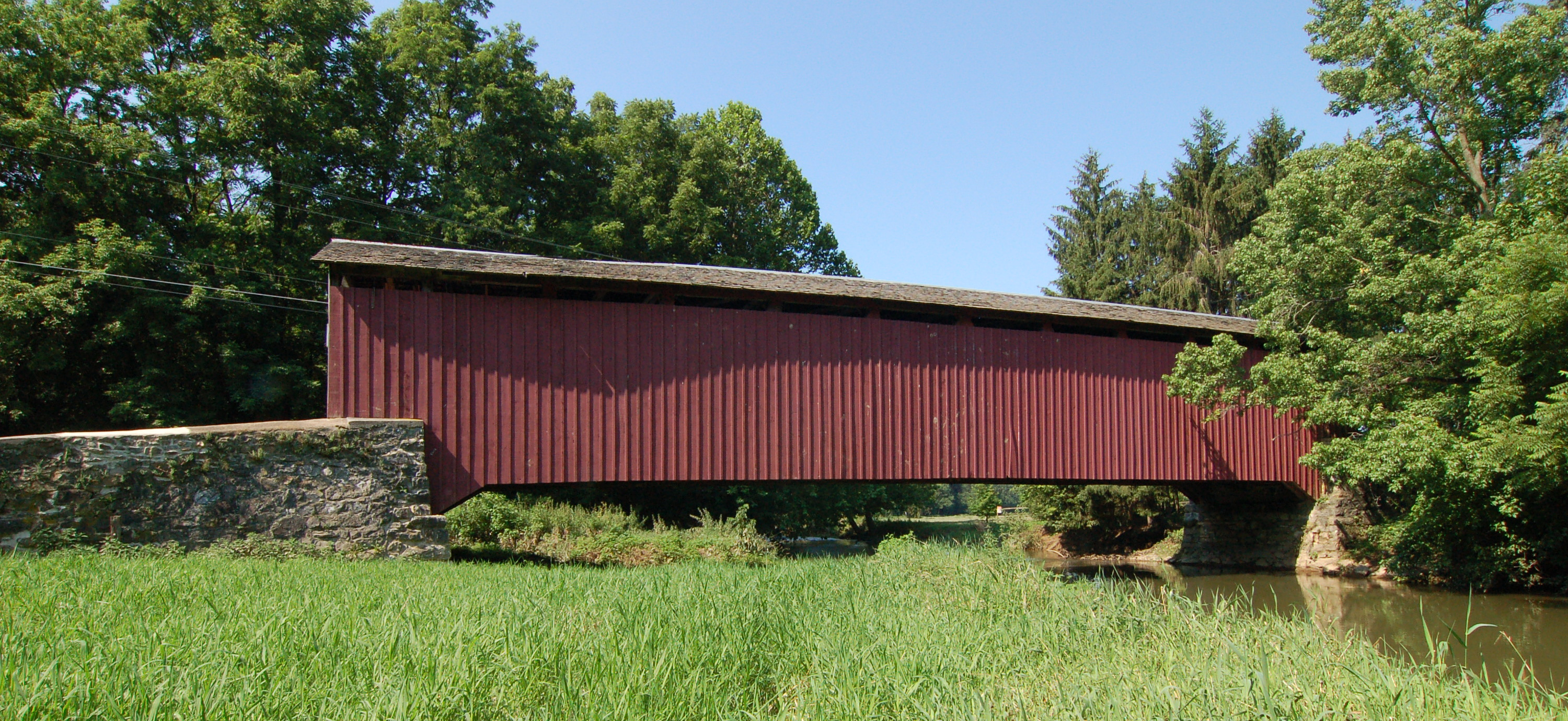
Wide view of the side of the bridge

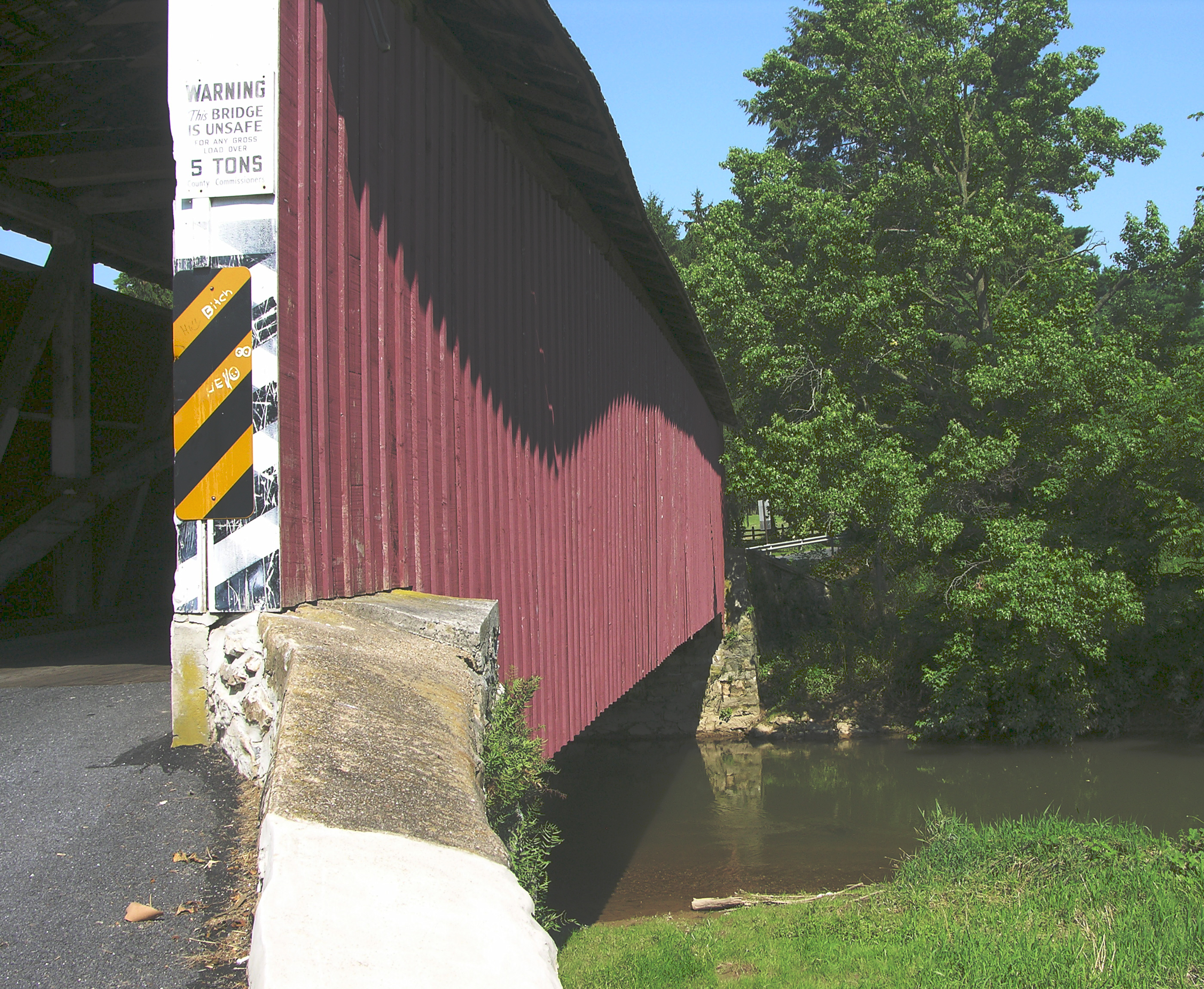
A closeup of the side of the bridge

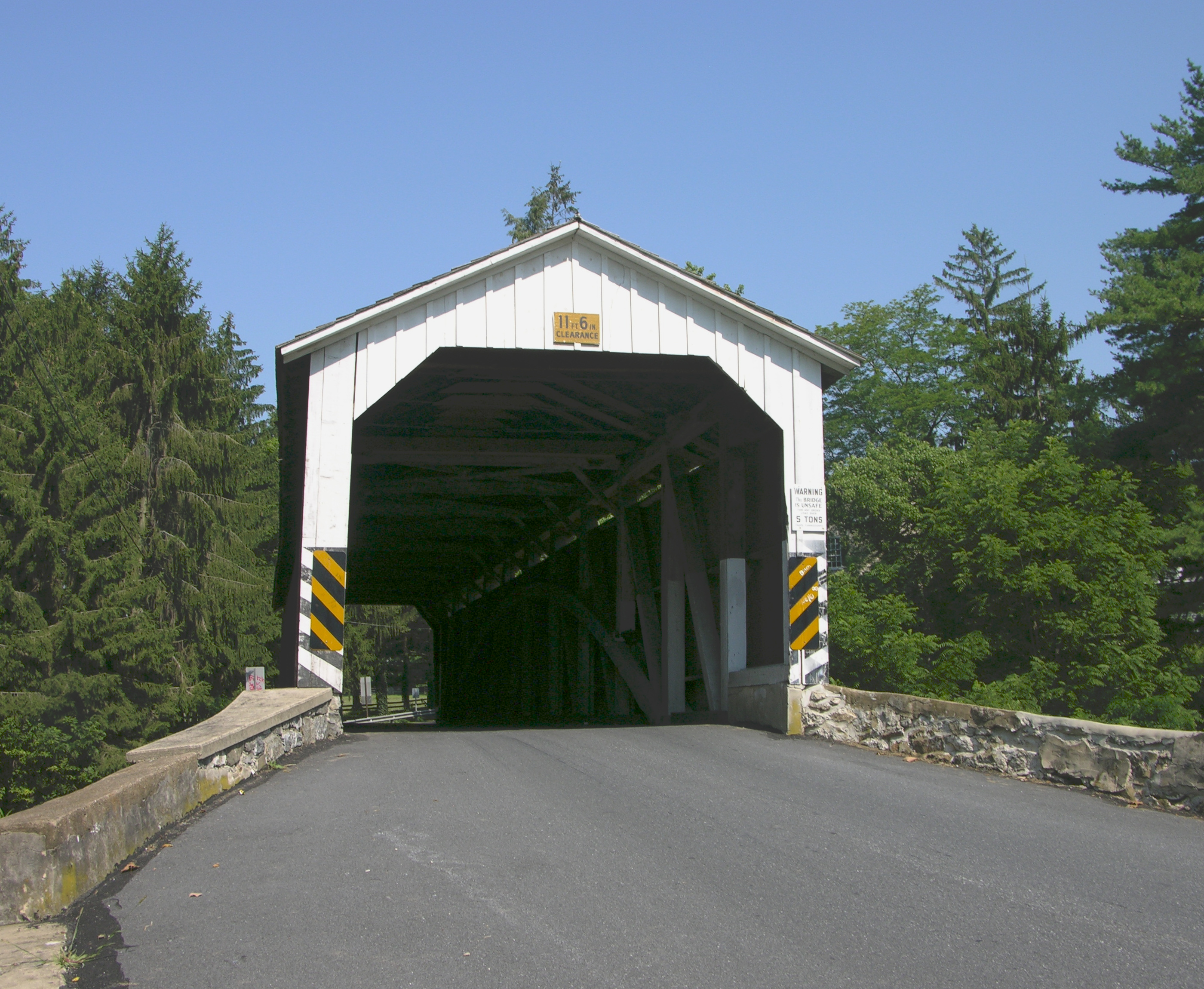
One of the approaches to the bridge

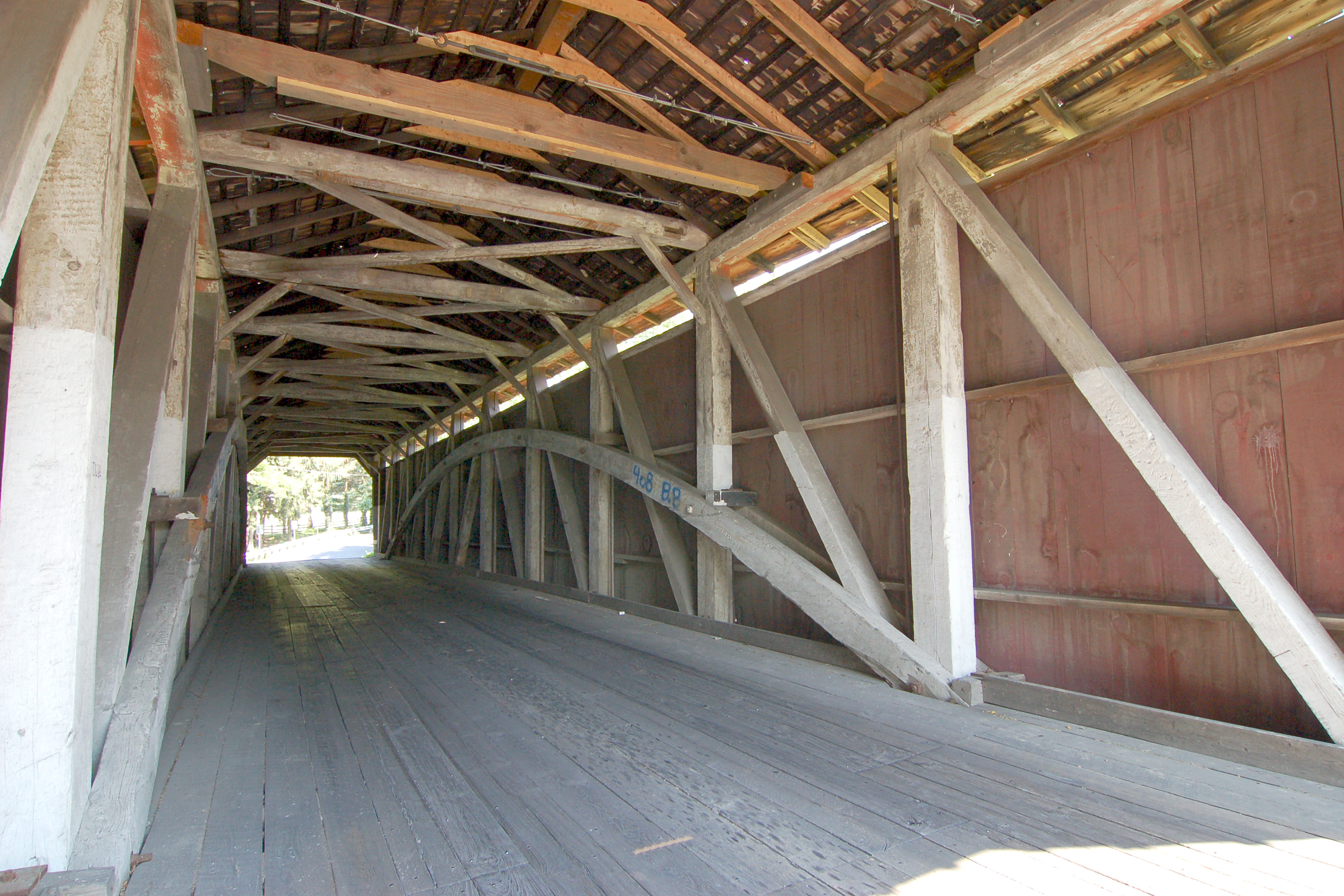
Inside of the bridge showing the Burr arch truss design

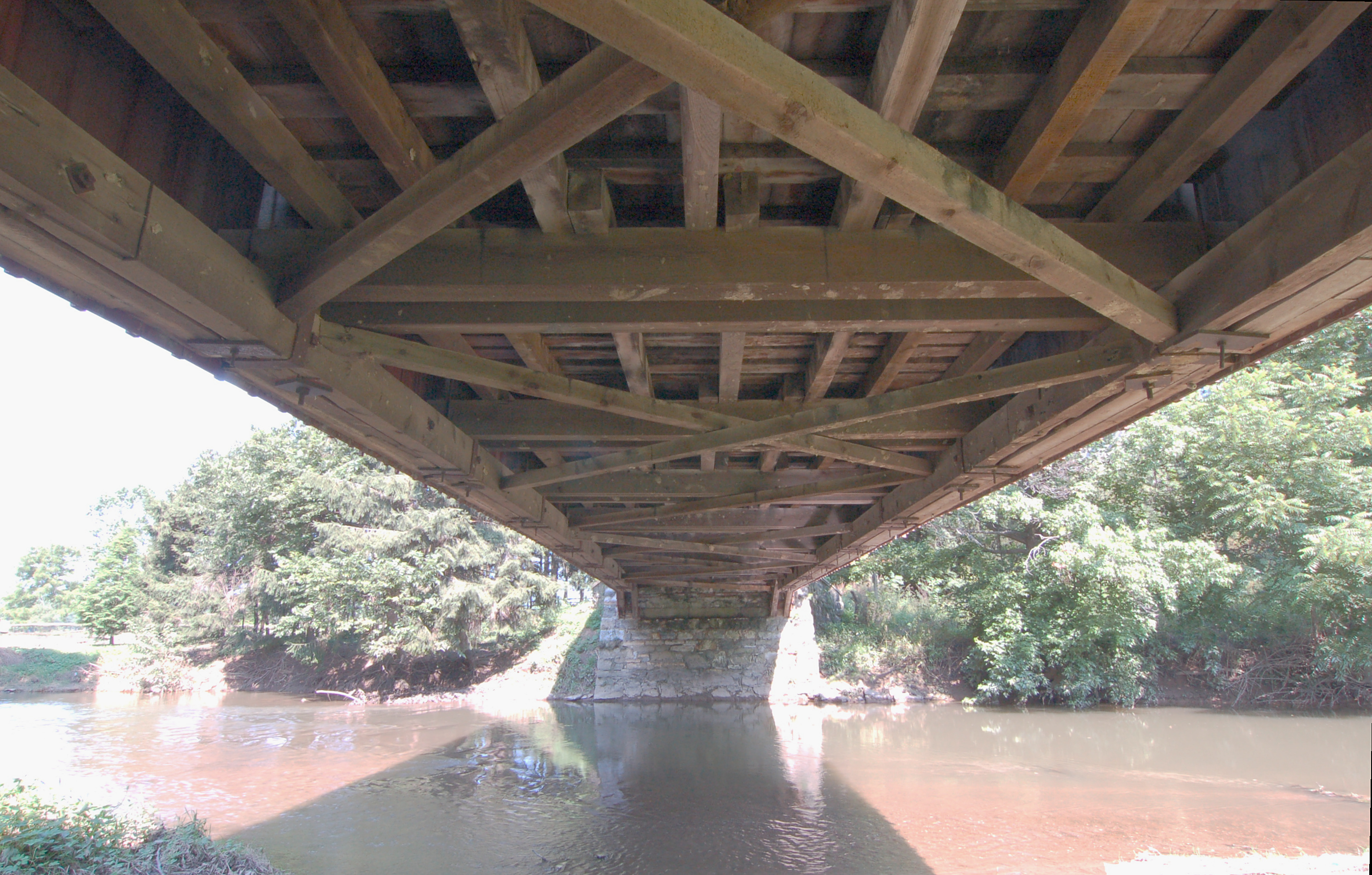
The underside of the bridge

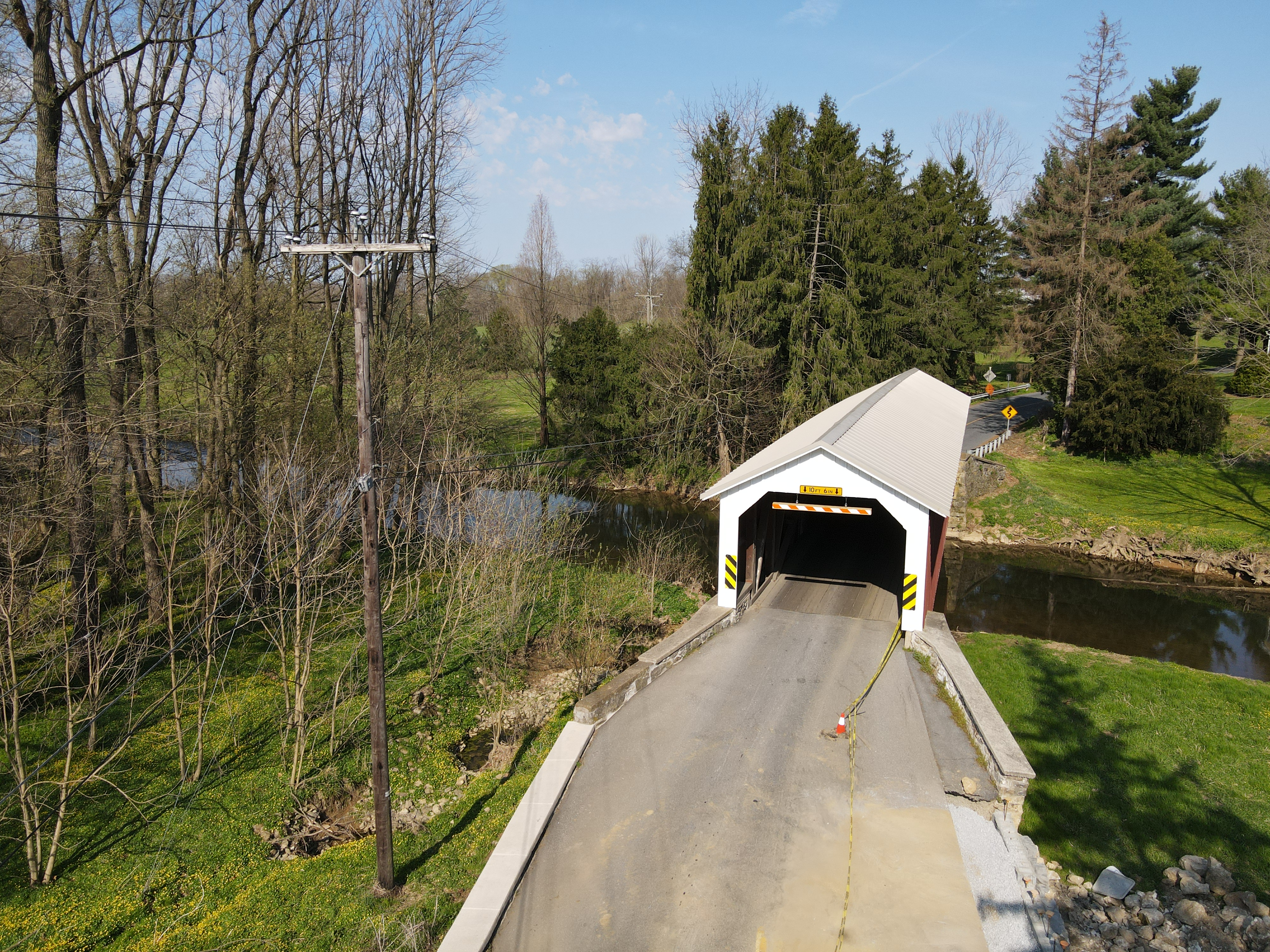
A view of the bridge from the air

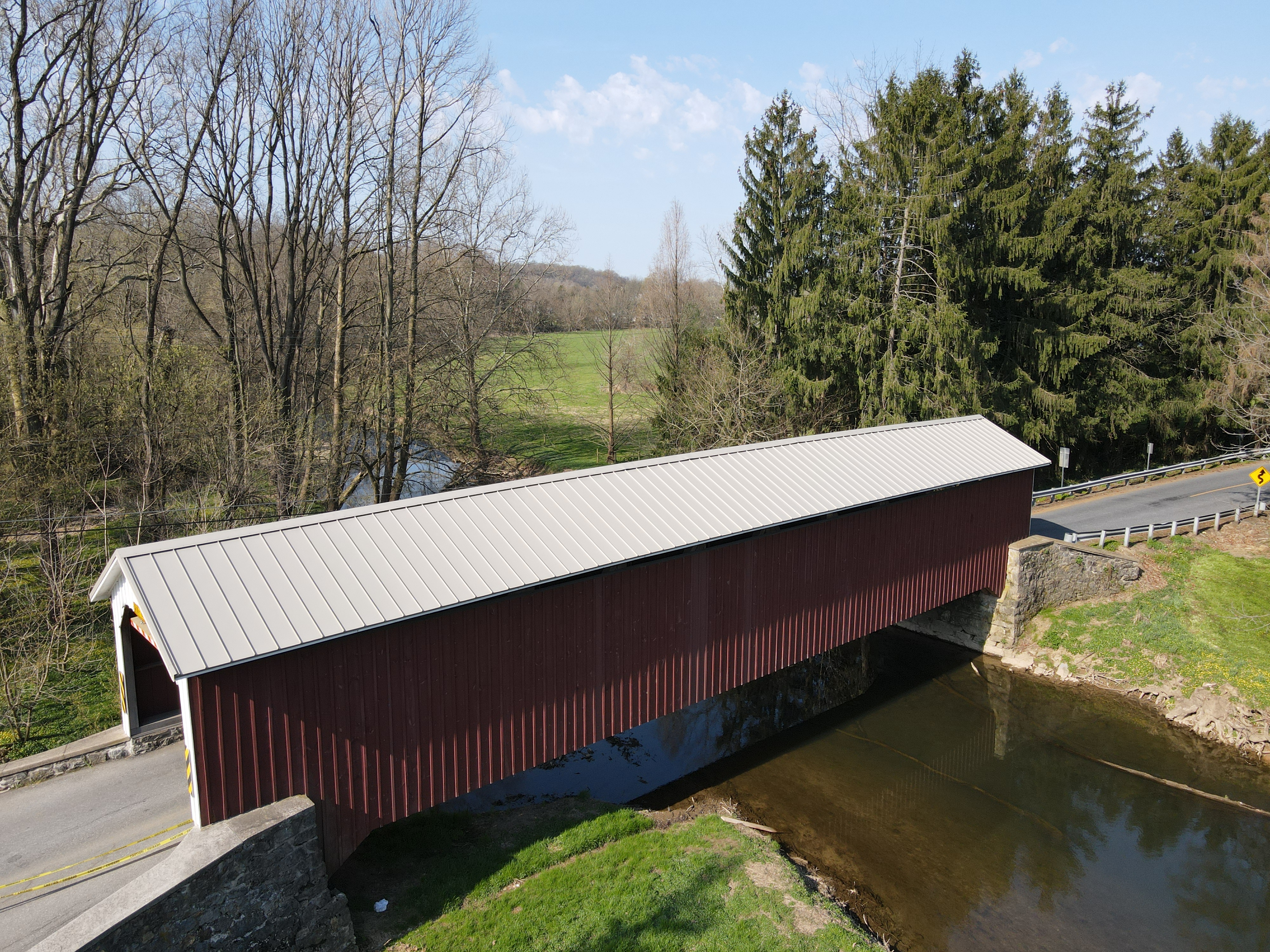
A side view of the bridge from the air

== See also ==
- Burr arch truss
- List of Lancaster County covered bridges
