= Charles Chips =

American producer of snack foods

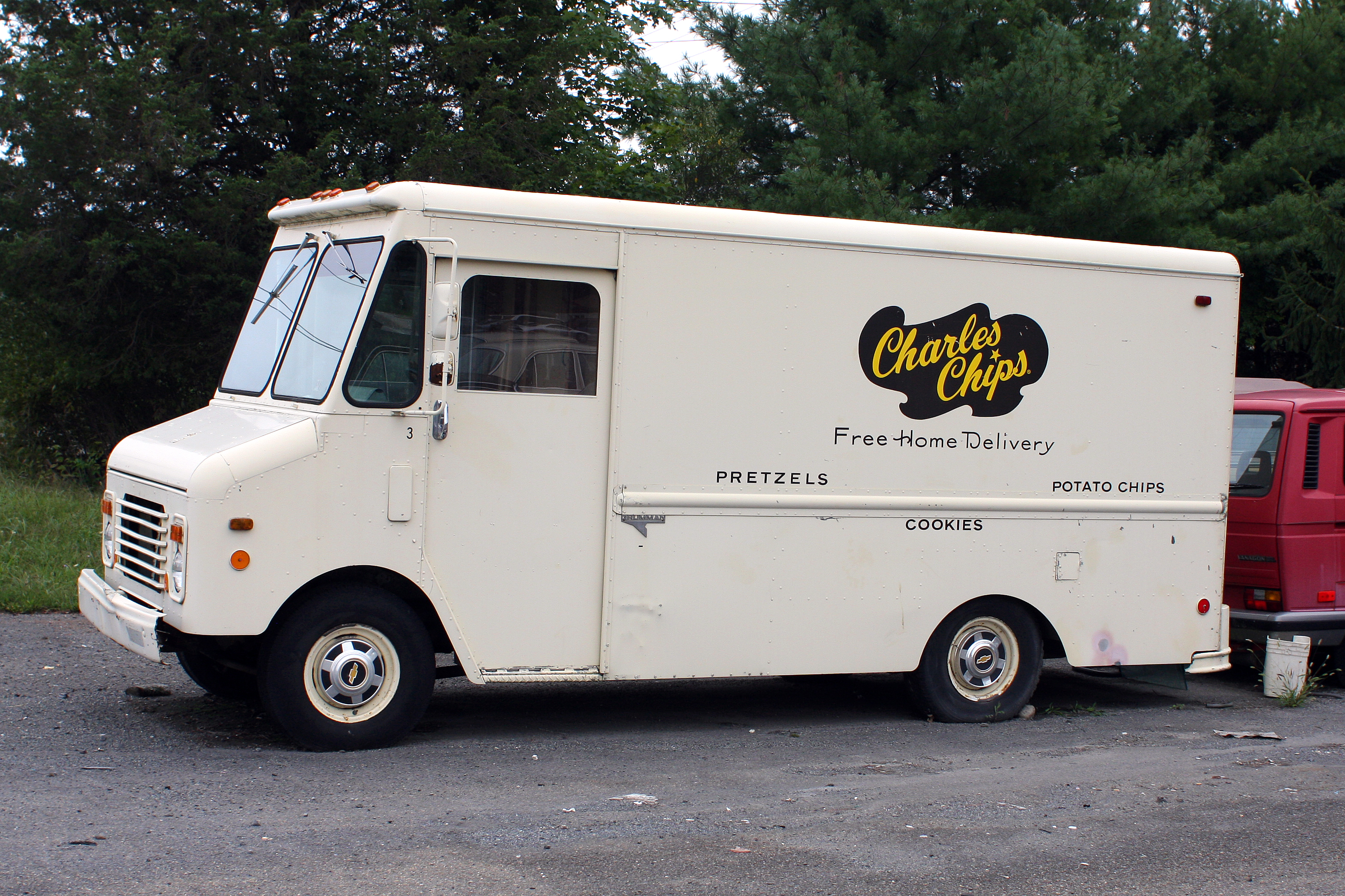
A Charles Chips delivery van

Charles Chips is an American maker of snack foods, especially potato chips. It was known for home and office delivery of its products in distinctive tins.

They were known for their signature sales slogan, "Chippin' it!"

== History ==
The company was started in 1942 when Effie Musser sold her potato chips through a distributor, who put them in distinctive tins, and named them Charles Chips after Charles Street in Baltimore. Effie and her husband soon took over the business and by 1946, moved production to a professional kitchen. They started offering home delivery of their chips, and added pretzels and cookies.

In 1974, the business model of home delivery became more challenging. The company made a strategic move to develop retail packaging and market their products into grocery and convenience stores. In 1979, Charles Chips began distribution into the California market from the Calhoun, KY plant.

In 1984, Charles Chips completed construction of a state-of-the-art pretzel and corn based snack production facility in Mountville, PA.

In 1990, the company had wholesale revenue in excess of $45 million. In 1991, the Mussers sold Charles Chips to a group of investors from Philadelphia. This new company went bankrupt 18 months later.

In 1993, Charles Chips was acquired by a popcorn company from Tampa, FL. They too went bankrupt about 18 months later.

In 1996, Hillside Snacks in North Arlington, NJ acquired the Charles Chips trademark and started marketing Charles Chips under a different recipe.

In early 2011, the Scardino family bought the brand, with plans to bring back the original recipes and the tins. They now sell chips, pretzels, and cookies from their website.

== Bibliography ==
- "Snack company passed through a number of owners: Charles Chips struggled against fierce competition" from The Morning Call
- "The Great Potato Chip Debate" and "Charles Chips on Comeback Trail" from Lancaster New Era
- "Chips Co. Still Delivers" from The Harlan Daily Enterprise
- "Tampa company to buy Charles Chips" from St. Petersburg Times
- "It's crunch time for Charles Chips - New owners say successful turnaround has a way to go " from Intelligencer Journal
- "The Crunchy Sound of Nostalgia" from South Florida Business Journal.
