= Hempfield, Pennsylvania =

Unincorporated community in Pennsylvania, US

- Unincorporated community
- Location within Pennsylvania Location within the United States
- Coordinates: 40°03′17″N 76°26′20″W
- Country: United States
- State: Pennsylvania
- County: Lancaster
- Township: West Hempfield
- Time zone: UTC-5 (Eastern (EST))
  - Summer (DST): UTC-4 (EDT)

Hempfield is an unincorporated community in Lancaster County, Pennsylvania, United States. Hempfield is a tiny locale in West Hempfield Township, a few miles west of Lancaster, the county seat.

== History ==
Hempfield Township was one of the original townships set off when the boundaries of Lancaster County were surveyed in 1729. At that time, it included the present areas of East Hempfield Township, West Hempfield Township, Manor Township, and the Boroughs of Columbia, Mountville, and East Petersburg.

== Etymology ==
Hempfield is said to be so named on account of the hemp fields formerly located in the area.

== Notable person ==
- Christian Strenge, fraktur artist

== See also ==
- Hempfield High School
