= Hempfield School District =

School district in Pennsylvania

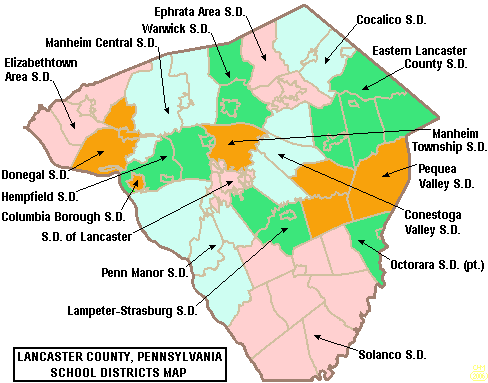

Location
- Pennsylvania United States

District information
- Type: School

Students and staff
- Students: 6800+
- Teachers: 500+

Other information
- Website: Hempfield School District

Hempfield School District is a school district of 6800+ students educated in 10 schools by 500+ teachers in Lancaster County, Pennsylvania, United States. The district includes Hempfield High School. It is a member of Lancaster-Lebanon Intermediate Unit (IU) 13.
