= Mountville, Pennsylvania =

Borough in Pennsylvania, US

- Borough
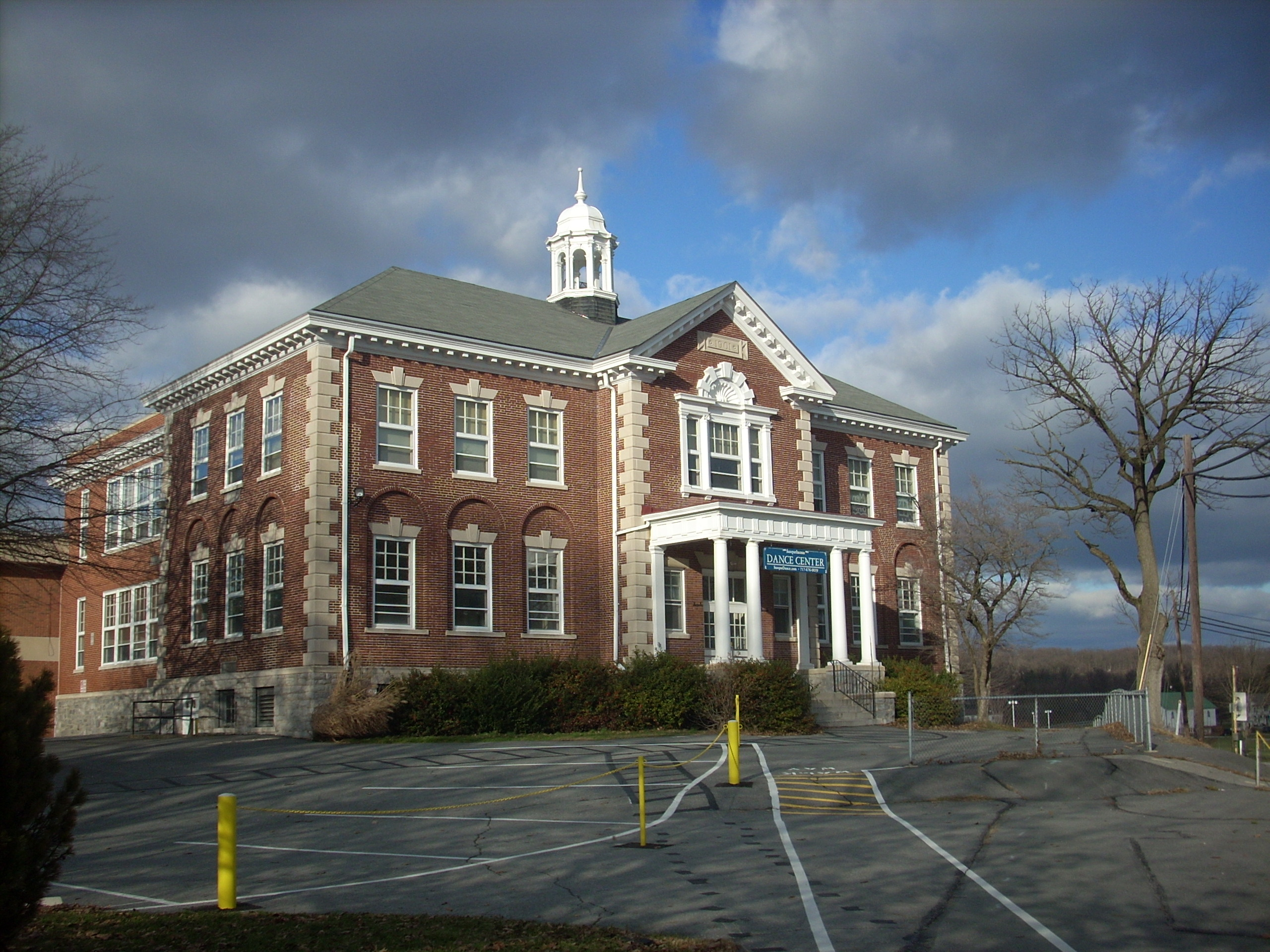
- Mountville Community Center

- Location in Lancaster County, Pennsylvania

- Location in Pennsylvania Location in the United States
- Coordinates: 40°02′23″N 76°25′57″W
- Country: United States
- State: Pennsylvania
- County: Lancaster

Area
  - Total: 0.86 sq mi (2.23 km^{2})
  - Land: 0.86 sq mi (2.23 km^{2})
  - Water: 0 sq mi (0.00 km^{2})
- Elevation: 443 ft (135 m)

Population (2020)
  - Total: 3,017
  - Density: 3,505.1/sq mi (1,353.31/km^{2})
- Time zone: UTC-5 (EST)
  - Summer (DST): UTC-4 (EDT)
- ZIP Code: 17554
- Area code: 717
- FIPS code: 42-52016
- Website: mountvilleborough.com

Mountville is a borough in Lancaster County, Pennsylvania, United States. The population was 3,022 at the 2020 census, an increase over the figure of 2,802 tabulated in 2010. The original Charles Chips potato chip factory was located here.

== Geography ==
Mountville is located in western Lancaster County at 40°2′23″N 76°25′57″W (40.039797, -76.432433). U.S. Route 30, a four-lane freeway, passes through the northern part of the borough, with access from College Avenue at the northeast edge of town. US 30 leads east 7 miles (11 km) to the northern part of Lancaster, the county seat, and west 17 miles (27 km) to York. Pennsylvania Route 462 runs through the center of Mountville as Columbia Avenue; it leads east 6 miles (10 km) to the center of Lancaster and west 5 miles (8 km) to Columbia.

According to the United States Census Bureau, Mountville has a total area of 0.85 square miles (2.2 km^{2}), of which 0.7 acres (2,719 m^{2}), or 0.12%, are water. The eastern side of Mountville is drained by the West Branch of Little Conestoga Creek, a southward-flowing tributary of the Conestoga River and part of the Susquehanna River watershed. The west side of the borough is drained by Strickler Run, a westward-flowing direct tributary of the Susquehanna.

== Demographics ==
Historical population
Census	Pop.	Note	%±
1860	325		—
1870	430		32.3%
1910	803		—
1920	757		−5.7%
1930	954		26.0%
1940	967		1.4%
1950	1,064		10.0%
1960	1,411		32.6%
1970	1,454		3.0%
1980	1,505		3.5%
1990	1,977		31.4%
2000	2,444		23.6%
2010	2,802		14.6%
2020	3,017		7.7%
2021 (est.)	3,006	▼	−0.4%

=== 2020 census ===
As of the 2020 census, Mountville had a population of 3,017. The median age was 42.9 years. 21.2% of residents were under the age of 18 and 21.0% of residents were 65 years of age or older. For every 100 females there were 92.9 males, and for every 100 females age 18 and over there were 86.6 males age 18 and over.

100.0% of residents lived in urban areas, while 0.0% lived in rural areas.

There were 1,265 households in Mountville, of which 28.0% had children under the age of 18 living in them. Of all households, 46.1% were married-couple households, 15.1% were households with a male householder and no spouse or partner present, and 30.7% were households with a female householder and no spouse or partner present. About 30.7% of all households were made up of individuals and 13.5% had someone living alone who was 65 years of age or older.

There were 1,297 housing units, of which 2.5% were vacant. The homeowner vacancy rate was 0.5% and the rental vacancy rate was 3.3%.

Racial composition as of the 2020 census
Race	Number	Percent
White	2,423	80.3%
Black or African American	160	5.3%
American Indian and Alaska Native	12	0.4%
Asian	79	2.6%
Native Hawaiian and Other Pacific Islander	2	0.1%
Some other race	157	5.2%
Two or more races	184	6.1%
Hispanic or Latino (of any race)	314	10.4%

=== 2000 census ===
As of the census of 2000, there were 2,444 people, 1,018 households, and 692 families residing in the borough. The population density was 2,856.8 inhabitants per square mile (1,103.0/km^{2}). There were 1,041 housing units at an average density of 1,216.8 per square mile (469.8/km^{2}). The racial makeup of the borough was 95.2% White, 1.3% African American, 0.0% Native American, 1.0% Asian, 1.3% from other races, and 1.1% from two or more races. Hispanic or Latino of any race were 2.7% of the population.

There were 1,018 households, out of which 28.9% had children under the age of 18 living with them, 52.1% were married couples living together, 12.4% had a female householder with no husband present, and 32.0% were non-families. 26.6% of all households were made up of individuals, and 7.5% had someone living alone who was 65 years of age or older. The average household size was 2.31 and the average family size was 2.76.

In the borough the population was spread out, with 20.9% under the age of 18, 8.4% from 18 to 24, 29.5% from 25 to 44, 25.5% from 45 to 64, and 15.7% who were 65 years of age or older. The median age was 40 years. For every 100 females there were 91.1 males. For every 100 females age 18 and over, there were 87.5 males.

=== Income and poverty ===
The median income for a household in the borough was $10,000, and the median income for a family was $20,928. Males had a median income of $9,021 versus $11,978 for females. The per capita income for the borough was $22,010. About 4.6% of families and 7.2% of the population were below the poverty line, including 12.8% of those under age 18 and 2.0% of those age 65 or over. Also, the borough has an unemployment rate of 4.6%.

== Services ==
Mountville is served by the West Hempfield Township Police, has one volunteer fire department, and is in the Hempfield School District.

== History ==
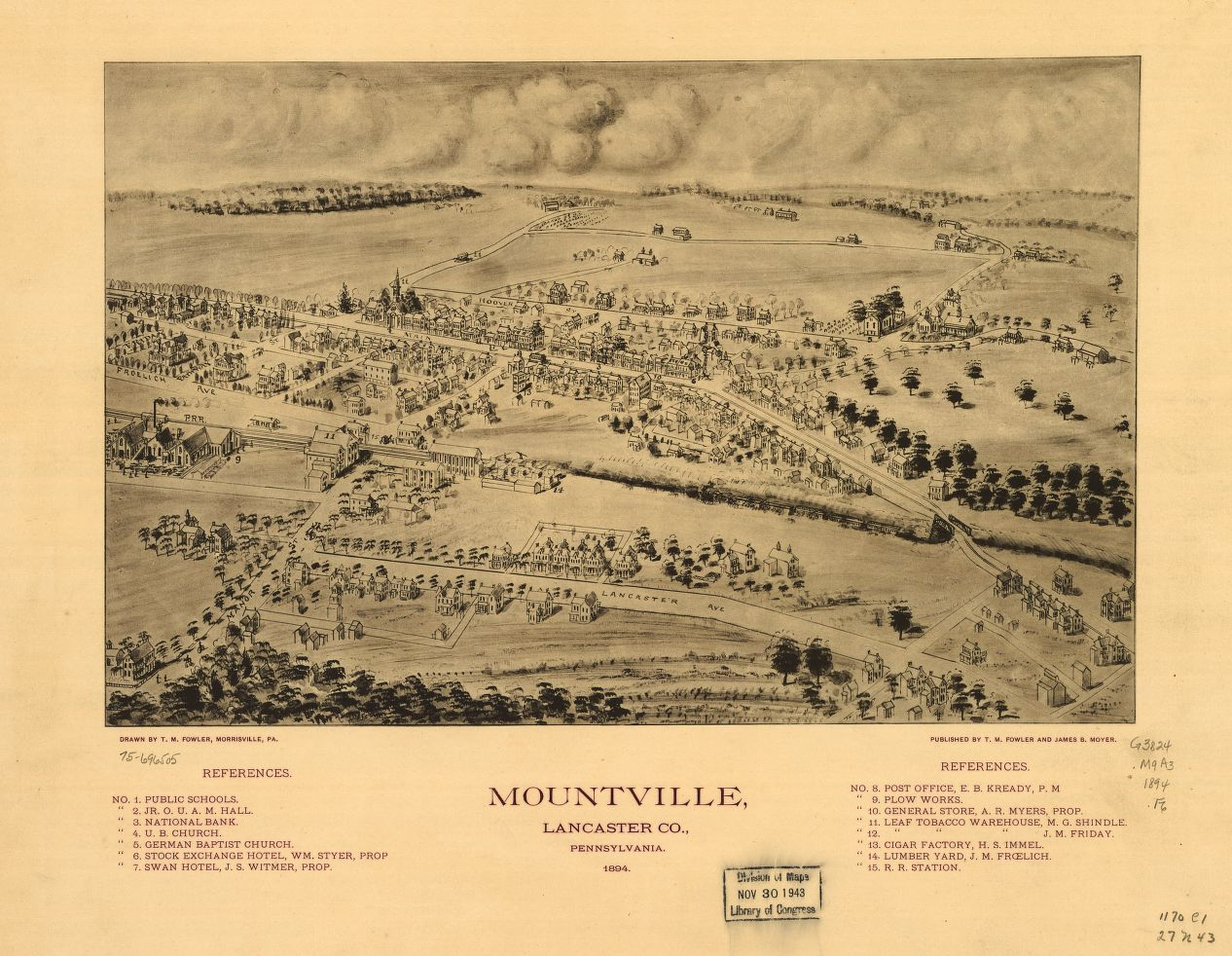
1894 birds-eye-view of Mountville borough, looking north

On January 11, 1814, Isaac Rohrer laid out the town that became known as Mountville, dividing it into 130 building lots, sold by lottery. Located 4 miles (6 km) east of Columbia in West Hempfield Township on the Lancaster and Susquehanna Turnpike, Mountville was originally named "Mount Pleasant" because it was situated on an elevation affording a pleasant view of the surrounding countryside in every direction.

In 1842, when the first post office was established in the town, the name was changed to "Mountville" because the postal service already had another Mount Pleasant registered in Pennsylvania.

Recognizing the need for a municipal water system, the town incorporated as a borough in 1906.

After several annexations of land adjoining the borough through the years since, Mountville now consists of just under one square mile of residential, commercial, industrial and public property. Mountville boasts one of the highest ratios of public park space per capita. With slightly more than 2,800 residents, the borough is served by the West Hempfield Township Police Department, protected by the Mountville Volunteer Fire Company, and educated by the Hempfield School District.

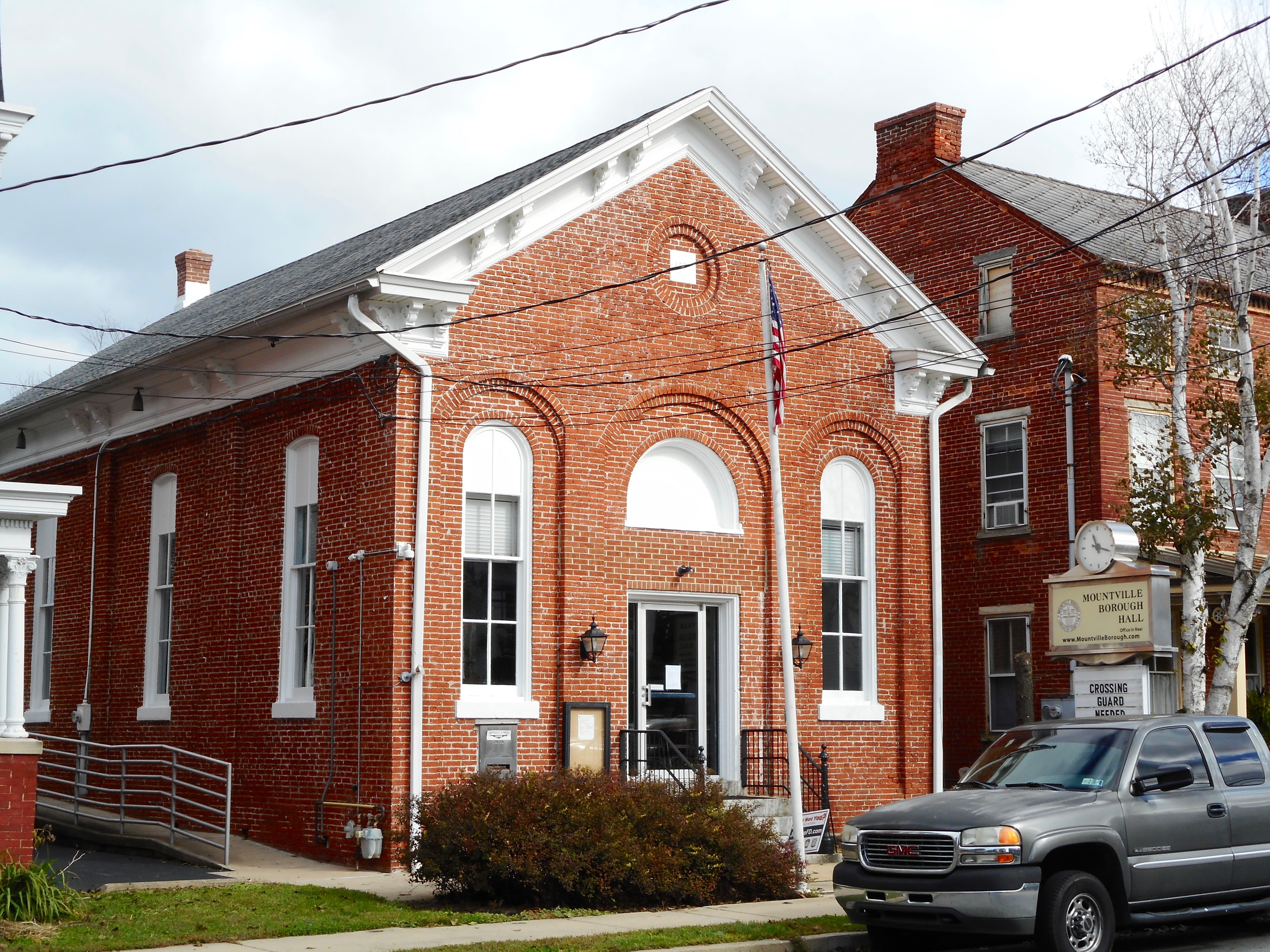
Borough Hall

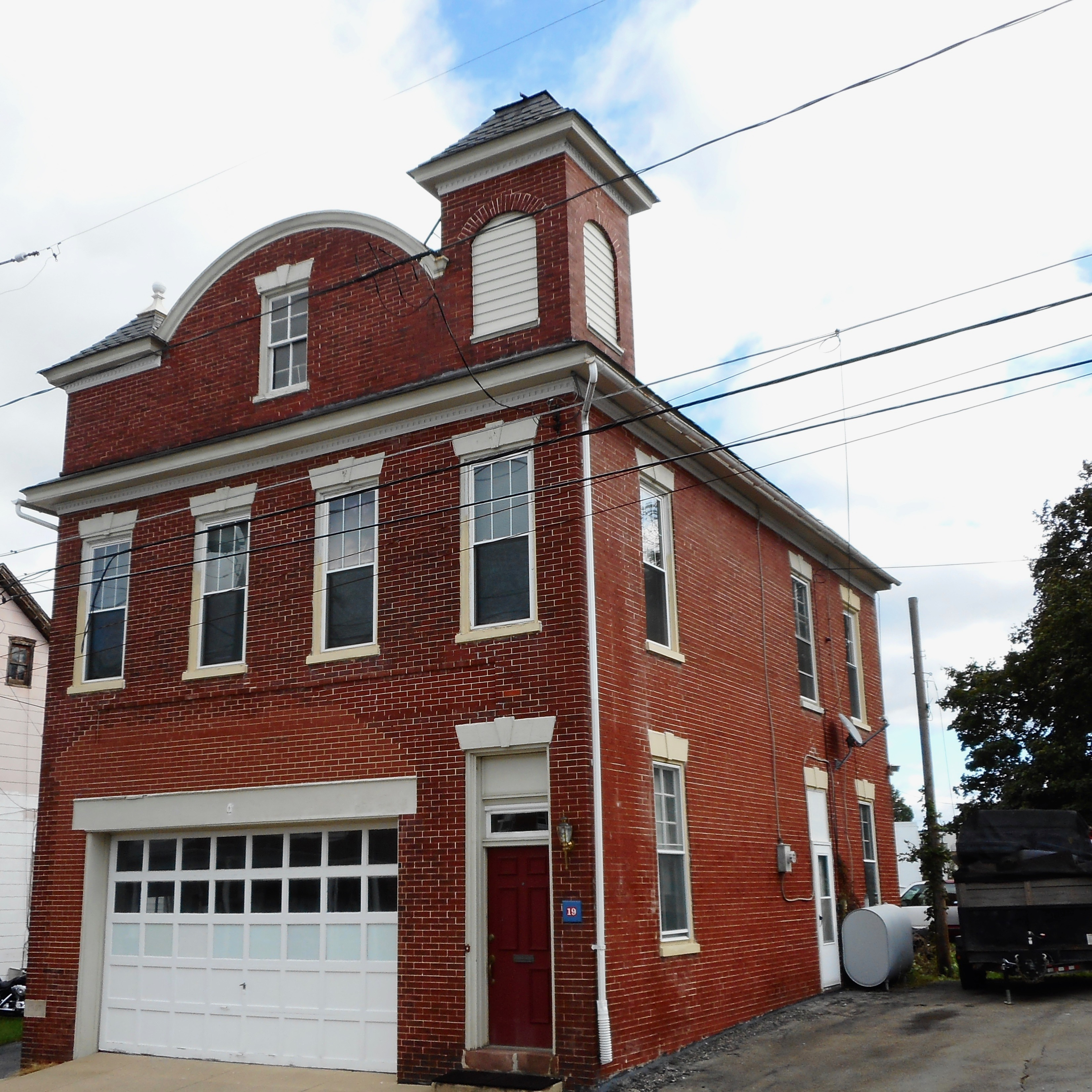
1907 firehouse

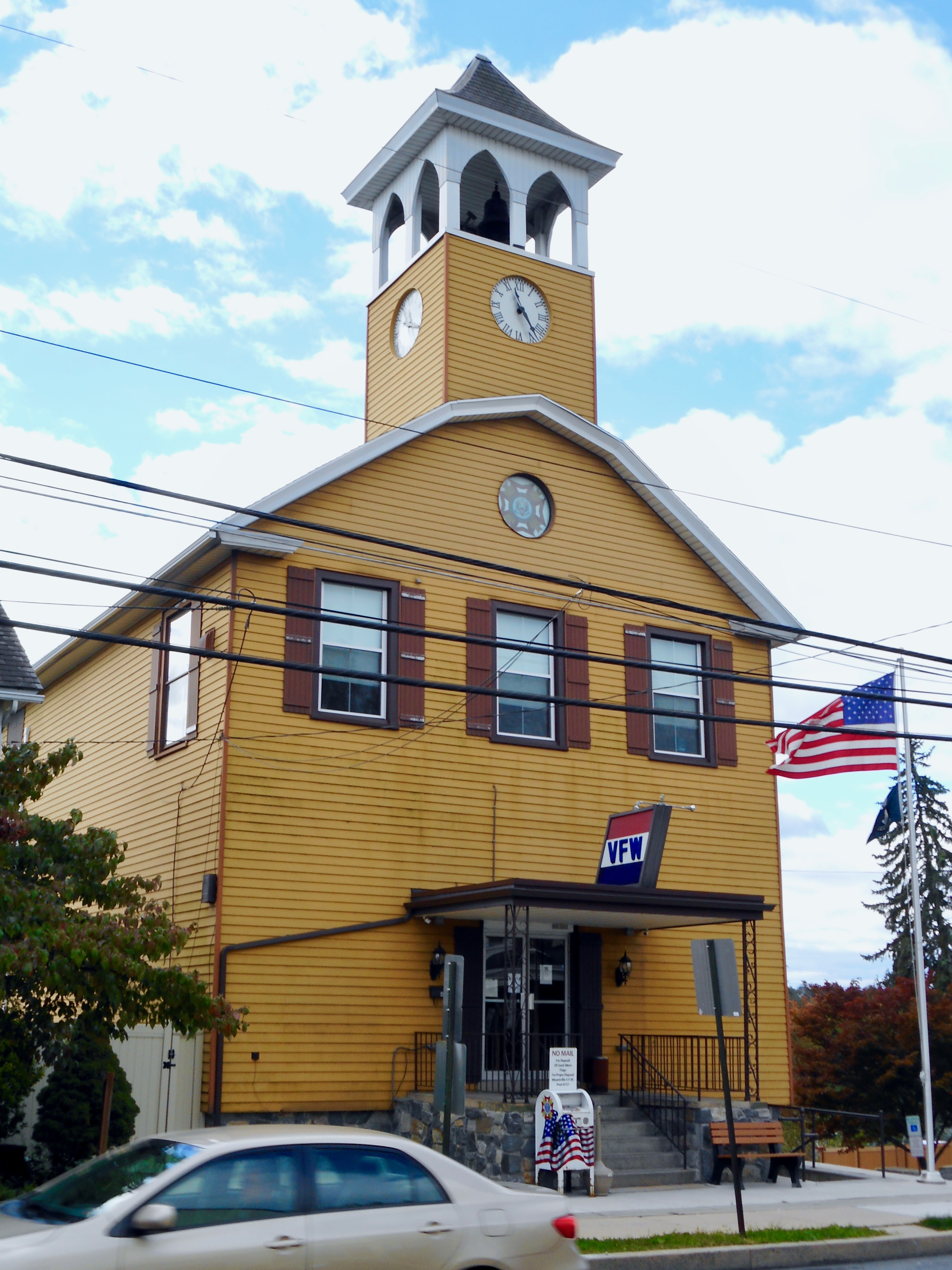
VFW building

== See also ==
- Field of Screams - Horror attraction in Mountville
