= Elias McMellen =

American bridge builder and military officer

Captain Elias McMellen (November 16, 1839 – March 2, 1916) was a bridge-maker and Captain in the Union Army.

McMellen's wife’s name was Annie E. Wenditz (November 13, 1841 – April 1, 1899). They were married on September 21, 1865, and had the following children: Ella, Sara (also known as Sadie), Joseph, Walter and James. Their home for many years was located at 28 East Vine Street, Lancaster, Pennsylvania; he provided a home for his mother next-door.

During the Civil War, McMellen enlisted for service in the Union Army, becoming a private in Co. K, 79th P. V. I., which regiment was assigned to Gen. Negley's brigade. At Perryville, he contracted camp fever through exposure, and was sent home on a furlough. In 1863 he was mustered out of the 79th Regiment on a surgeon's certificate, and the same year, when his health had somewhat recovered, was again received into the service, as first lieutenant of Co. C, 21st Pa. Cavalry. Later, he was appointed captain of the Color Company of the regiment, Co. 1, 21st Pa. Cavalry. Capt. McMellen participated in the last charge made by the Army of the Potomac, on the morning of the surrender of Gen. Robert E. Lee.

When he was twenty years old he built the bridge over Chickies Creek, at Snavely's Mill, and went on to build some of the most celebrated covered bridges in Pennsylvania. In this work of building and contracting he was very successful, and many iron, wooden and stone bridges in Lancaster and adjoining counties were erected by him, his reputation as a bridge builder being second to that of no man in eastern Pennsylvania. He died March 2, 1916, and is interred in the Greenwood Cemetery in Lancaster, Pennsylvania.

== McMellen's bridges ==
- Bucher's Mill Covered Bridge, built in 1891 and rebuilt several times after flood damage. (At only sixty four feet long, it is one of the shortest covered bridges in Lancaster County, Pennsylvania.)
- Forry's Mill Covered Bridge, built in 1869
- Kauffman's Distillery Covered Bridge, built in 1857 and last rebuilt in 1874
- Keller's Mill Covered Bridge, built in 1873, rebuilt in 1891, dismantled in 2006, and reopened on Middle Creek Road in December 2010
- Landis Mill Covered Bridge, built in 1873 (At only fifty three feet long, it is the shortest covered bridge in Lancaster County.)
- Lime Valley Covered Bridge, built in 1871 (Note: This bridge may not have been built by McMellen. See the history of Lime Valley Covered Bridge for more information.)
- Miller's Farm Covered Bridge, built in 1871
  - Willow Hill Covered Bridge, a reconstruction of the above bridge (built in 1962)
- Pine Grove Covered Bridge, built in 1884
- Pinetown Bushong's Mill Covered Bridge, built in 1867, rebuilt by the Amish in 1973, and reopened in January 2014
- Red Run Covered Bridge, built in 1866
- Risser's Mill Covered Bridge, built in 1872 and destroyed by arson on July 8, 2002
- Pool Forge Covered Bridge, built in 1859

== See also ==
- James C. Carpenter, another prolific Lancaster County covered bridge builder
