= Daniel Good's Fording Covered Bridge =

- Coordinates: 40.024210°N 76.201463°W
- Crosses: Pequea Creek
- Locale: Lancaster, Pennsylvania
- Official name: Goods Ford Bridge
- Other name(s): Willow Hill Covered Bridge
- Named for: Daniel Good
- Owner: Adolph Neuber

Characteristics
- Design: Single Burr arch
- Total length: 79 feet (24 m)
- Width: 15 feet (4.6 m)

History
- Constructed by: Levi Fink
- Construction end: 1855
- Construction cost: $1,165.00
- Closed: 1962

The Daniel Good's Fording Covered Bridge was a covered bridge located in Lancaster County, Pennsylvania. It was built in 1855. In 1962 the bridge was used in the construction of the Willow Hill Covered Bridge to supplement the Miller's Farm Covered Bridge from which the Willow Hill covered bridge is derived. It was located on the border between Pequea Township and Providence Township.
