= Little Conestoga Creek =

Tributary of the Conestoga River in Pennsylvania

Coordinates: 40.04857°N 76.34322°W

Little Conestoga Creek is a 21.1-mile-long (34.0 km) tributary of the Conestoga River in Pennsylvania. The Landis Mill Covered Bridge crosses the creek.

The name of the creek comes from the Susquehannock Kanestoge, meaning "at the place of the immersed pole". This was the name of the principal Susquehannock settlement, now Conestoga, Pennsylvania.

== Tributaries ==
- West Branch Little Conestoga Creek
- Brubaker Run

== See also ==
- List of Pennsylvania rivers
