= Muddy Creek (Conestoga River tributary) =

Tributary of the Conestoga River in Lancaster County, Pennsylvania

Coordinates: 40°09′10″N 76°06′58″W

Muddy Creek is a 15.7-mile-long (25.3 km) tributary of the Conestoga River in Lancaster County, Pennsylvania, in the United States.

The tributary Little Muddy Creek joins Muddy Creek 3.7 miles (6.0 km) from the Conestoga River. Muddy Creek joins the Conestoga River 7.5 miles (12.1 km) upstream from Brownstown.

Muddy Creek was formerly spanned by the Red Run Covered Bridge.

== See also ==
- List of rivers of Pennsylvania
