= Willow Hill Covered Bridge =

Covered bridge in Pennsylvania, US

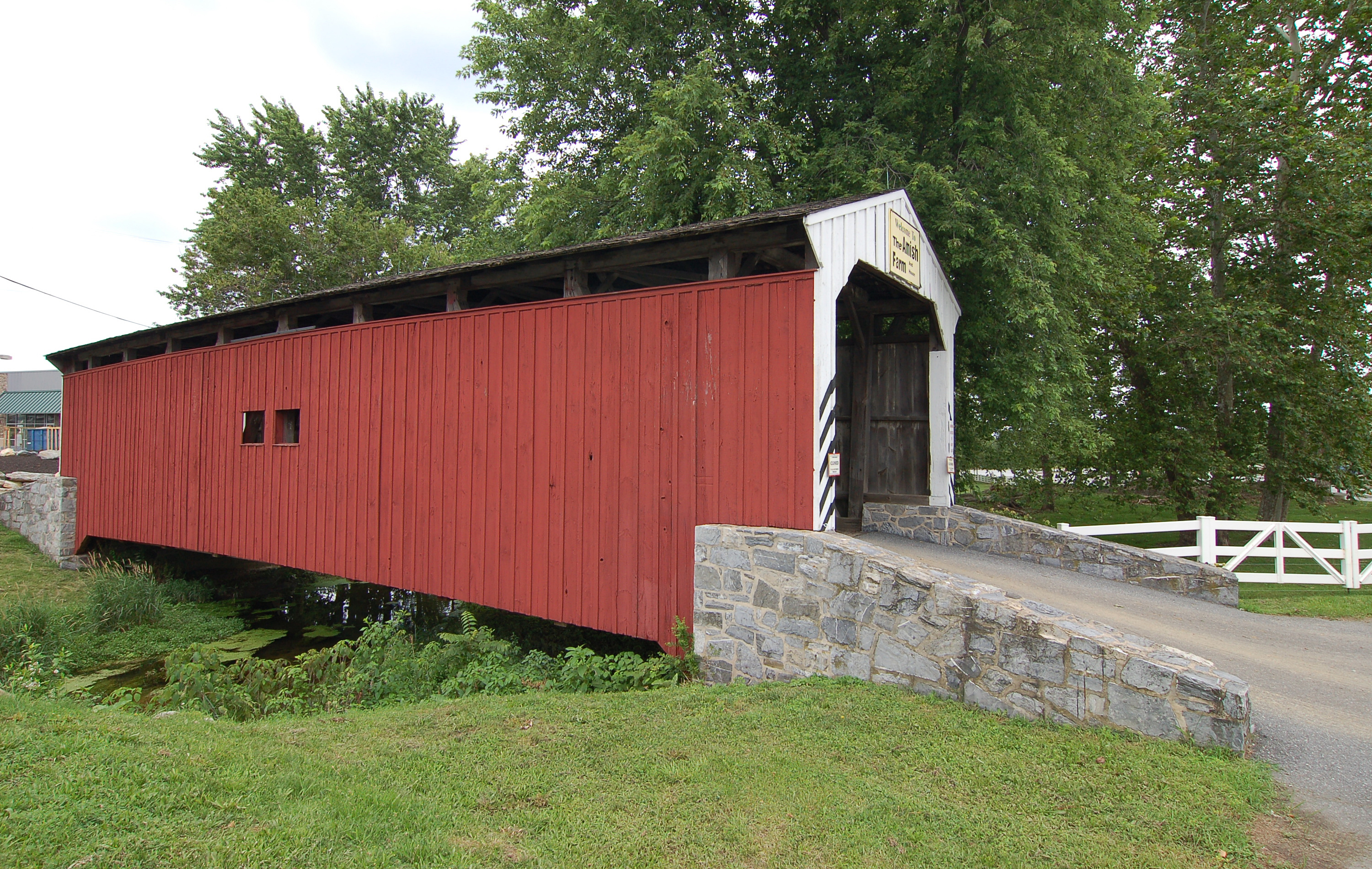
- Coordinates: 40.0250°N 76.2033°W
- Locale: Lancaster County, Pennsylvania, United States

Characteristics
- Design: single span, double Burr arch truss
- Total length: 93 feet (28.3 m)

History
- Constructed by: Roy Zimmerman
- Construction start: 1962

Location
- Interactive map of Willow Hill Covered Bridge

The Willow Hill Covered Bridge is a covered bridge located off U.S. Route 30 that spans Miller’s Run (which flows into Mill Creek, a tributary of the Conestoga River) in Lancaster County, Pennsylvania, United States. It was built in 1962 by Roy Zimmerman as a reconstruction using parts of the Miller's Farm Covered Bridge, built in 1871 by Elias McMellen, and Good's Fording Covered Bridge, built in 1855. It crosses Miller's Run and is 93 feet (28 m) long and 15 feet (4.6 m) wide.

The bridge has a single span, wooden, double Burr arch trusses design with the addition of steel hanger rods. It is painted red, the traditional color of Lancaster County covered bridges, on the outside. The inside is unpainted. Both approaches to the bridge are painted in the traditional white color.

The bridge's WGCB Number is 38-36-43. Because it was constructed from two historic covered bridges, it is not listed on the National Register of Historic Places like most of the other covered bridges in the county. It is located at 40°1′30″N 76°12′11.9″W.

== Dimensions ==
- Length: 93 feet (28.3 m) total length
- Width: 15 feet (4.6 m) total width

== Gallery ==
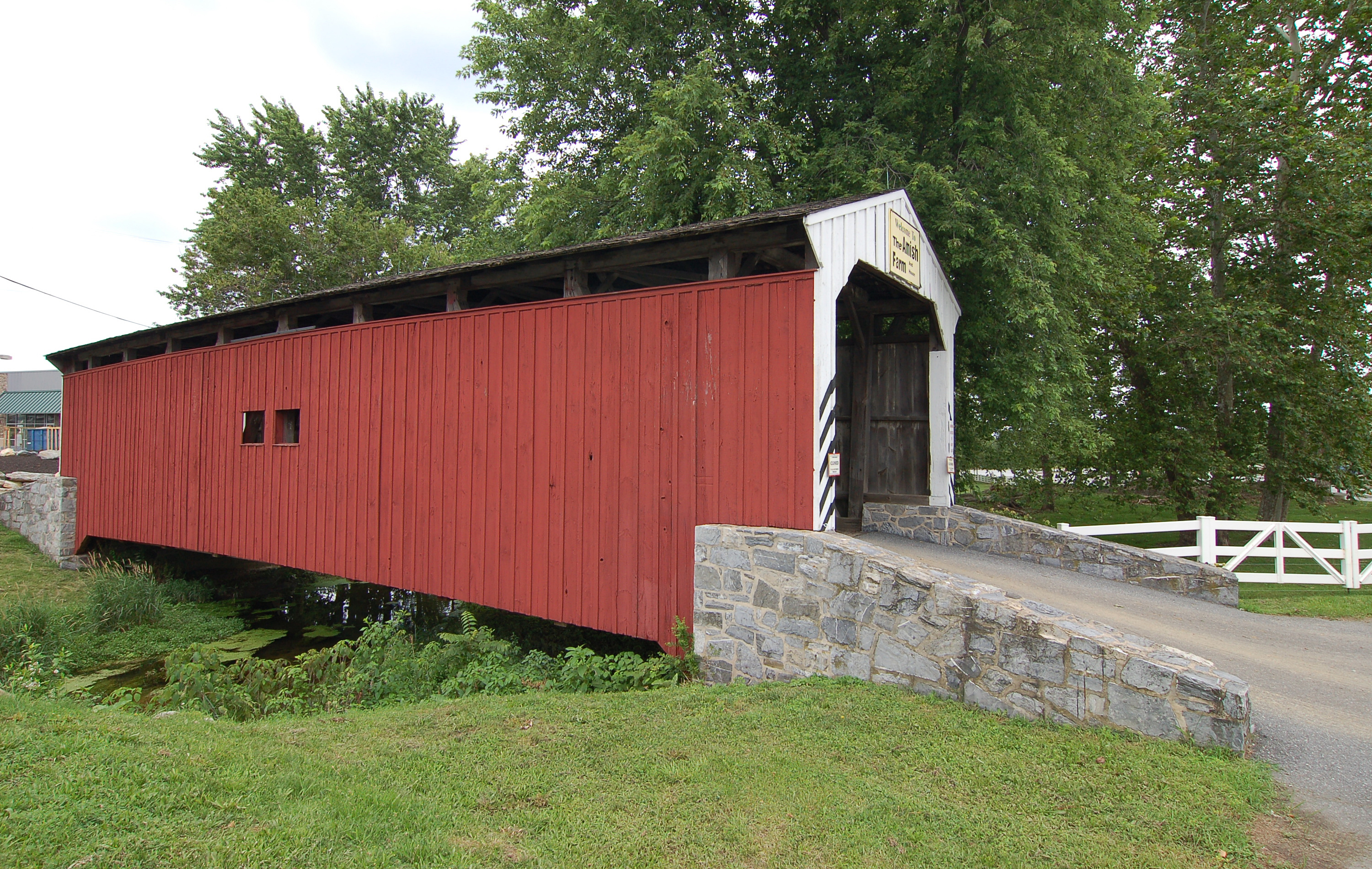

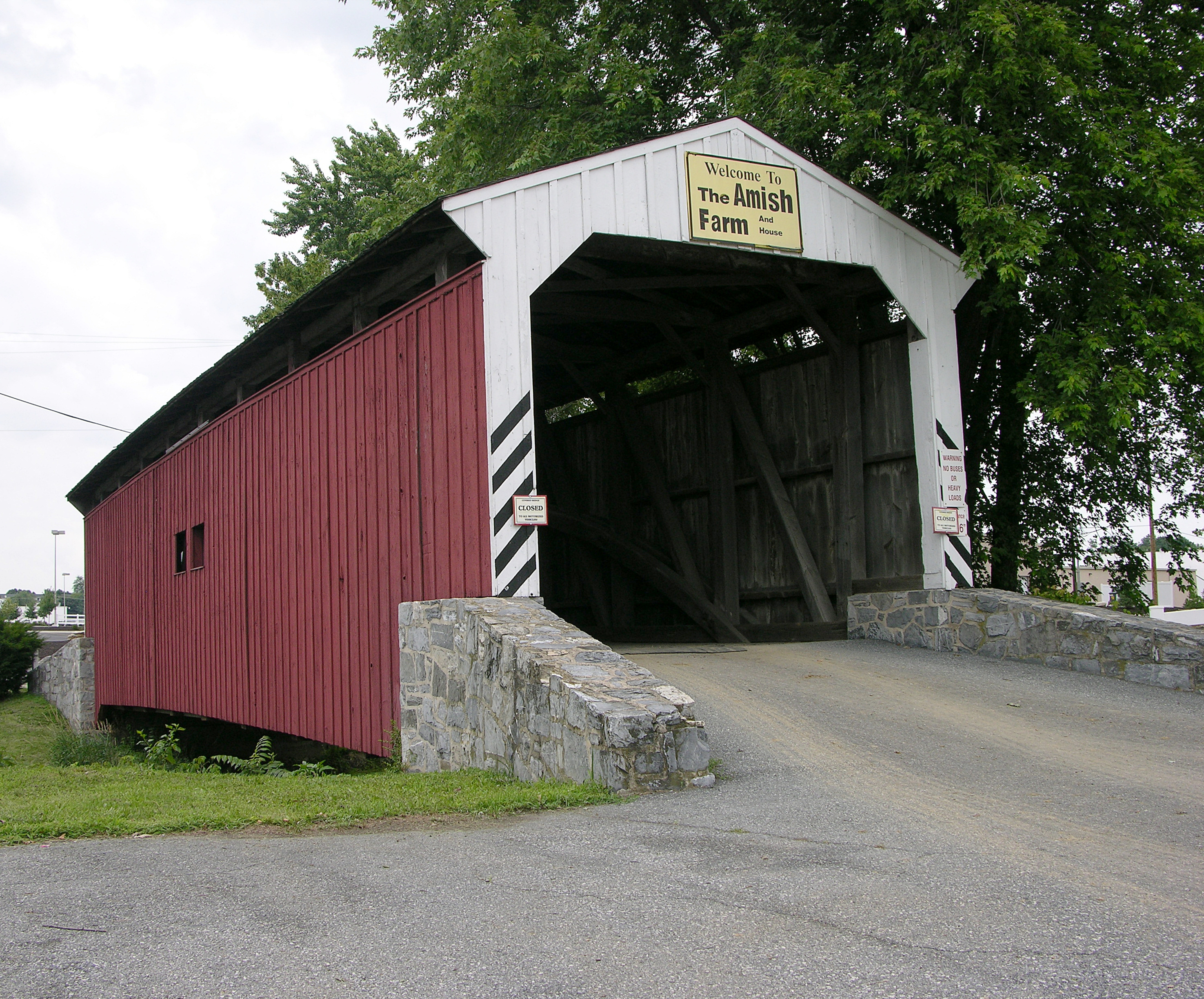

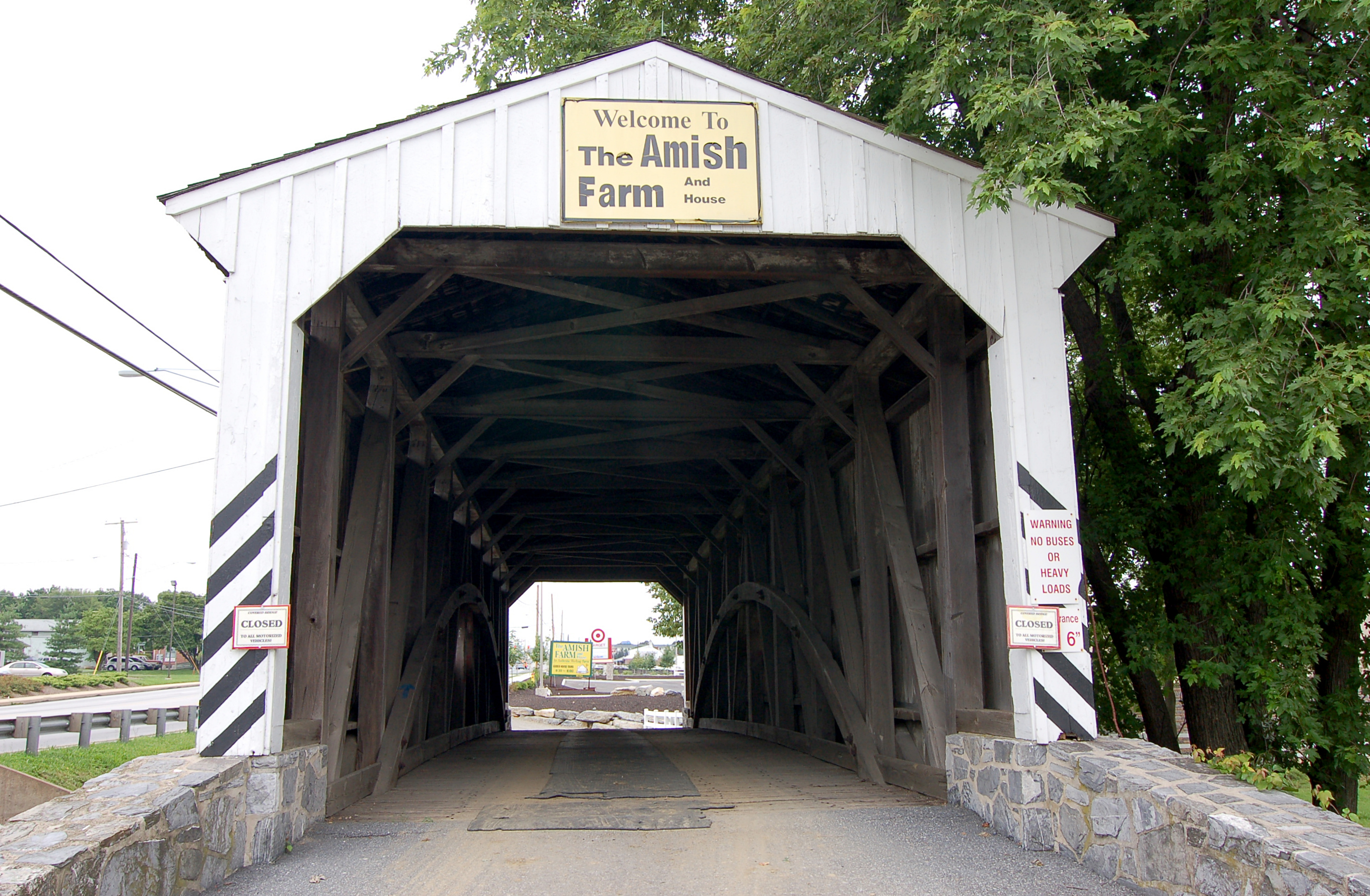

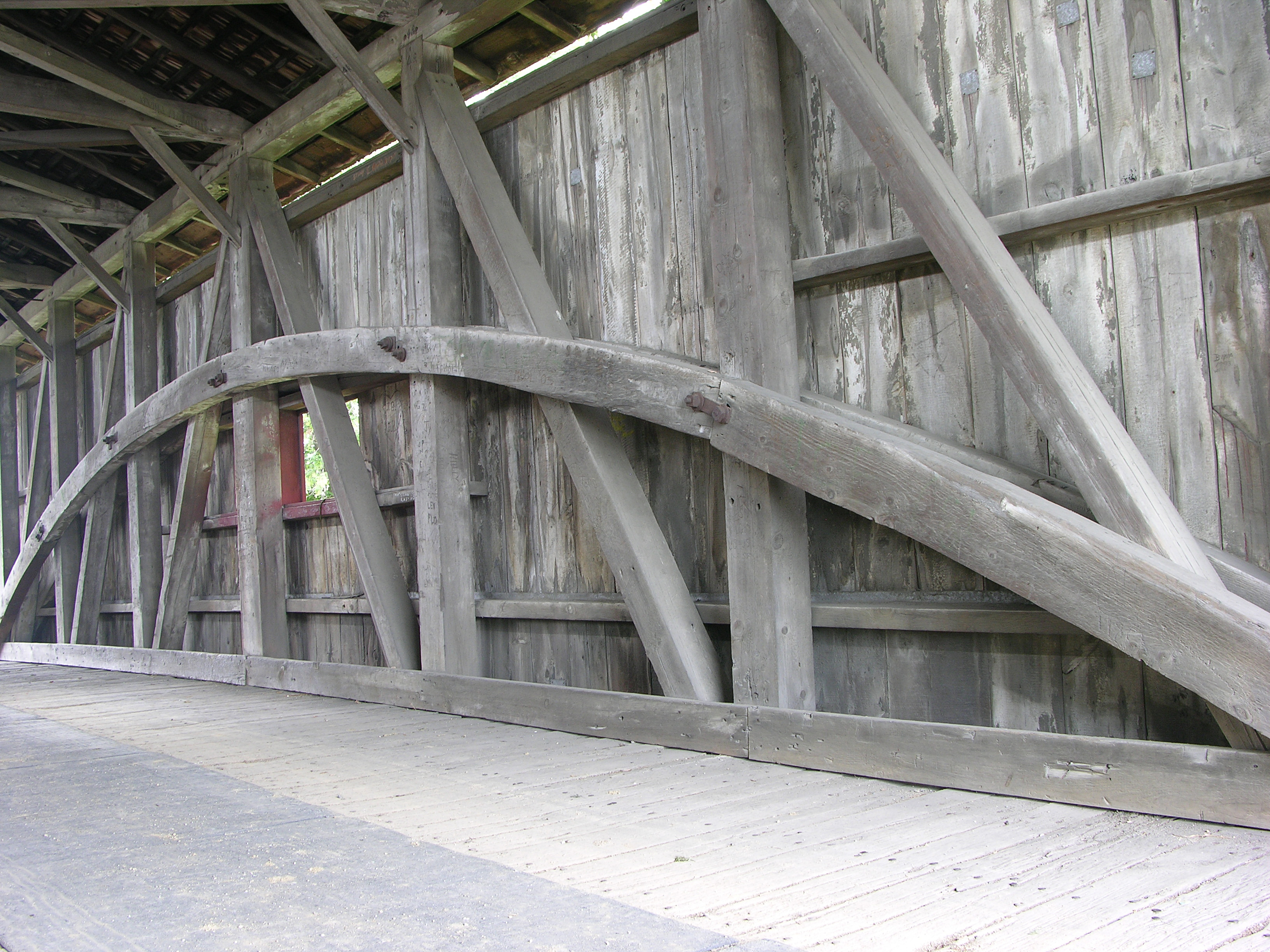

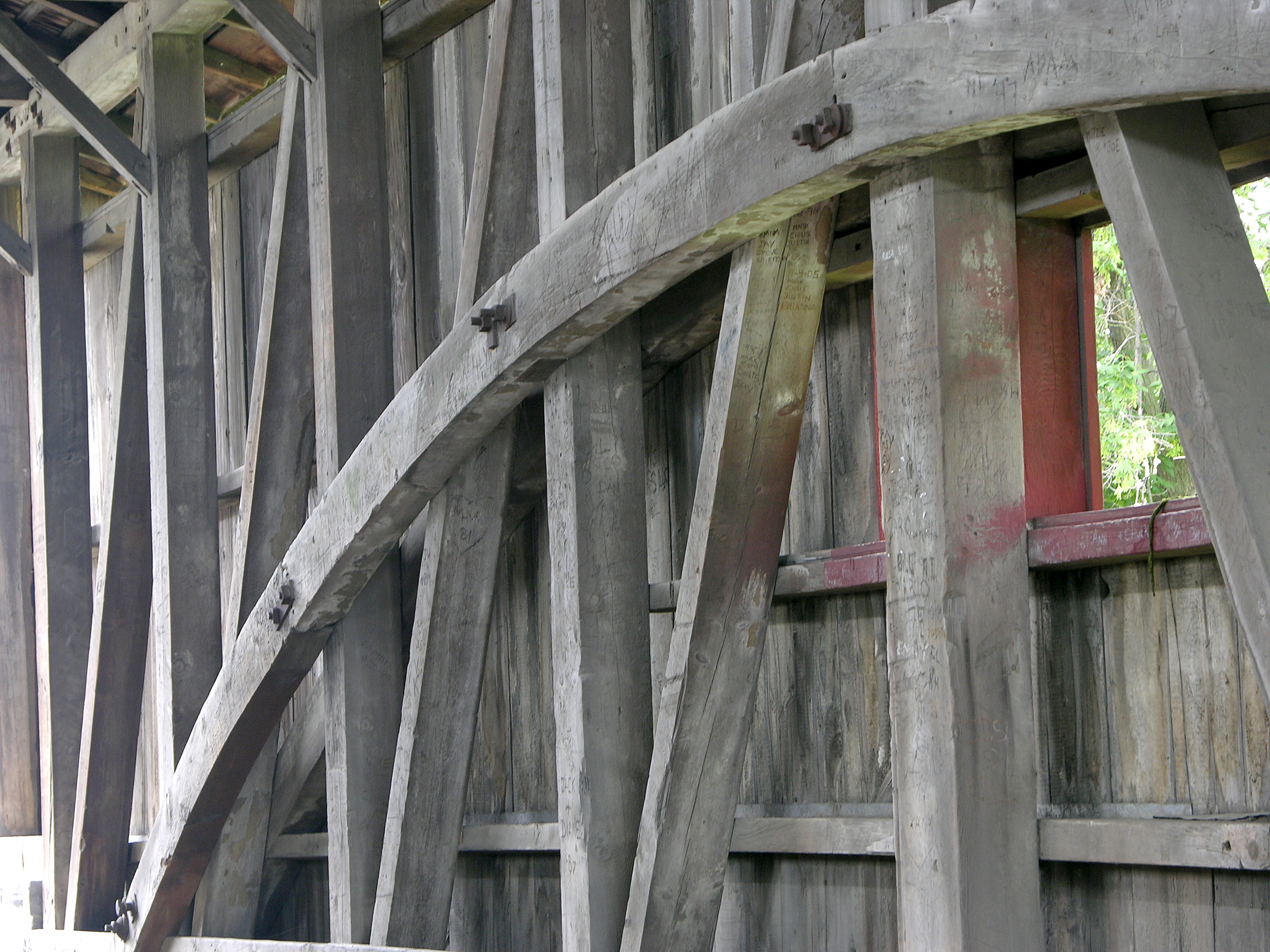

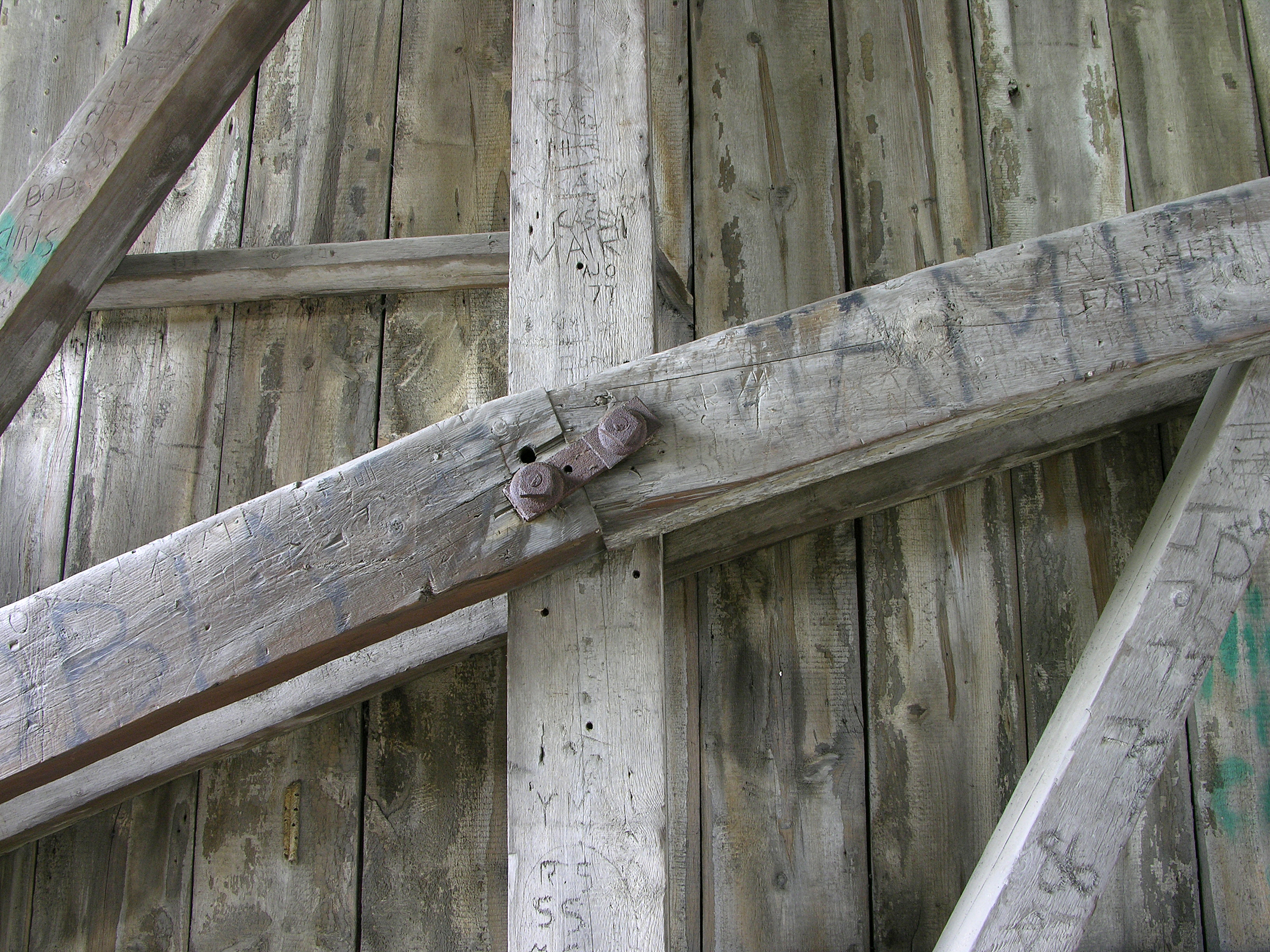

== See also ==
- Burr arch truss
- List of Lancaster County covered bridges
