= Red Run Covered Bridge =

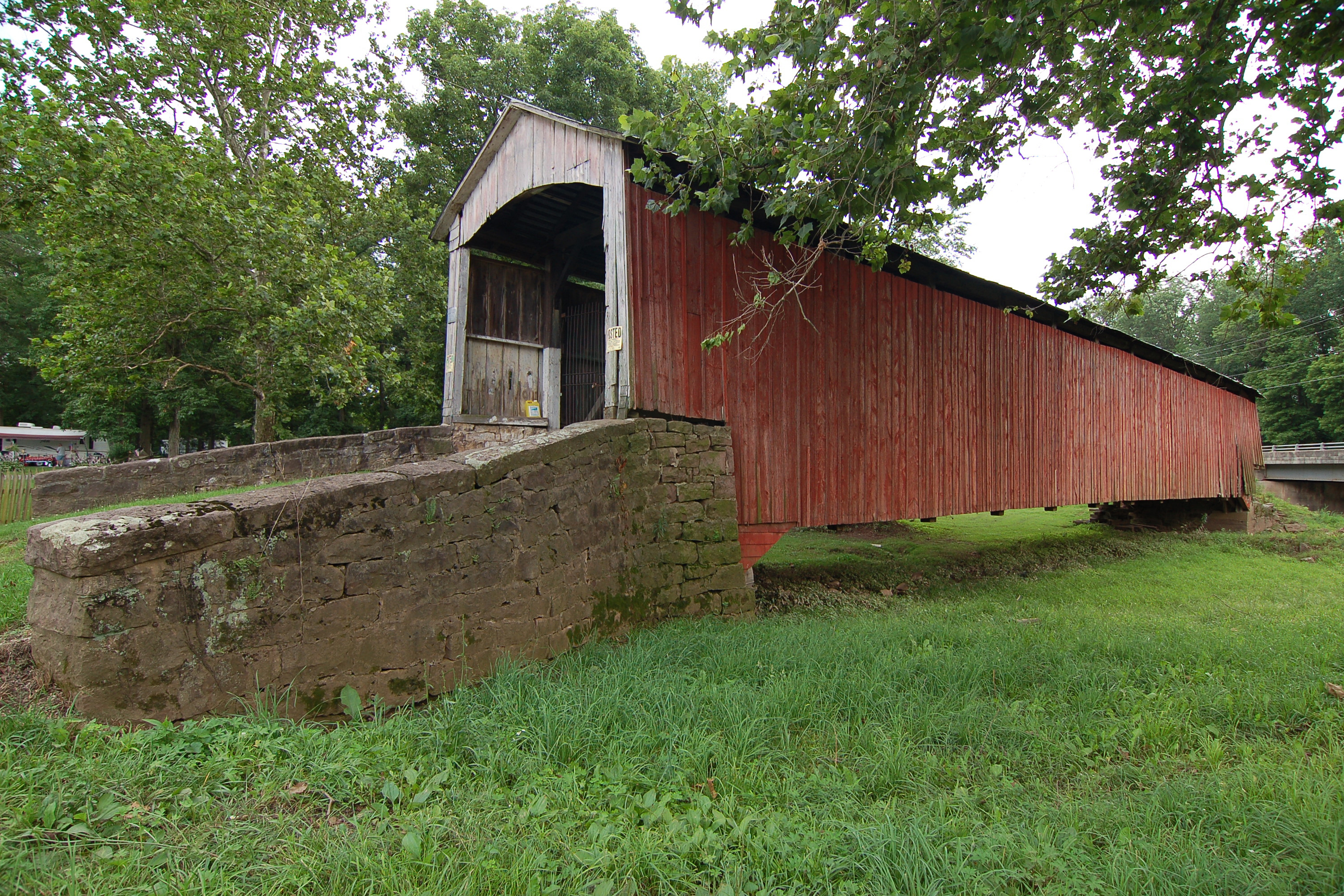
- Coordinates: 40.1762°N 76.0833°W
- Locale: Lancaster County, Pennsylvania, United States

Characteristics
- Design: single span, double Burr arch truss
- Total length: 107 feet (32.6 m)

History
- Constructed by: Elias McMellen
- Construction start: 1866
- Red Run Covered Bridge
- U.S. National Register of Historic Places
- MPS: Covered Bridges of Lancaster County TR
- NRHP reference No.: 80003539
- Added to NRHP: December 11, 1980

Location
- Interactive map of Red Run Covered Bridge

The Red Run Covered Bridge or Oberhaltzer's Covered Bridge is a covered bridge that once spanned the Muddy Creek in Lancaster County, Pennsylvania, United States. It was built in 1866 by Elias McMellen and is currently situated on private property next to the Red Run Campground. It is 107 feet long with a width of 15 feet and is also known as the Oberholzer's Covered Bridge.

The bridge has a single span, wooden, double Burr arch trusses design. It is painted red, the traditional color of Lancaster County covered bridges, on the outside. Both approaches to the bridge are painted in the traditional white color.

The 107 foot long Red Run Covered Bridge is located at Red Run Campground and is on private property but it can easily be seen from the road. Built in 1866, this covered bridge is being used as a storage unit, this could be called a covered bridge to nowhere because the waters of Muddy Creek were diverted around the covered bridge in such a way that no water flows under its peers, another reason why this could be called a covered bridge to nowhere is because this covered bridge was replaced with a concrete span in 1961, a landlocked covered bridge is an ominous sight, and it can be imagined ghosts haunt here on Halloween.

The bridge's WGCB Number is 38-36-10. Added in 1980, it is listed on the National Register of Historic Places as structure number 80003539. It is located at 40°10′34.2″N 76°5′0″W (40.17617, -76.08333).

== Dimensions ==
- Length: 107 feet (32.6 m) length or 128 feet (39 m) total length
- Width: 15 feet (4.6 m) total width

== Gallery ==
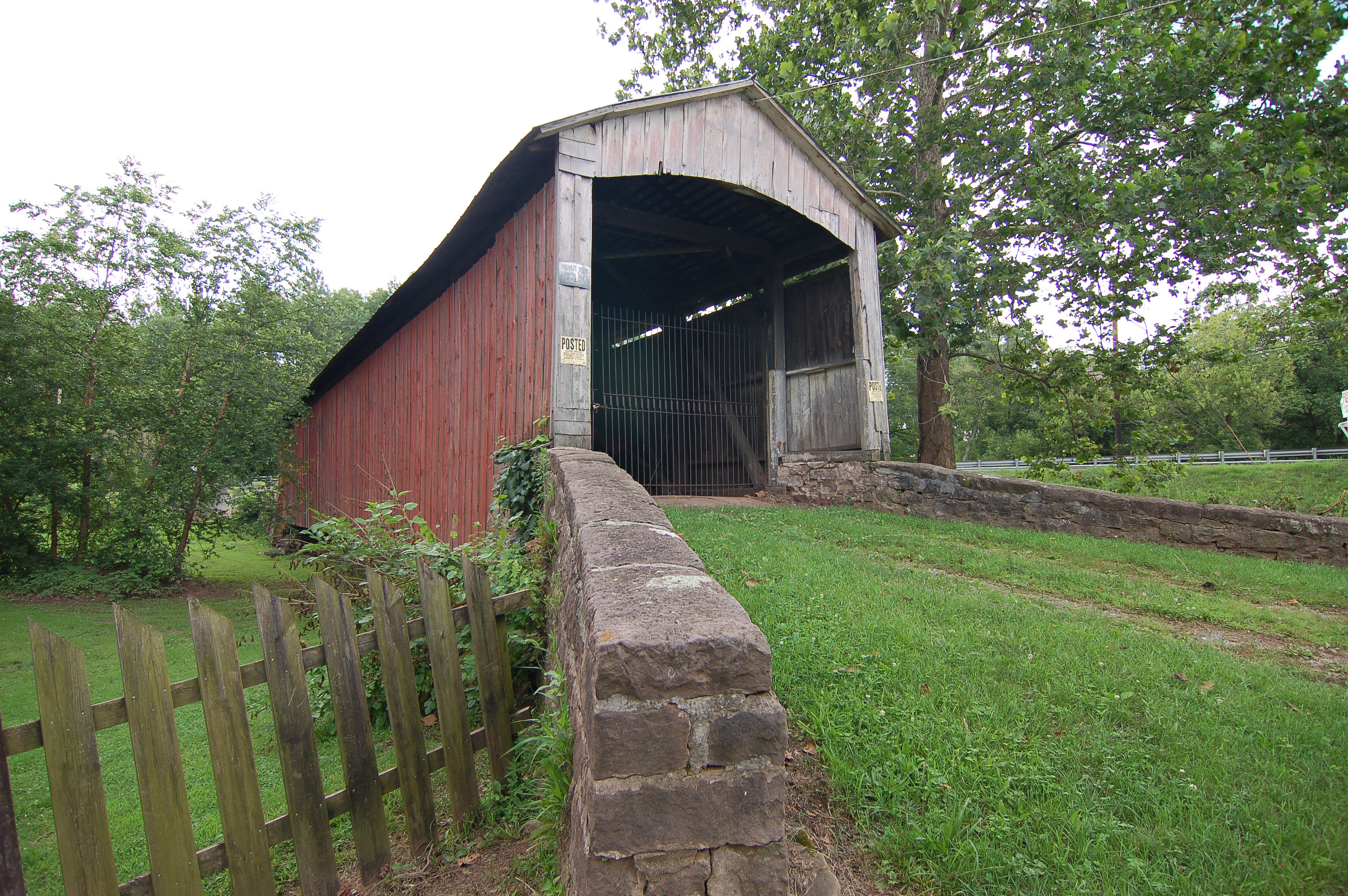
View of the front of the bridge

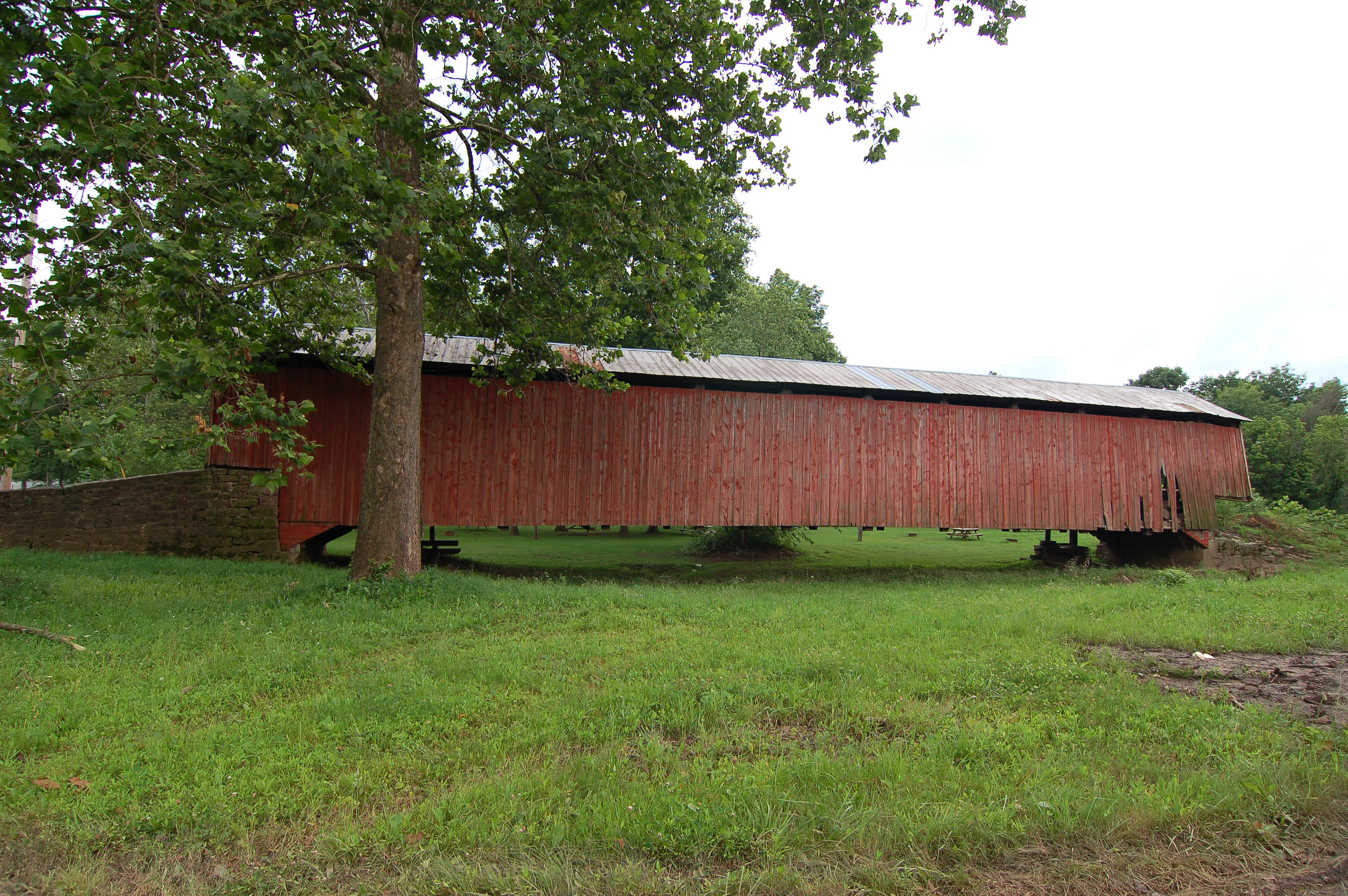
Side of the bridge

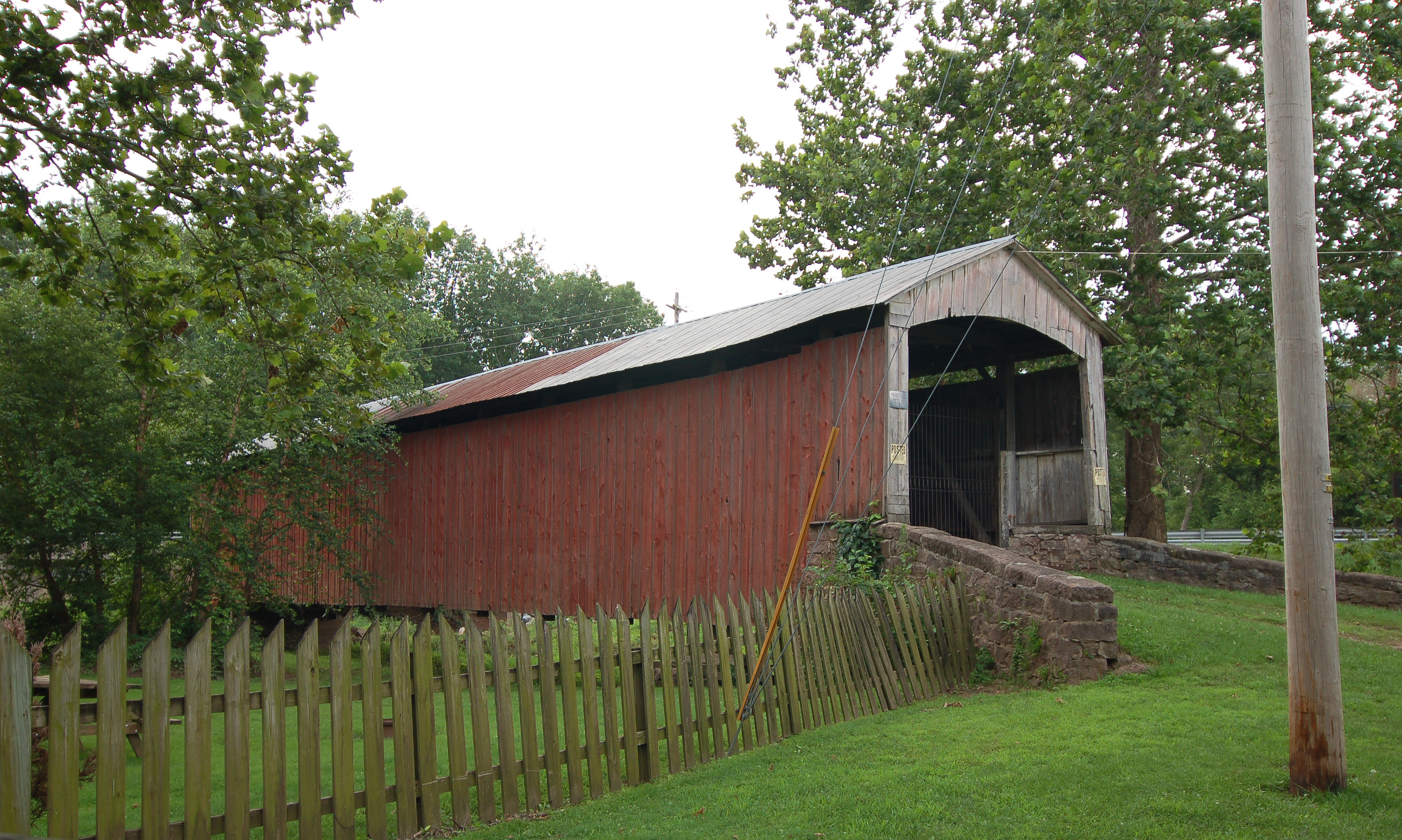
A three quarters view

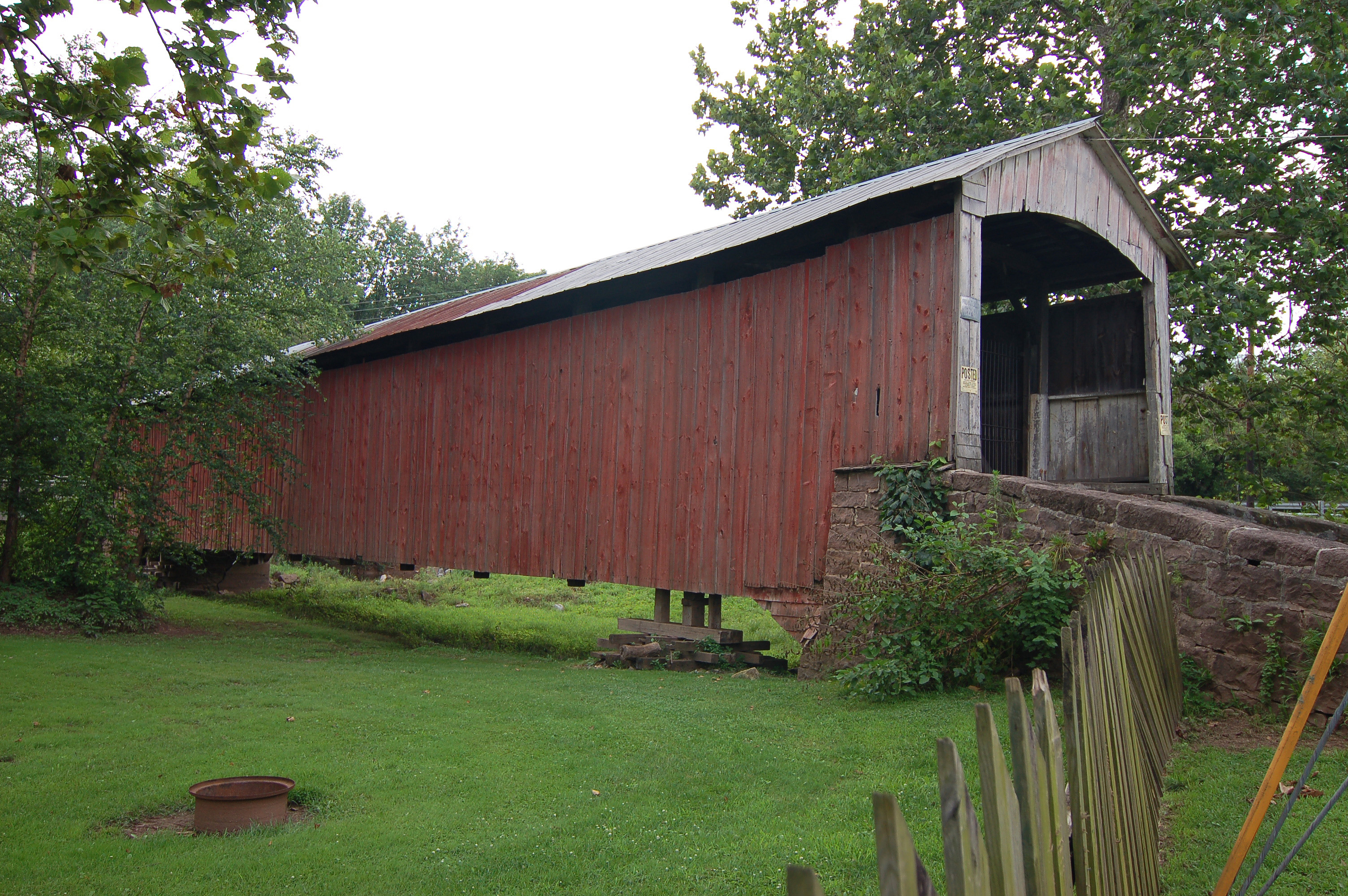
A closer view

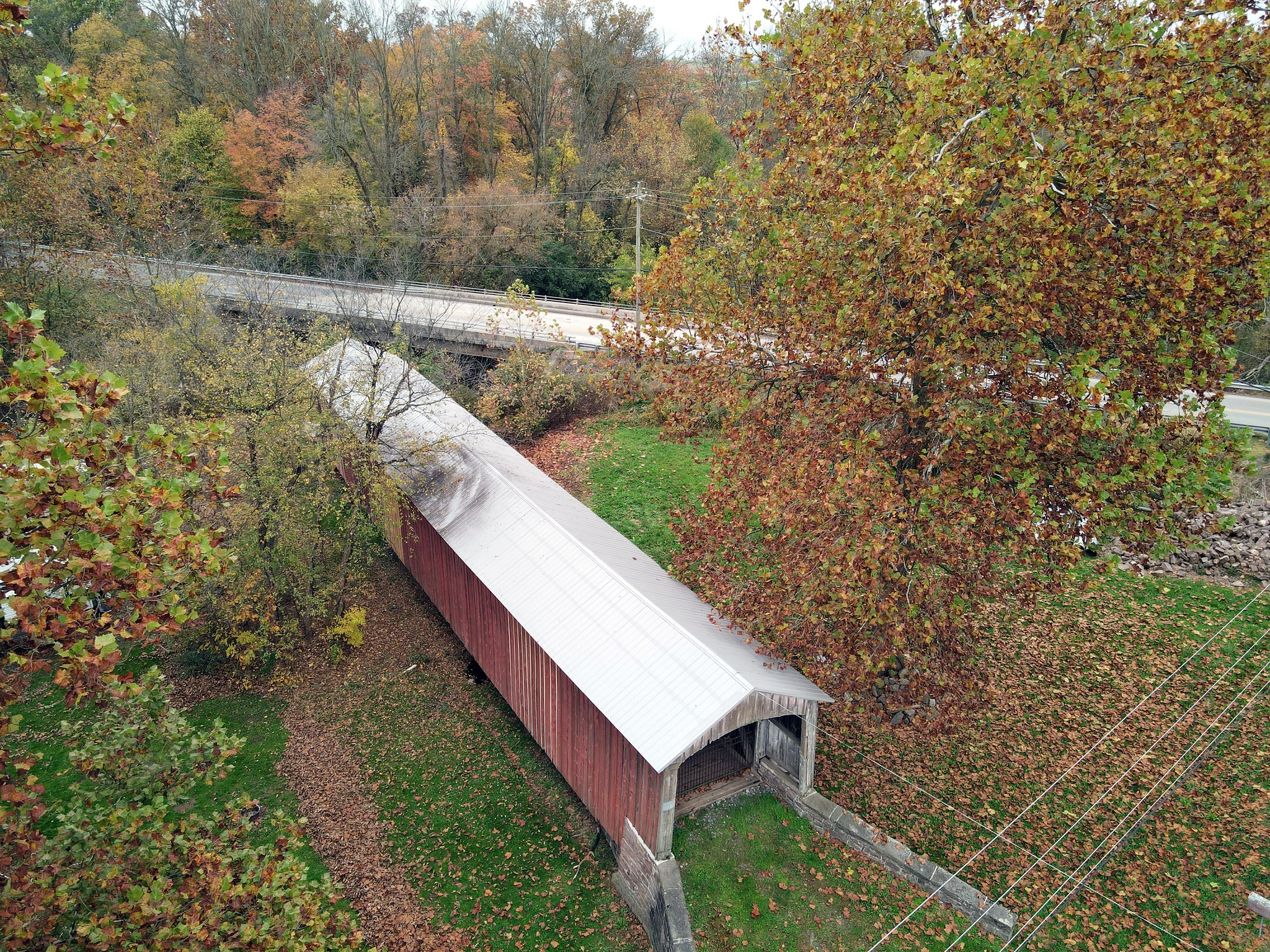
View from above towards river

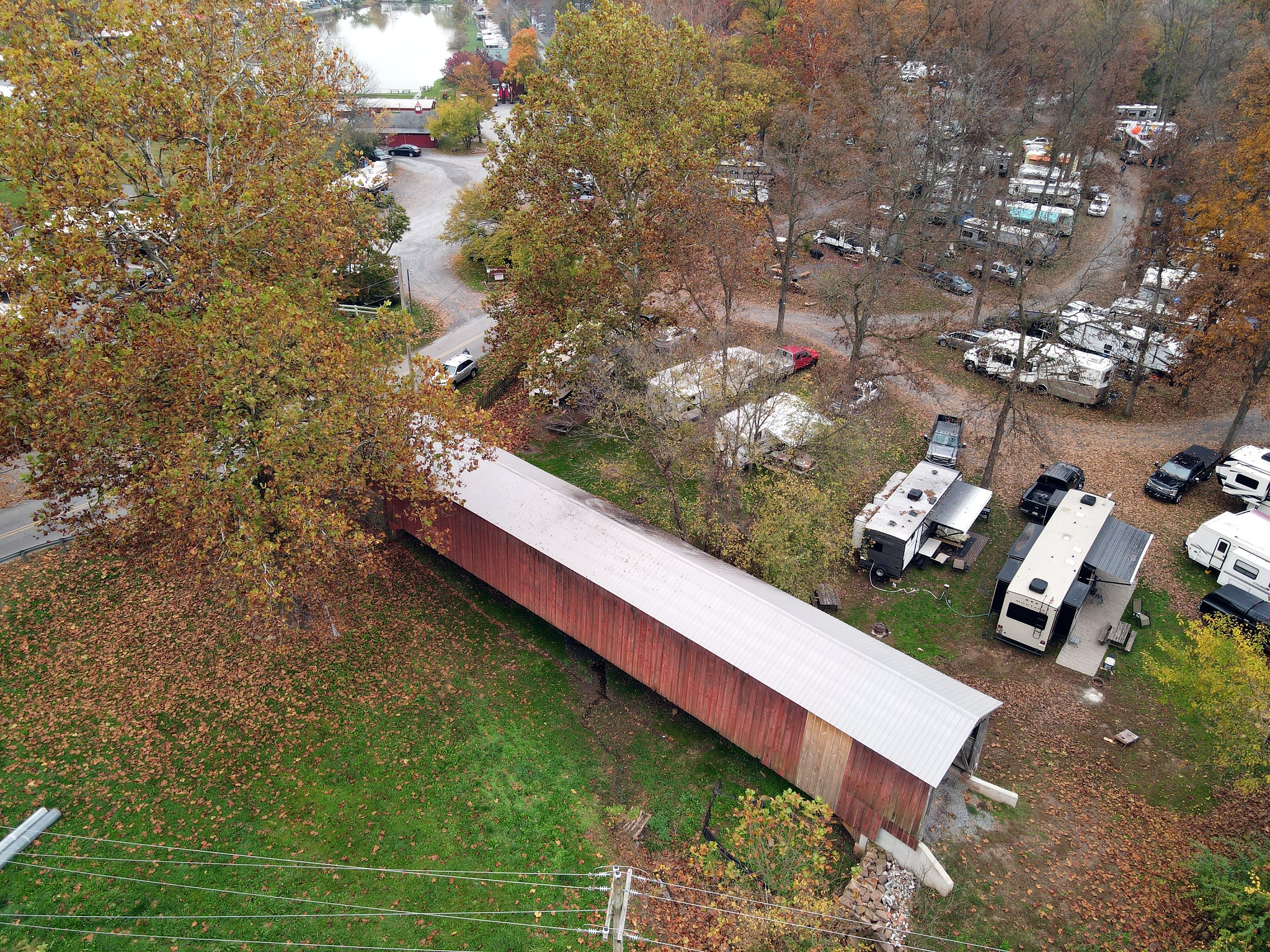
View from above towards campground

== See also ==
- Burr arch truss
- List of Lancaster County covered bridges
