= Lime Valley Covered Bridge =

Covered bridge

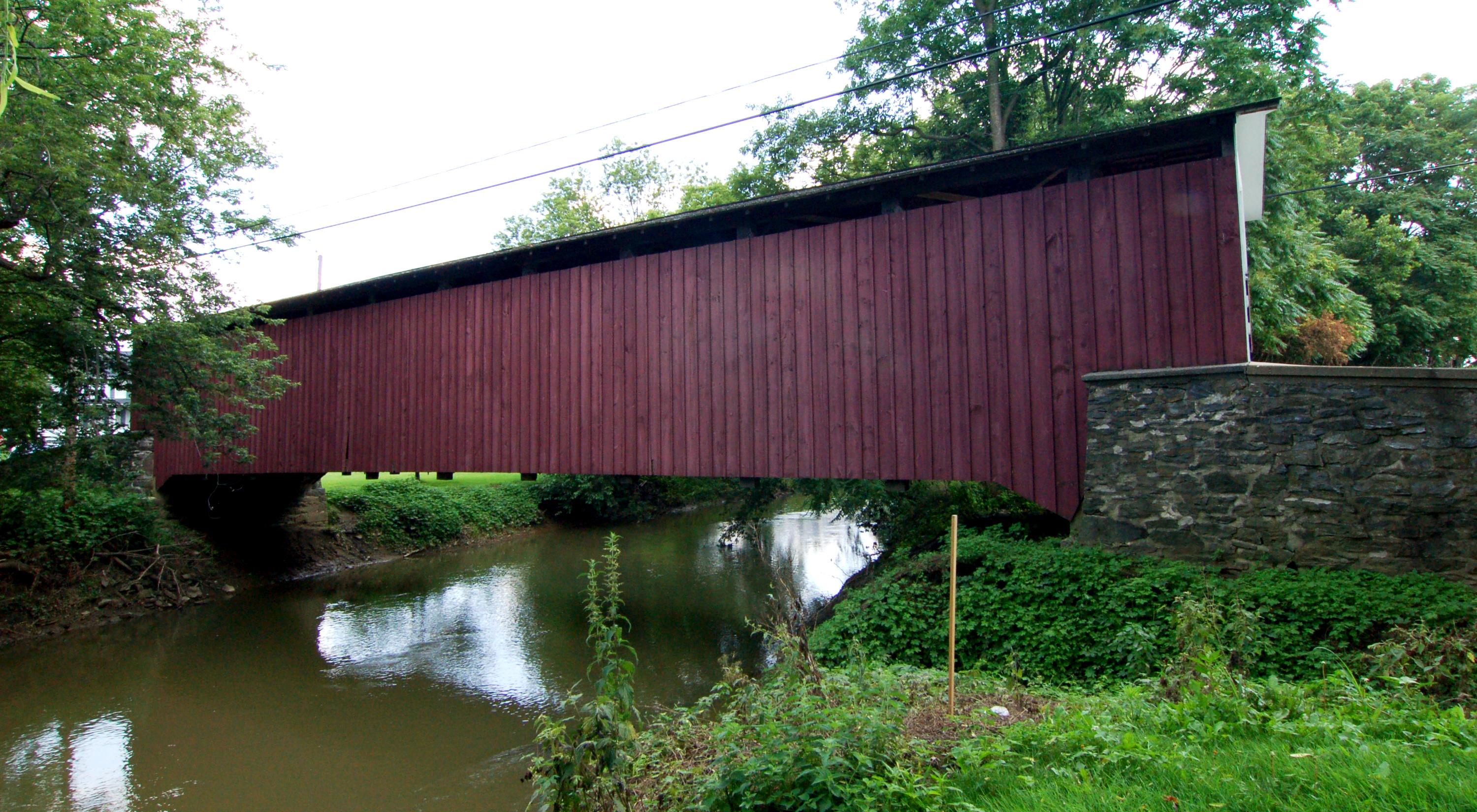
- Coordinates: 39.9607°N 76.2350°W
- Locale: Lancaster County, Pennsylvania, United States
- Official name: Pequea #8 Bridge

Characteristics
- Design: single span, double Burr arch truss
- Total length: 103 feet (31.4 m)

History
- Constructed by: Either Joseph Cramer or Elias McMellen
- Construction start: 1871
- Lime Valley Covered Bridge
- U.S. National Register of Historic Places
- MPS: Covered Bridges of Lancaster County TR
- NRHP reference No.: 80003535
- Added to NRHP: December 10, 1980

Location
- Interactive map of Lime Valley Covered Bridge

The Lime Valley Covered Bridge or Strasburg Bridge is a covered bridge that spans Pequea Creek in Lancaster County, Pennsylvania, United States. A county-owned and maintained bridge, its official designation is the Pequea #8 Bridge.

The bridge has a single span, wooden, double Burr arch trusses design with the addition of steel hanger rods. The deck is made from oak planks. It is painted red, the traditional color of Lancaster County covered bridges, on both the inside and outside. Both approaches to the bridge are painted in the traditional white color.

The bridge's WGCB Number is 38-36-23. Added in 1980, it is listed on the National Register of Historic Places as structure number 80003535. It is located at 39°57′38.4″N 76°14′6″W (39.96067, -76.23500). The bridge is close to U.S. Route 222 southeast of Willow Street in West Lampeter Township, Pennsylvania. From 222 the bridge is 0.35 miles (0.56 km) east on Lime Valley Road, 0.3 miles (0.48 km) south on South View Road, and 250 feet (76 m) on Breneman Road.

== History ==
It was built in 1871 by either Joseph Cramer or Elias McMellen at a cost of $3,500. The bridge was a twin to another covered bridge built in 1857 by Silas Wolverton that was located 200 ft (61 m) to the west of the Lime Valley Covered Bridge.

== Dimensions ==
- Length: 93 feet (28.3 m) span and 103 feet (31 m) total length
- Width: 13 (4.0 m) clear deck and 15 feet (4.6 m) total width
- Overhead clearance: 12 feet (3.7 m)
- Underclearance: 3 to 11 feet (0.91 to 3.35 m)

== Gallery ==
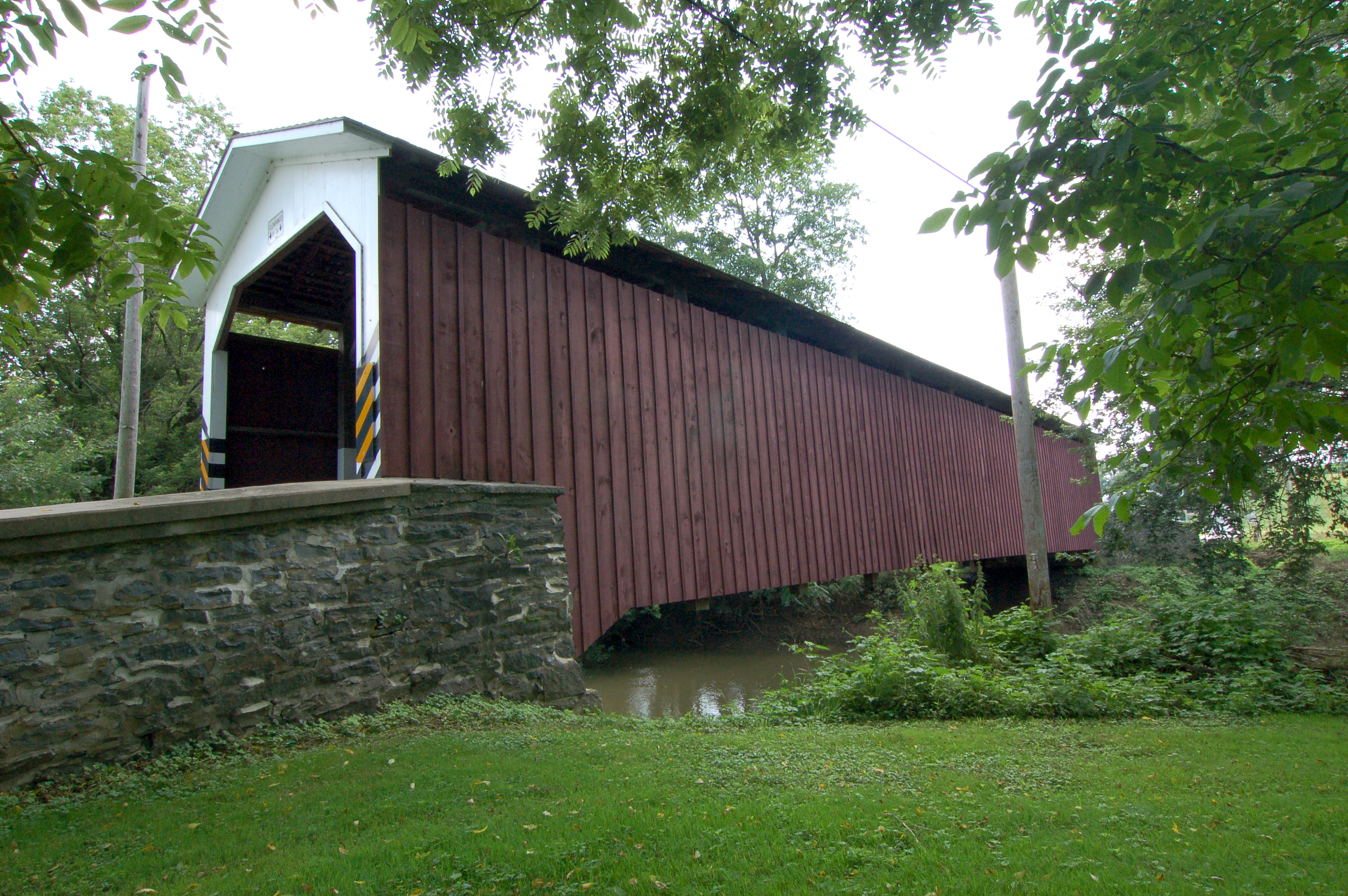
Three quarters view

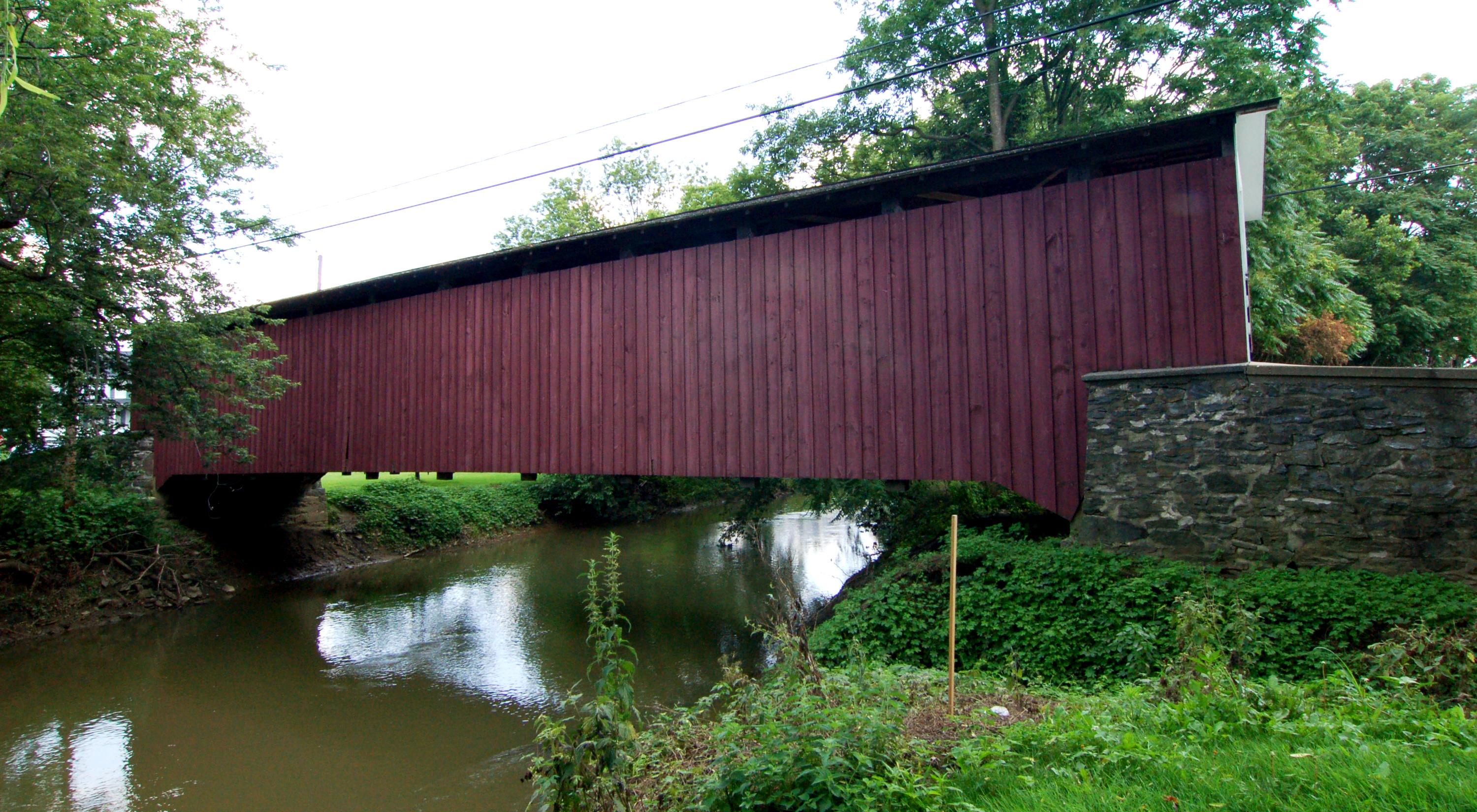
Side view

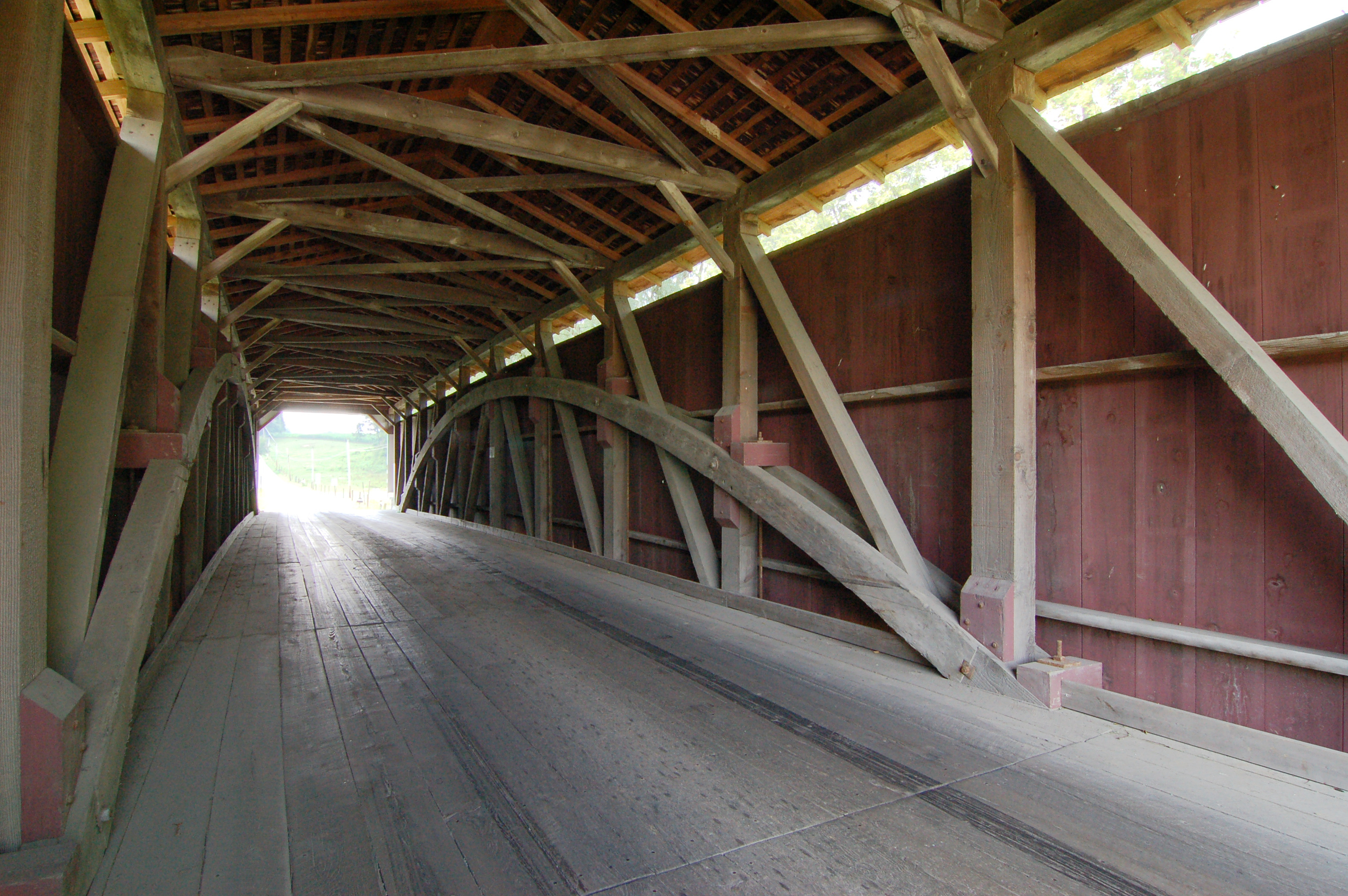
Inside view of the Burr arch truss design

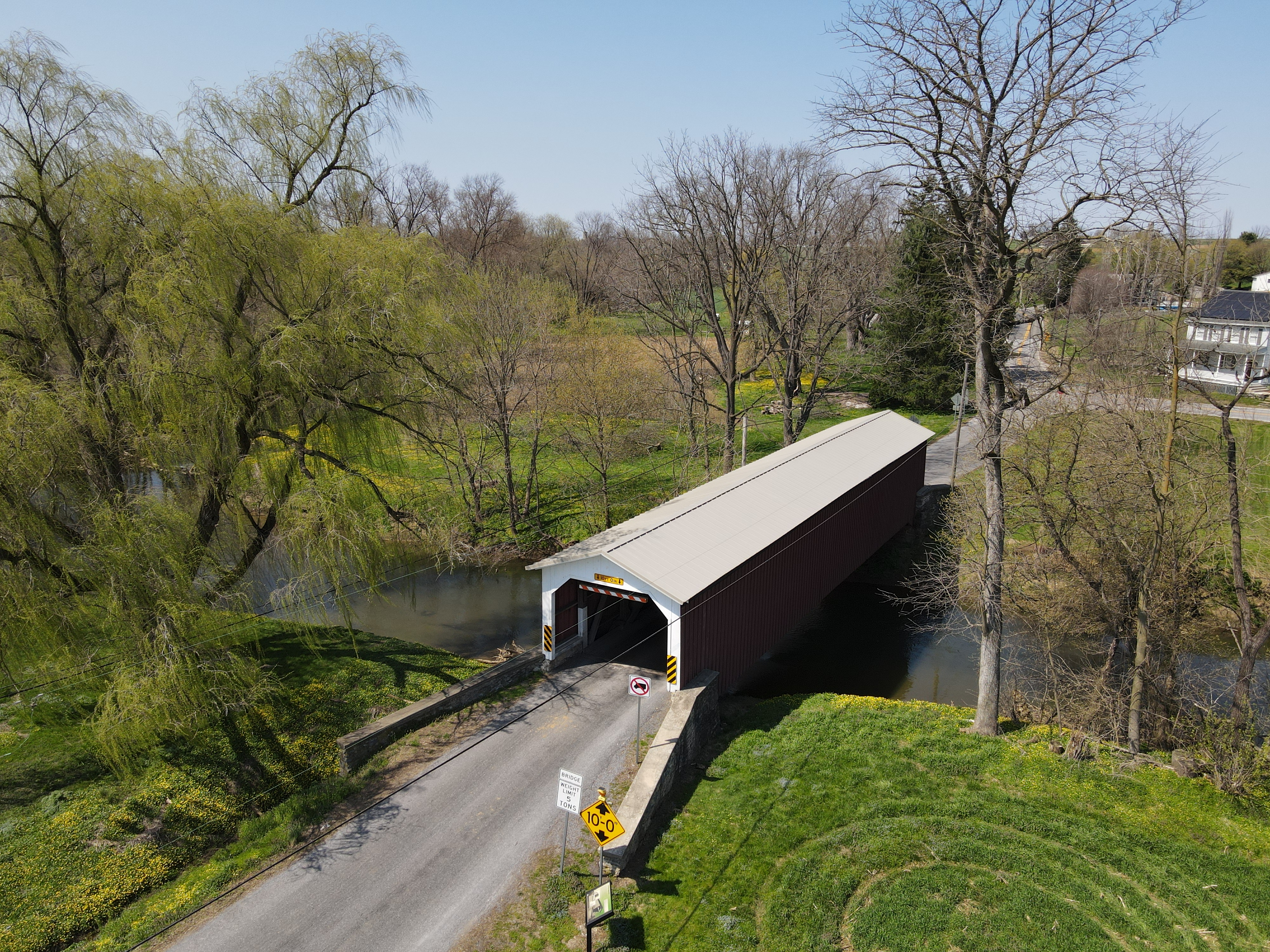
Three quarters view from the air

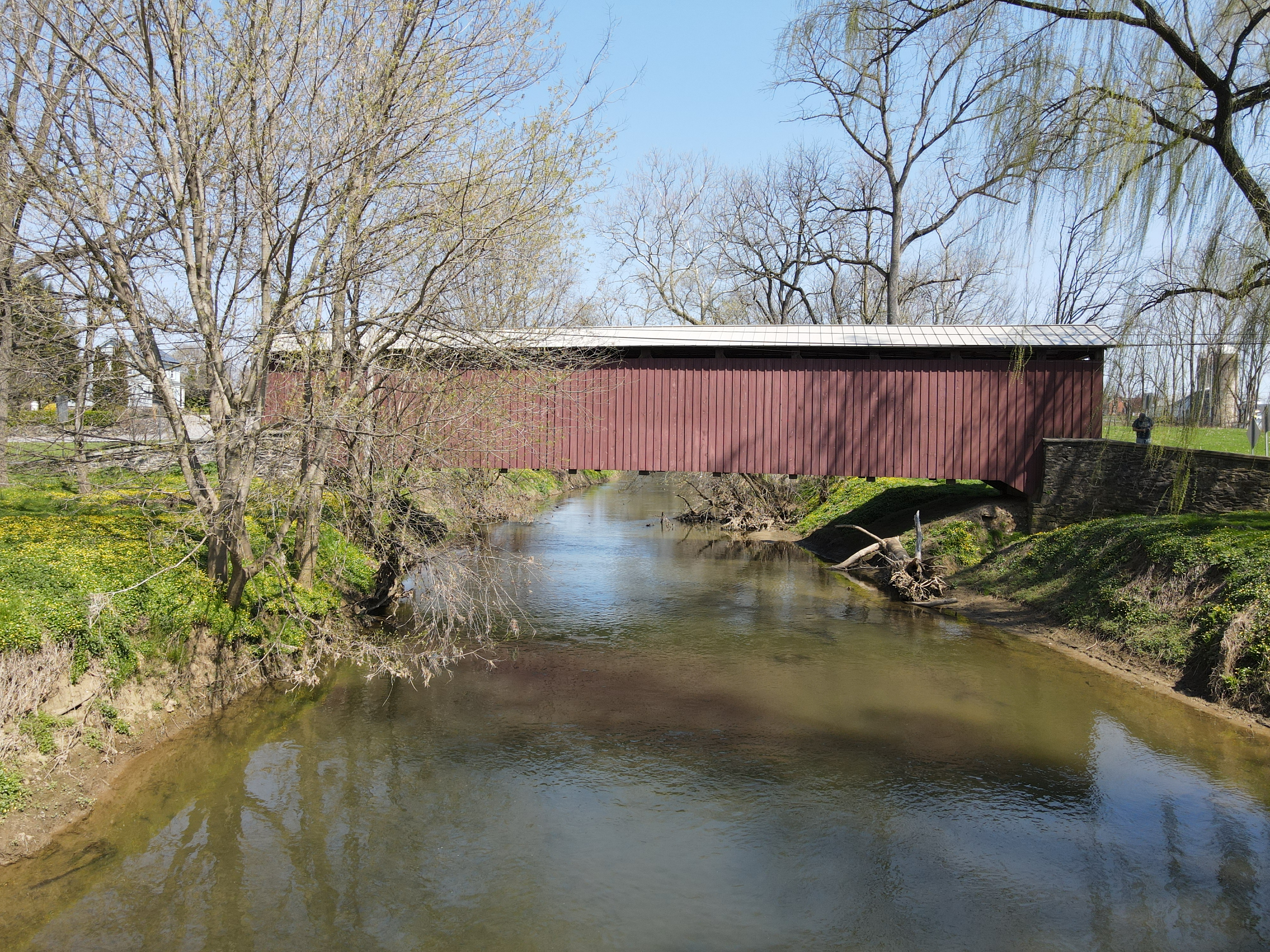
Side view from the air

== See also ==
- Burr arch truss
- List of Lancaster County covered bridges
