= Risser's Mill Covered Bridge =

- Formerly listed on the U.S. National Register of Historic Places
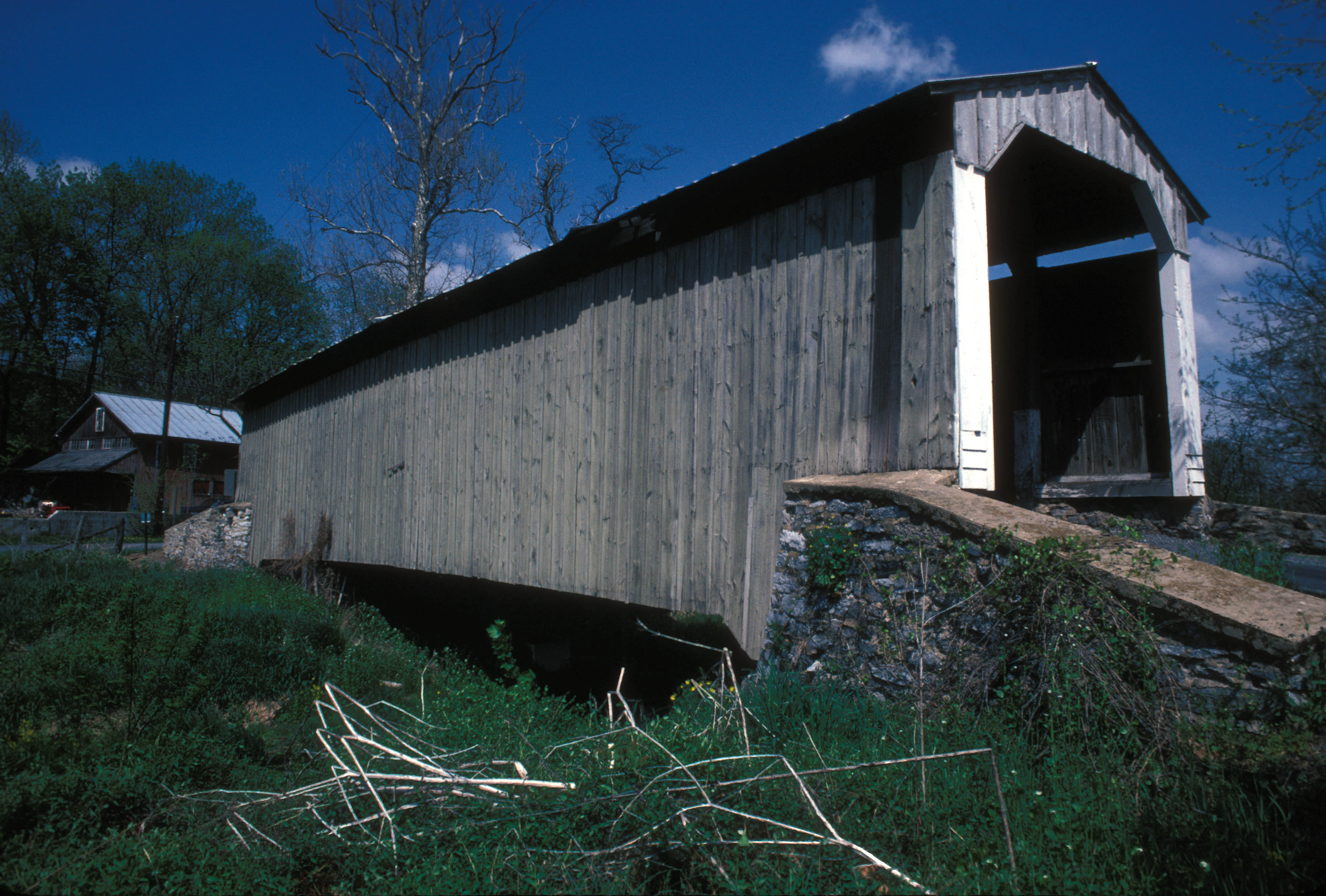

- Location within Pennsylvania Location within the United States
- Nearest city: Mount Joy, Pennsylvania
- Coordinates: 40.1393°N 76.5048°W
- Area: 0.1 acres (0.040 ha)
- Built: 1872
- Architectural style: Burr arch
- MPS: Covered Bridges of Lancaster County TR
- NRHP reference No.: 80004612

Significant dates
- Added to NRHP: December 10, 1980
- Removed from NRHP: December 05, 2003

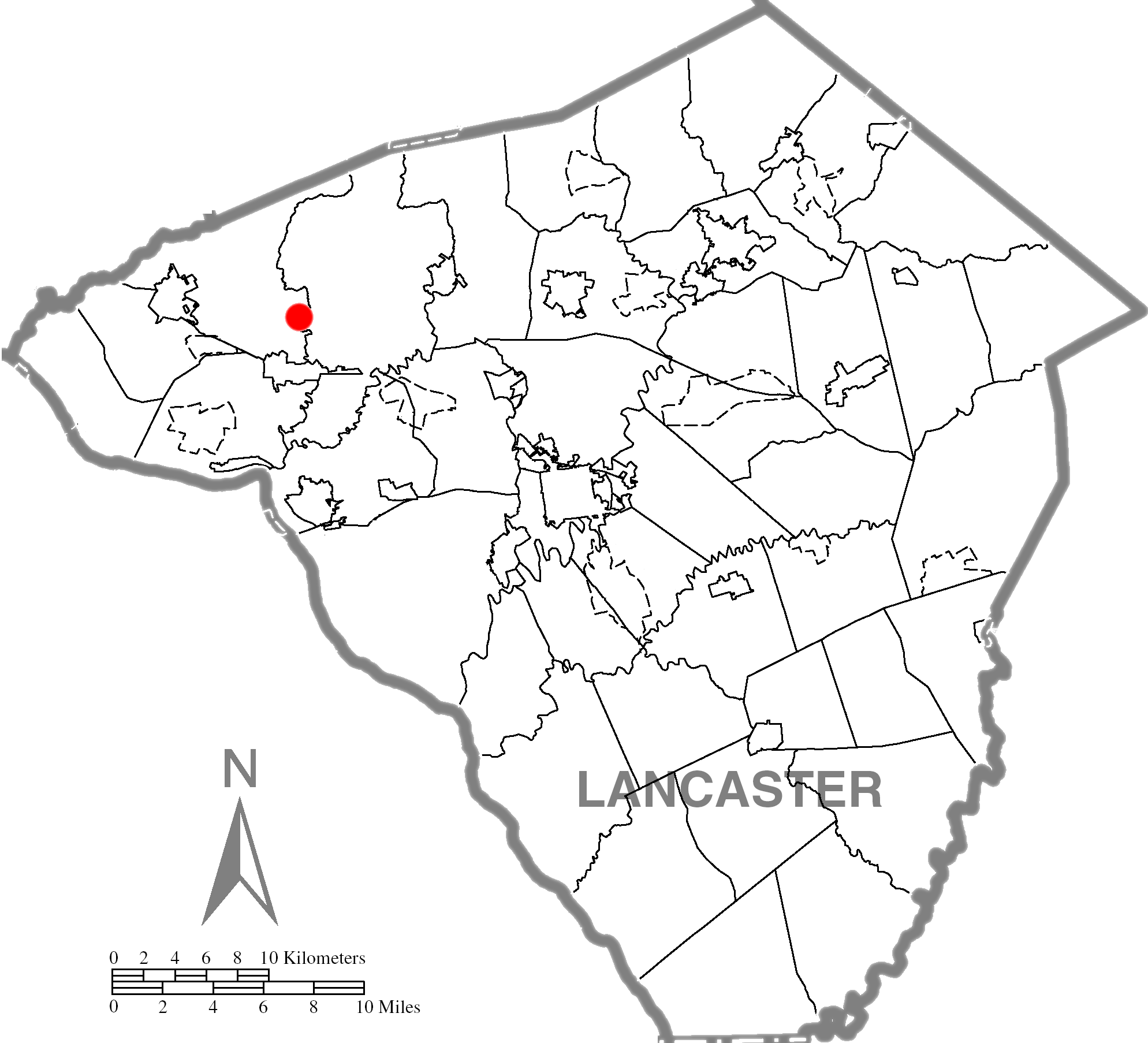
The former location of the bridge before it was burnt

The Risser's Mill Covered Bridge or Horst's Mill Covered Bridge was a covered bridge that spanned Little Chickie's Creek in Lancaster County, Pennsylvania, United States. It was burnt by an arsonist on July 8, 2002. The arsonist was caught and arrested by police. But the covered bridge had been completely destroyed and Risser's Mill Covered Bridge across the Little Chiques Creek was never seen again. As of October 2006, a concrete bridge is being built 100 feet north of the site of the bridge. Plans exist to rebuild a replica of the bridge on the original hand-laid stone bridge abutments. The bridge's WGCB Number is 38-36-36. Added in 1980, it was listed on the National Register of Historic Places as structure number 80004612, and was removed from the Register on December 5, 2003.

== History ==
The bridge was built in 1872 by Elias McMellen using a Burr arch truss design.

== Dimensions ==
- Length: 82 feet (25.0 m) total length
- Width: 15 feet (4.6 m) total width
