= Landis Mill Covered Bridge =

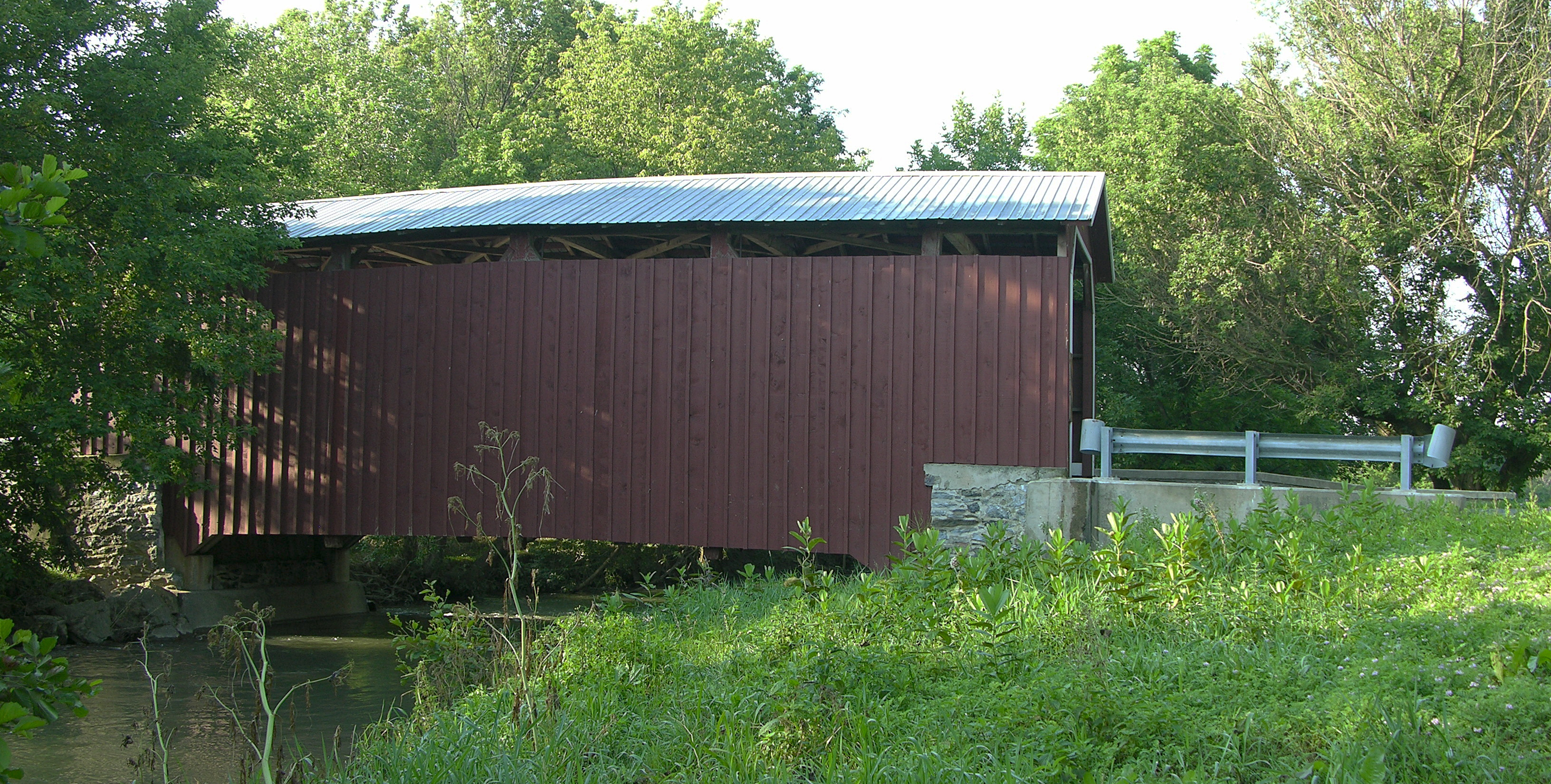
- Coordinates: 40.0680°N 76.3448°W
- Locale: Lancaster County, Pennsylvania, United States
- Official name: Little Conestoga #1 Bridge

Characteristics
- Design: single span, double pyramidal-shaped Burr-type truss, multiple king post truss
- Total length: 53 feet (16.2 m)

History
- Constructed by: Elias McMellen
- Construction start: 1873
- Landis Mill Covered Bridge
- U.S. National Register of Historic Places
- MPS: Covered Bridges of Lancaster County TR
- NRHP reference No.: 80003526
- Added to NRHP: December 10, 1980

Location
- Interactive map of Landis Mill Covered Bridge

The Landis Mill Covered Bridge is a covered bridge that spans the Little Conestoga Creek in Lancaster County, Pennsylvania, United States. A county-owned and maintained bridge, its official designation is the Little Conestoga #1 Bridge. The bridge, built in 1873 by Elias McMellen, is today surrounded by a development, shopping center, and highways on the boundary of Lancaster, Pennsylvania. At 53 feet (16 m), it is the shortest covered bridge in the county.

The bridge has a single span, wooden, double pyramidal-shaped Burr-type trusses and multiple king post truss design with the addition of steel hanger rods. It is the only bridge in the county to use this design. The deck is made from oak planks. It is painted red, the traditional color of Lancaster County covered bridges, on both the inside and outside. Both portals to the bridge are painted in red with white trim.

The bridge's WGCB Number is 38-36-16. In 1980 it was added to the National Register of Historic Places as structure number 80003526. It is located at 40°4′4.8″N 76°20′41.4″W (40.06800, -76.34483). It can be found northwest of Lancaster on Shreiner Road one block West of the Park City Center shopping mall.

== History ==
Landis Mill Covered Bridge was built in 1873 by Elias McMellen at a cost of $969. McMellen, who built many of Lancaster's covered bridges using the Burr arch truss, chose to build this short bridge using a simpler design with multiple kingpost trusses and, instead of Burr arches, pyramidal-shaped trusses to add additional support. The bridge has remained despite the development of the surrounding countryside. Landis Mill Covered Bridge crosses the Little Conestoga Creek just a block west of Park City Mall. Built in 1873, this covered bridge uses the Kingpost Truss, no arch, and at only 53 feet long, it is the shortest covered bridge in Lancaster county.

== Dimensions ==
- Length: 41 feet (12.5 m) span and 53 feet (16 m) total length
- Width: 13 feet (4.0 m) clear deck and 15 feet (4.6 m) total width
- Overhead clearance: 10 feet 6 inches (3.20 m)
- Underclearance: 8 feet (2.4 m)

== Gallery ==
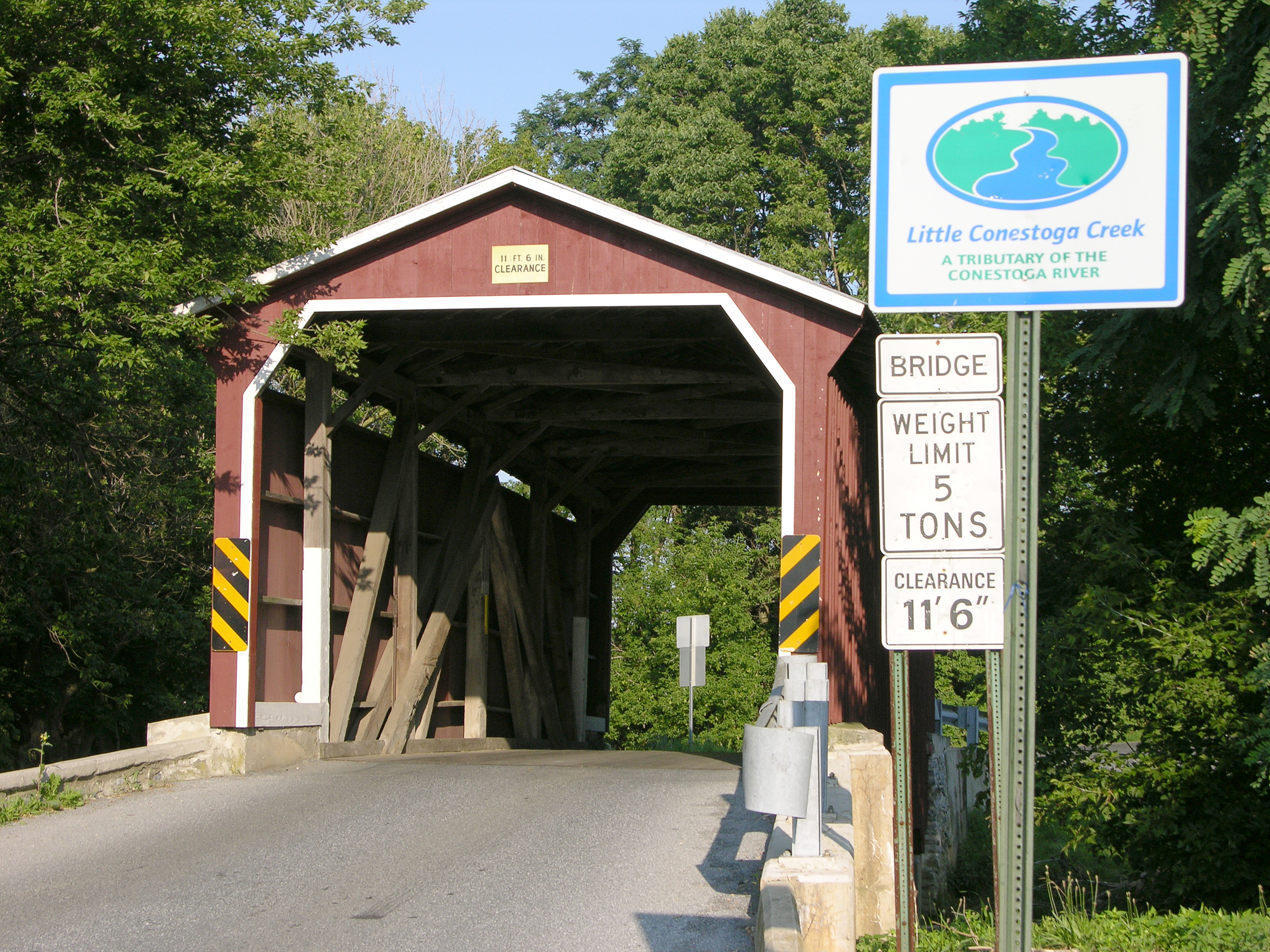
One of the approaches to the bridge

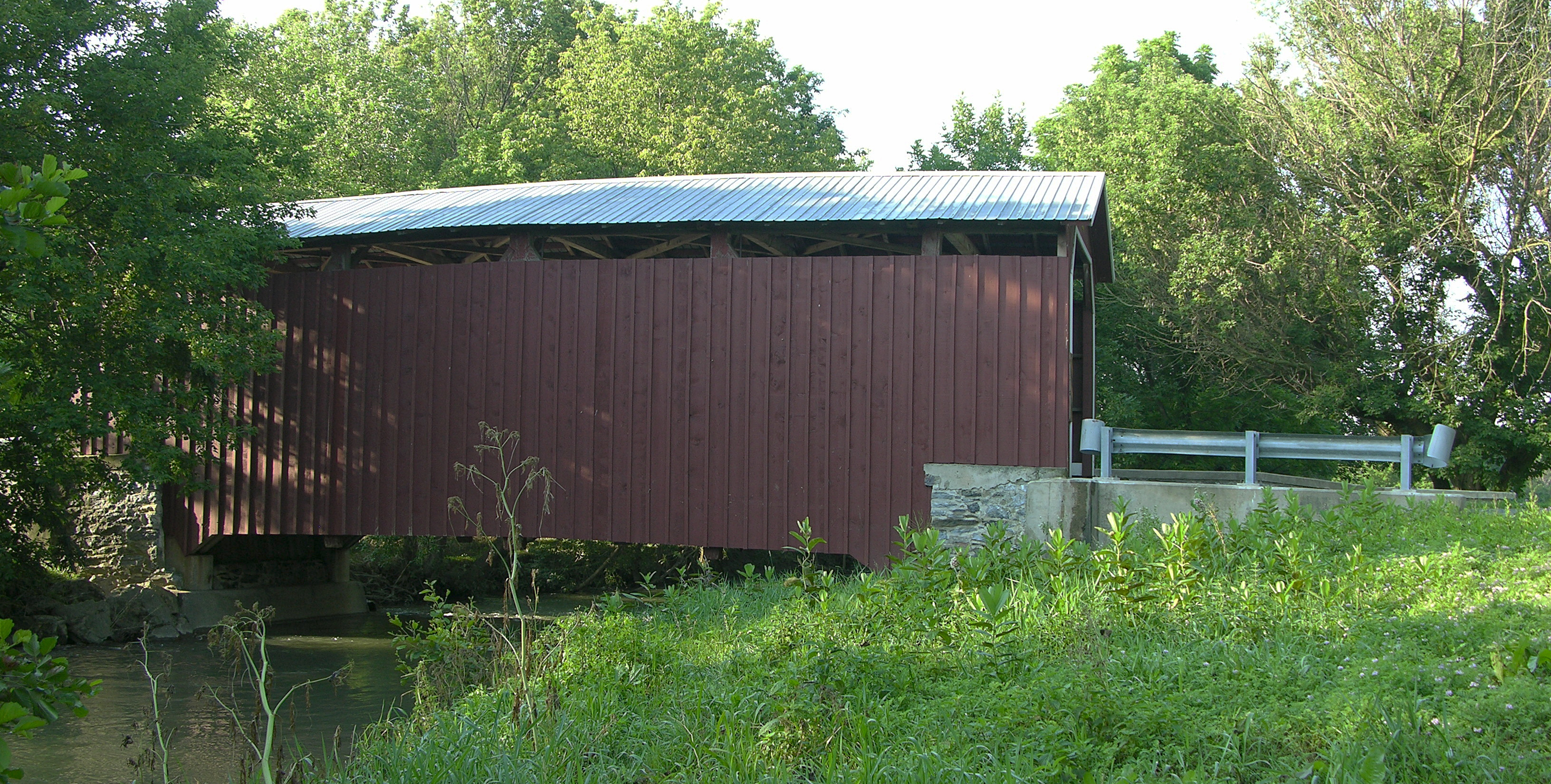
Side view

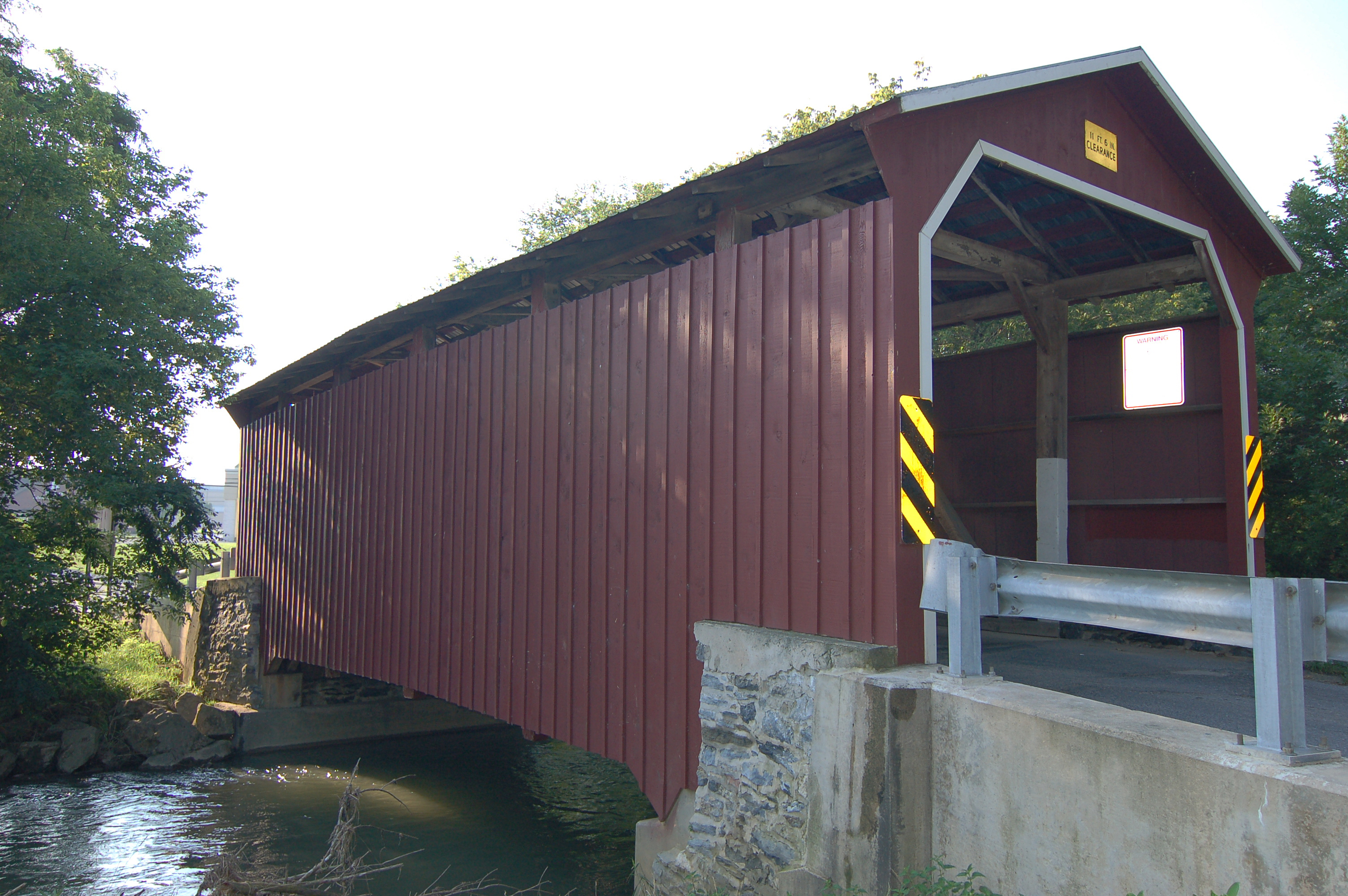
Three quarters view

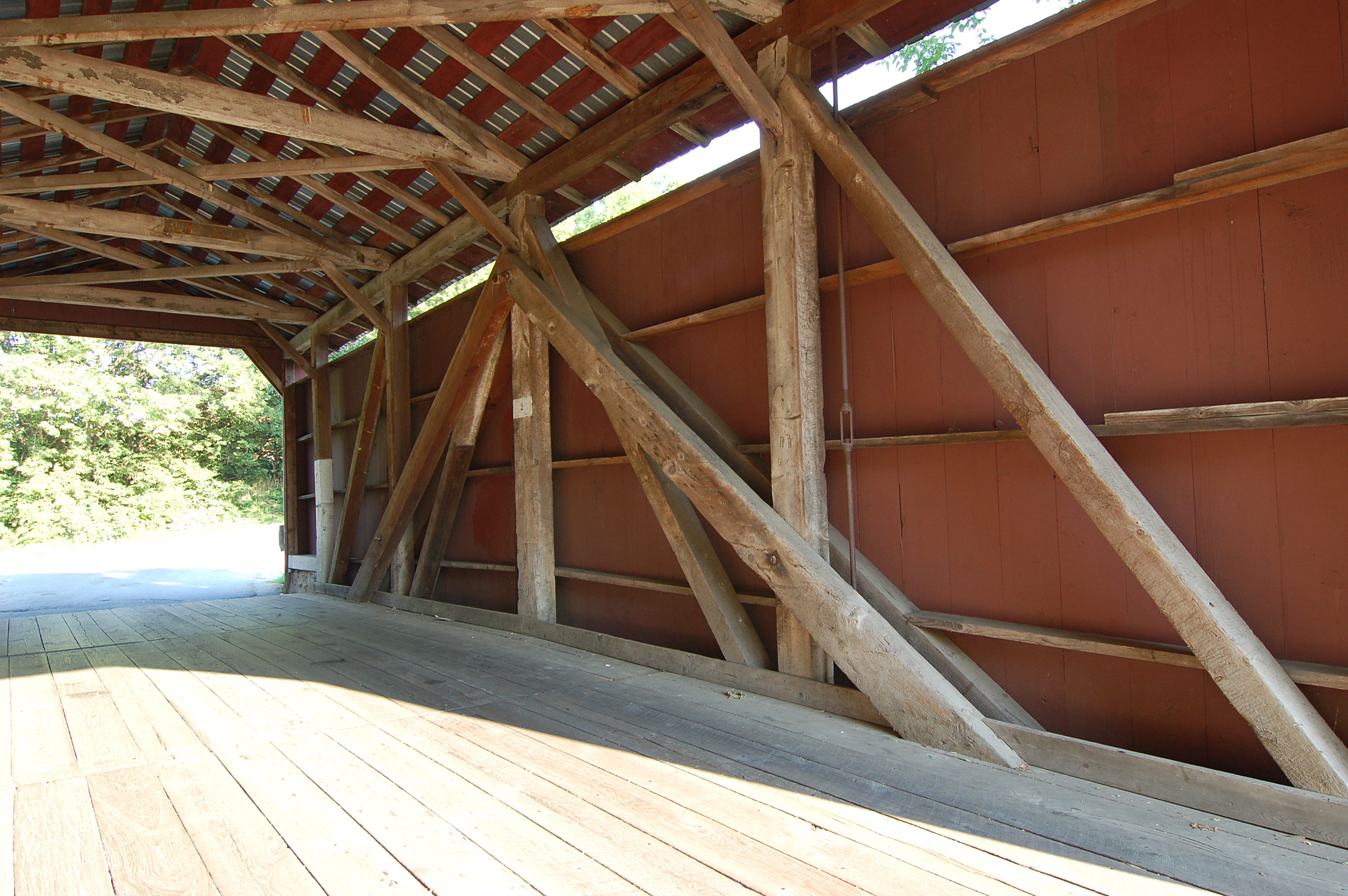
Inside of the bridge showing the Multiple kingpost truss and the Burr-type pyramidal-shaped support truss design

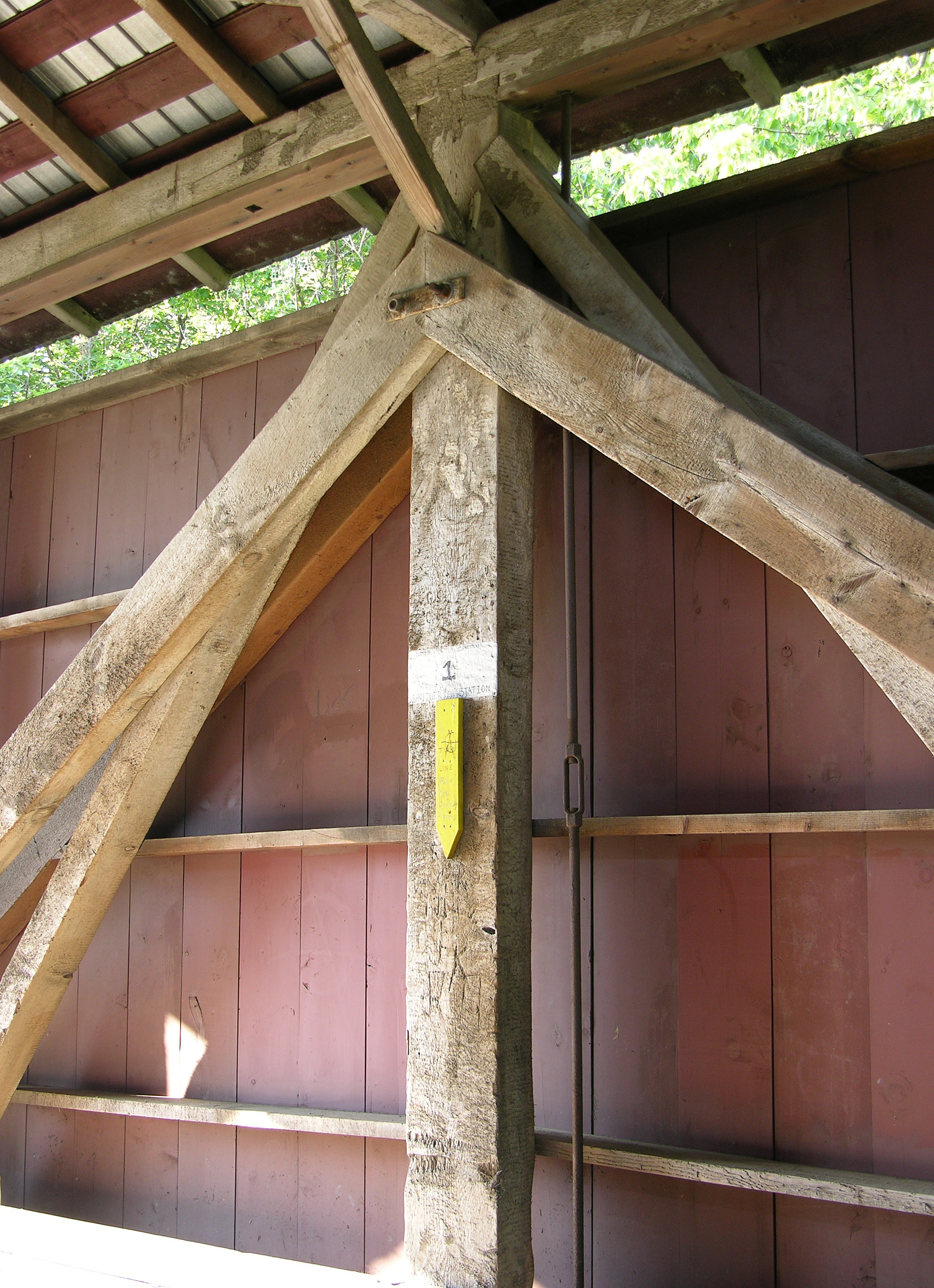
Closeup of the truss joint

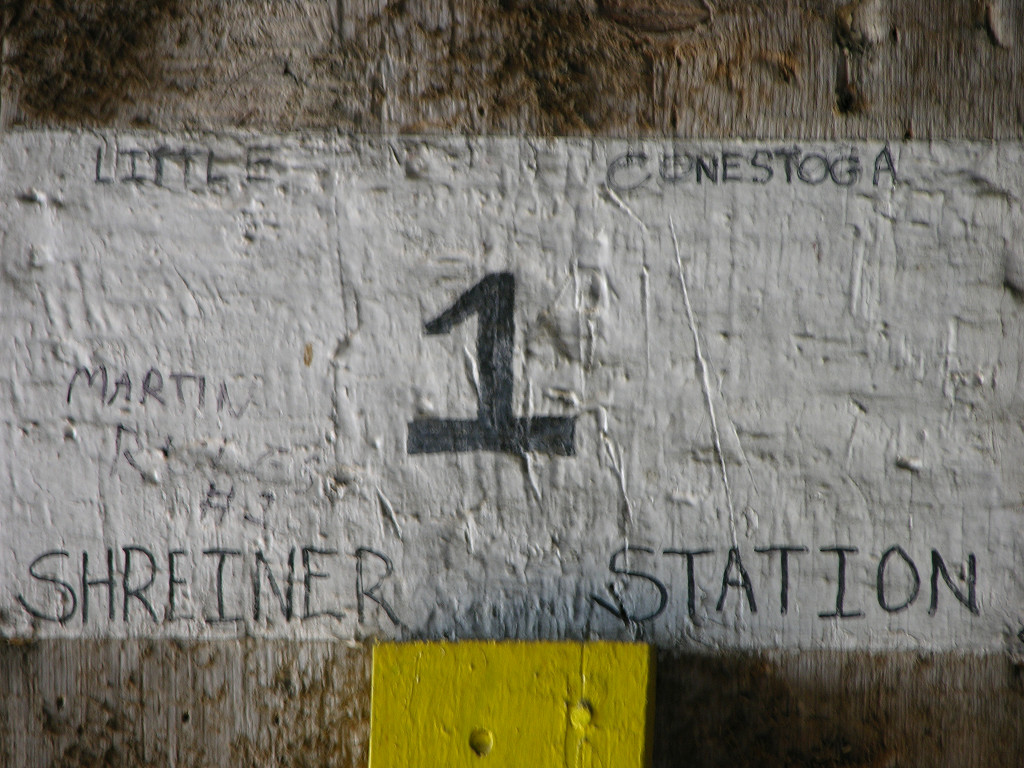
The bridge identification sign inside the bridge

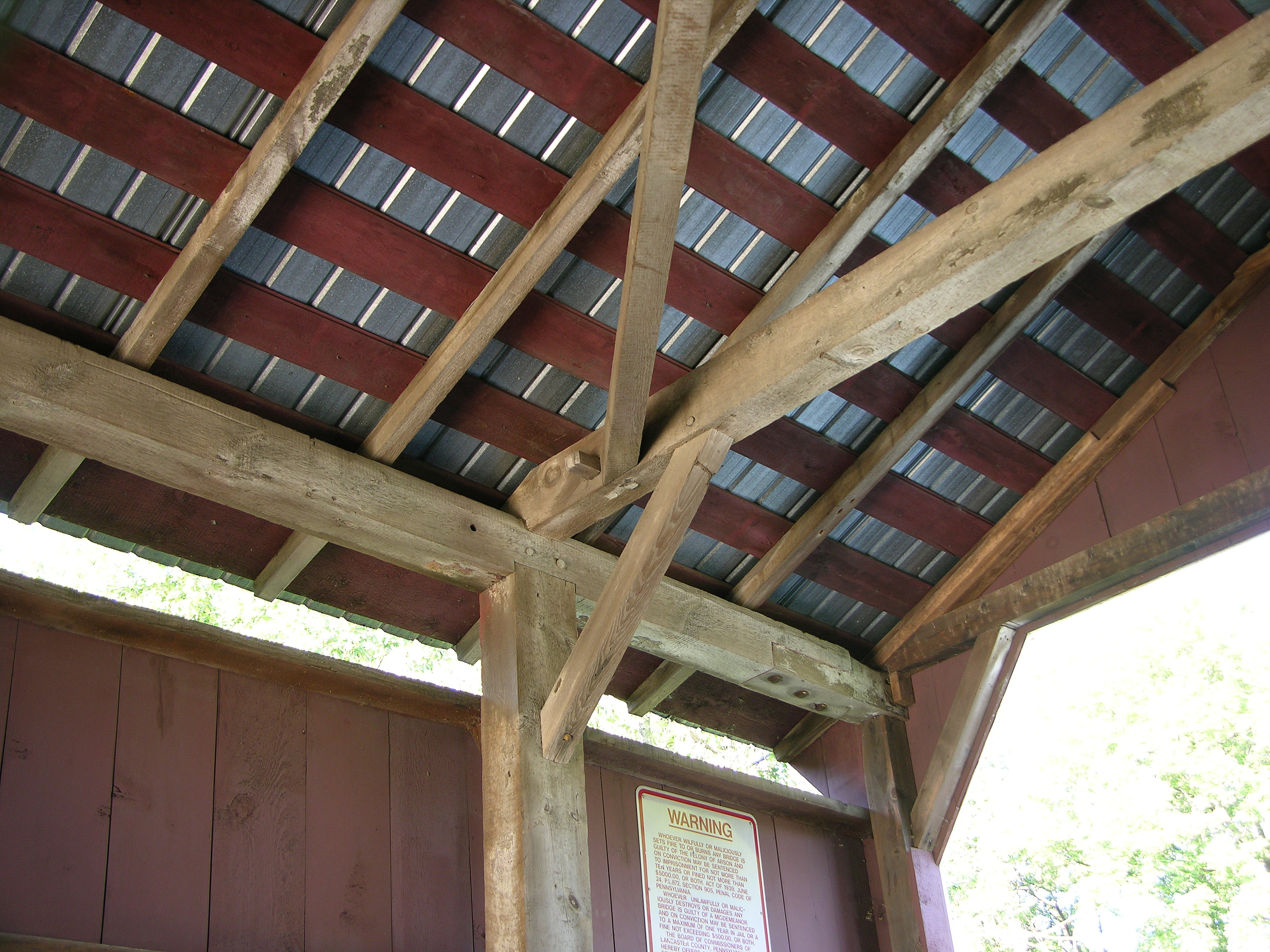
One of the inside corners of the bridge with the roof
