= Pennsylvania Route 741 =

State highway in Lancaster County, Pennsylvania, US

Pennsylvania Route 741

Route information
- Maintained by PennDOT and East Hempfield Township
- Length: 25.277 mi (40.679 km)

Major junctions
- West end: Rohrerstown Road near East Petersburg
- PA 283 near Lancaster; US 30 near Lancaster; PA 23 near Lancaster; PA 462 near Lancaster; PA 999 in Millersville; PA 324 in New Danville; US 222 / PA 272 in Willow Street; PA 896 near Strasburg
- East end: PA 41 in Gap

Location
- Country: United States
- State: Pennsylvania
- Counties: Lancaster

Highway system
- Pennsylvania State Route System; Interstate; US; State; Scenic; Legislative
← PA 739	→ PA 742

Pennsylvania Route 741 (PA 741) is a 26.3-mile-long (42.3 km) state highway that runs through western and southern Lancaster County in the U.S. state of Pennsylvania. The western terminus is along Rohrerstown Road north of an intersection with Commercial Avenue near East Petersburg. The eastern terminus is at PA 41 in Gap. PA 741 heads south from East Petersburg and runs through the western suburbs of Lancaster. The route turns southeast and passes through Millersville before it turns east at New Danville. PA 741 forms a concurrency with U.S. Route 222 (US 222) between Willow Street and Lampeter before it continues east through farmland in the Pennsylvania Dutch Country that is home to several Amish families, passing through Strasburg before reaching Gap.

The section of road between Willow Street and Lampeter was designated as part of US 230 in 1926 and concurrent with PA 72 in 1927, with US 222 replacing US 230 by 1928. In 1928, the road between Willow Street and Gap became part of PA 41. PA 741 was designated by 1930 to run from PA 41 north to US 30 in Gap. In the 1930s, PA 41 and PA 741 switched alignments, with PA 741 running between US 222 in Lampeter and PA 41 in Gap and PA 41 heading north to US 30. PA 741 was extended west to PA 324 south of New Danville in the 1970s. The route was extended west to PA 722 in East Petersburg in the 1980s. The western terminus was cut to its current location after 2005.

== Route description ==
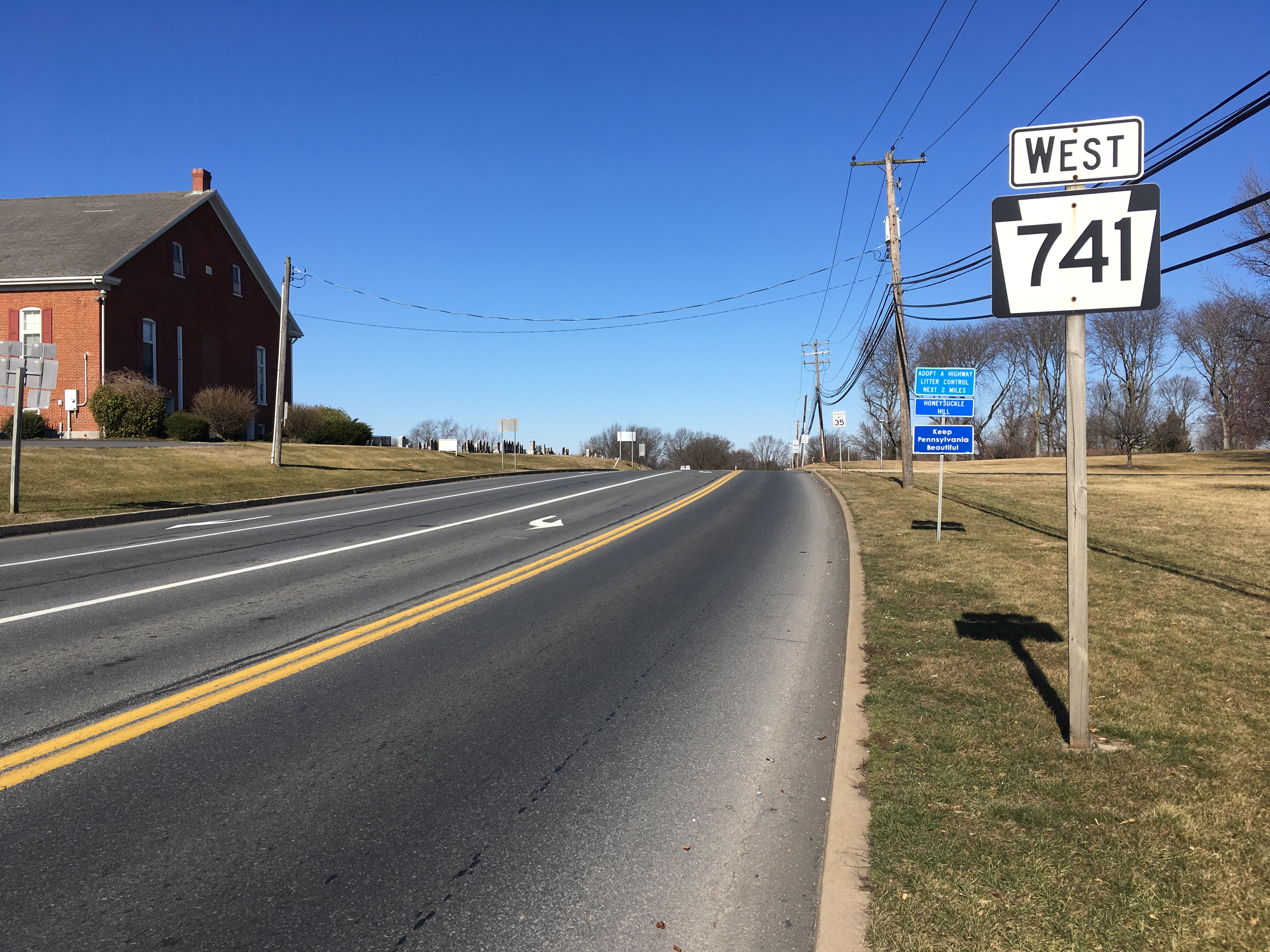
PA 741 westbound past PA 999 in Millersville

PA 741 begins at an arbitrary point along Rohrerstown Road north of an intersection with Commercial Avenue in East Hempfield Township in Lancaster County, with Rohrerstown Road continuing north as a local road toward the borough of East Petersburg past the terminus of PA 741. From this point, PA 741 heads south as a three-lane road with a center left-turn lane that is locally maintained, passing through industrial parks. The route continues to an interchange with PA 283, at which point it becomes state-maintained. The road crosses the Little Conestoga Creek into Manheim Township after PA 283. The route becomes two lanes again and turns east prior to turning southwest and crossing the Little Conestoga Creek back into East Hempfield Township. At this point, PA 741 becomes McGovernville Road and comes to a bridge over Norfolk Southern's Lititz Secondary and Amtrak's Keystone Corridor railroad lines. The road passes a mix of homes and woods as it comes to the Harrisburg Pike intersection, where it makes a turn to the south onto Rohrerstown Road, a three lane road with a center left-turn lane. PA 741 passes homes to the west and a branch of Lancaster General Hospital to the east prior to coming to the US 30 interchange. In the area of the interchange, PA 741 is briefly a divided highway. Following US 30, the route becomes a two-lane undivided road and passes residences prior to crossing Norfolk Southern's Columbia Secondary railroad line at-grade and entering the residential and commercial community of Rohrerstown. Here, PA 741 crosses PA 23. After leaving Rohrerstown, the road passes a mix of farms and businesses prior to an intersection with PA 462.

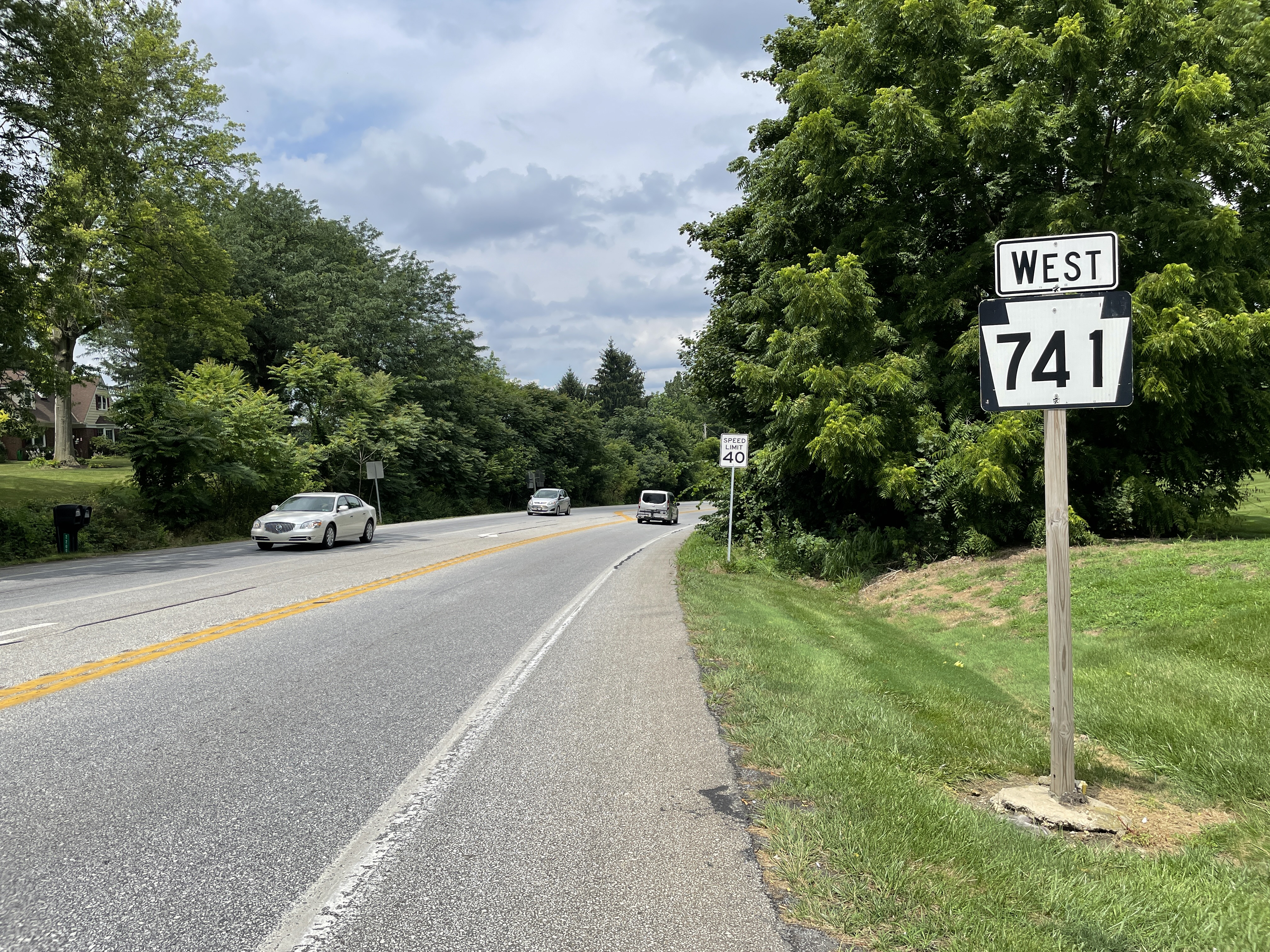
PA 741 westbound past PA 324 in New Danville

After this intersection, PA 741 enters Manor Township and becomes Millersville Road, passing farm fields to the west and suburban residential neighborhoods to the east. Farther south, the road enters areas of woods and homes, making a turn to the southeast and crossing Little Conestoga Creek. The road briefly forms the border between Manor Township to the southwest and the borough of Millersville to the northeast prior to fully entering Millersville and crossing PA 999, at which point the road passes businesses. Following this intersection, PA 741 heads through farmland before passing a few homes. At the Wabank Road intersection, the road enters Lancaster Township and passes a mix of homes and farms before crossing the Conestoga River. At this point, PA 741 continues into Pequea Township and runs through agricultural areas prior to entering the residential community of New Danville. Here, the route intersects PA 324 and forms a concurrency with that route, heading south on Marticville Road out of New Danville. PA 741 splits from PA 324 by turning east onto Long Lane, passing more farmland and crossing into West Lampeter Township.

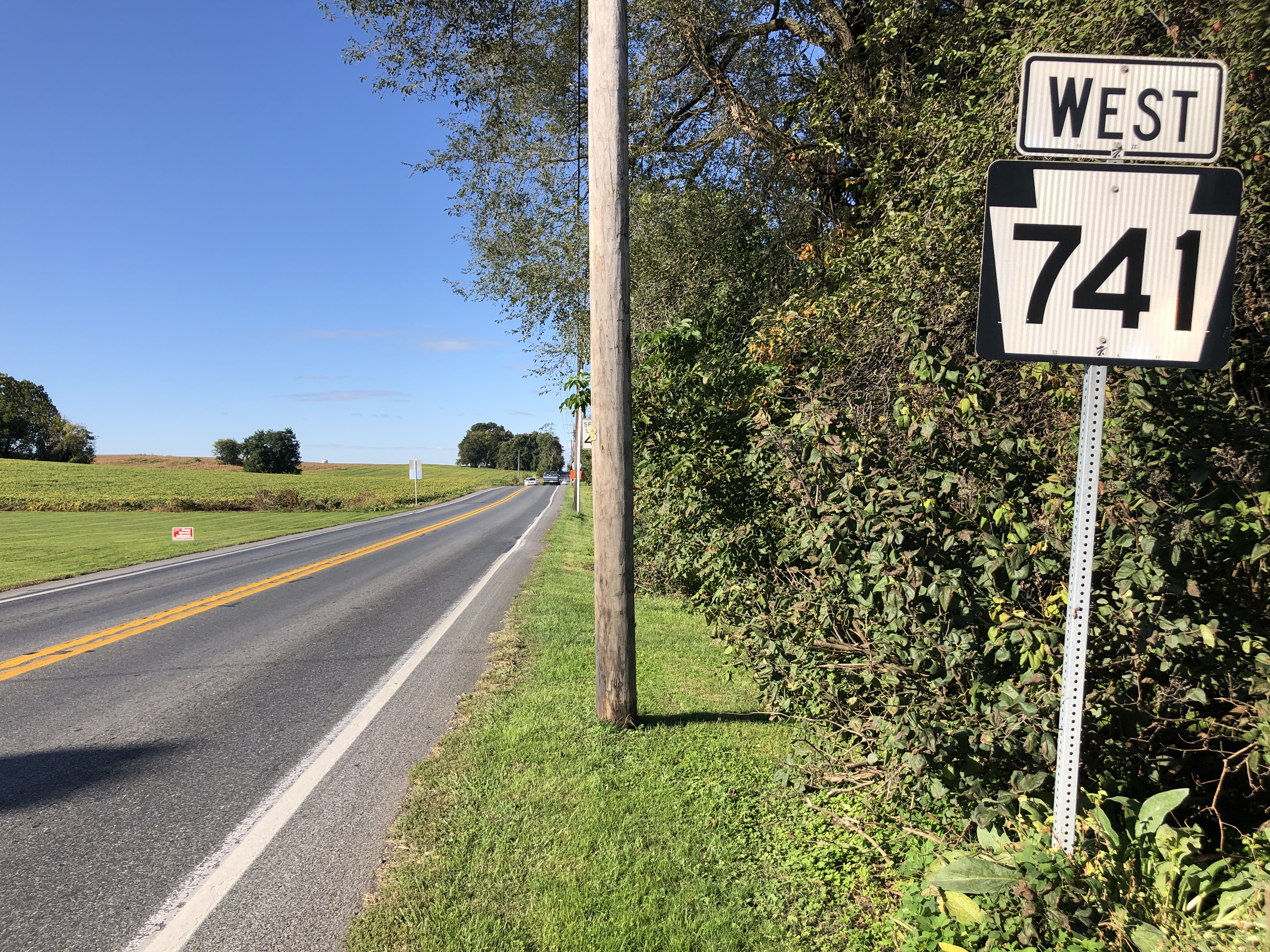
PA 741 westbound in Pequea Township

Upon reaching the community of Willow Street, PA 741 widens into a two-lane divided highway and meets the southbound direction of US 222/PA 272. Here, the route forms a concurrency with southbound US 222 and enters commercial areas. A short distance later, the road intersects the northbound direction of US 222/PA 272, at which point PA 741 becomes concurrent with both directions of US 222. The two routes continue east on Beaver Valley Pike, passing farms to the north and commercial development to the south. The road becomes undivided and passes agricultural areas and homes before PA 741 splits from US 222 by continuing east on Village Road. At this point, the route enters the Pennsylvania Dutch Country of eastern Lancaster County, which is home to many Amish farms. The route continues through a mix of farms and residences as it passes the community of Lampeter, where it passes south of Lampeter-Strasburg High School. After a bridge over the Pequea Creek, PA 741 enters Strasburg Township and turns to the southeast. Upon crossing into the borough of Strasburg, the route heads east-northeast onto Miller Street and passes several homes. At the Lancaster Avenue (which becomes Strasburg Pike outside the borough) intersection, PA 741 turns east onto West Main Street and comes to the center of Strasburg at Decatur Street. The route continue past more homes on East Main Street prior to crossing into Strasburg Township and meeting PA 896.

At this point, PA 741 continues east on Gap Road between farms to the north and residential and commercial development to the south, passing north of a shopping center that is home to the Choo Choo Barn, a model railroad display. The route crosses the Strasburg Rail Road at-grade and passes between the East Strasburg station and a yard along the Strasburg Rail Road to the north and the Railroad Museum of Pennsylvania to the south. The road continues into open farmland and crosses into Paradise Township at the Paradise Lane intersection, becoming Strasburg Road. The route heads through more rural areas as it comes into Salisbury Township, at which point PA 741 enters wooded areas with Amtrak's Keystone Corridor parallel to the north of the road and homes to the south of the road. As the road enters the community of Gap, it makes a sharp turn to the south, continuing to parallel the railroad line. PA 741 turns east to cross over the Amtrak line prior to reaching its eastern terminus at PA 41.

== History ==
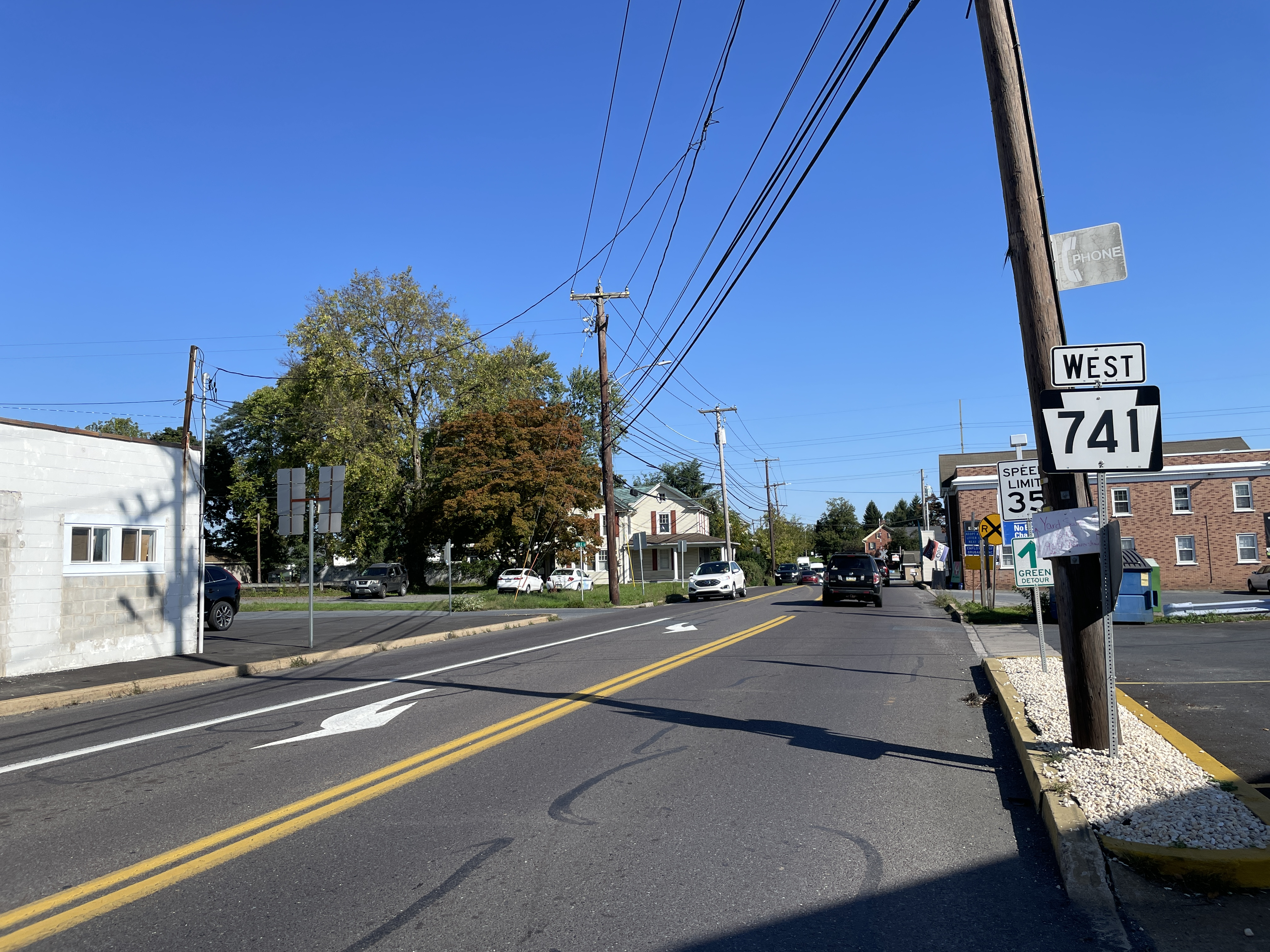
PA 741 westbound past PA 23 in East Hempfield Township

When Pennsylvania first legislated routes in 1911, present-day PA 741 was not given a route number. US 230 was designated onto the road between Willow Street and Lampeter in 1926; PA 72 was designated concurrent in 1927 and the US 230 designation was replaced by US 222 in 1928. In 1928, the road between Willow Street and Gap was designated as part of PA 41, which ran from Harrisburg southeast to the Delaware border. At this time, the road was paved between Willow Street and Strasburg and unpaved between Strasburg and Gap. By 1930, PA 741 was designated to run PA 41 north to US 30 in Gap on a paved road. By this time, PA 41 was paved from a point east of Strasburg east to Gap. Also, the concurrent PA 72 designation was removed from US 222/PA 41 between Willow Street and Lampeter. In the 1930s, PA 741 was realigned to run from US 222 in Lampeter east to PA 41 in Gap, replacing that section of PA 41. Meanwhile, PA 41 was realigned onto the former alignment of PA 741 heading north to US 30 in Gap. By 1950, the current alignment of the route between East Petersburg and Willow Street was paved; at this time the road did not carry a route number. In the 1970s, PA 741 was extended west to PA 324 south of New Danville. The route was further extended north to PA 722 in East Petersburg in the 1980s, following its current alignment and Rohrerstown Road to East Petersburg before following Lemon Street to PA 722. PA 741 previously ran concurrent with PA 896 between Decatur Street and Georgetown Road in Strasburg. The concurrency was removed when PA 896 was rerouted to bypass Strasburg to the northeast in November 2009. After 2005, the western terminus of PA 741 was cut back from PA 722 in East Petersburg to its current location north of the Commercial Avenue intersection in East Hempfield Township.

== Major intersections ==
The entire route is in Lancaster County.

Location	mi	km	Destinations	Notes
East Hempfield Township	0.000	0.000	Rohrerstown Road	Western terminus
East Hempfield Township	0.300	0.483	PA 283 – Lancaster, Harrisburg	Interchange
East Hempfield Township	2.173	3.497	US 30 – Downtown Lancaster, York	Interchange
East Hempfield Township	2.735	4.402	PA 23 (Marietta Avenue)	
East Hempfield–Manor township line	3.696	5.948	PA 462 (Columbia Avenue) – Lancaster, Columbia	
Millersville	5.784	9.308	PA 999 (Millersville Pike/Manor Avenue) – Lancaster, Millersville	
Pequea Township	8.675	13.961	PA 324 north (New Danville Pike) – Lancaster	West end of PA 324 overlap
Pequea Township	9.162	14.745	PA 324 south (Marticville Road) – Marticville, Martic Forge	East end of PA 324 overlap
West Lampeter Township	10.820	17.413	US 222 north / PA 272 (Willow Street Pike) – Willow Street, Buck	West end of US 222 overlap
West Lampeter Township	12.193	19.623	US 222 south (Beaver Valley Pike) – Quarryville	East end of US 222 overlap
Strasburg Township	17.200	27.681	PA 896 (Historic Drive) to US 30	
Salisbury Township	25.277	40.679	PA 41 (Gap Newport Pike)	Eastern terminus
1.000 mi = 1.609 km; 1.000 km = 0.621 mi: Concurrency terminus

== PA 741 Truck ==
Pennsylvania Route 741 Truck
- Location: Lancaster County, Pennsylvania
- Existed: 2013–present

Pennsylvania Route 741 Truck is an unsigned truck route marked with a red arrow that bypasses a weight restricted bridge over a tributary of the Londonland Run, on which trucks over 32 tons and combination loads over 40 tons are prohibited. The route follows Black Horse Road, US 30, and Mcilvaine Road through Lancaster County, Pennsylvania. The route was established in 2013.

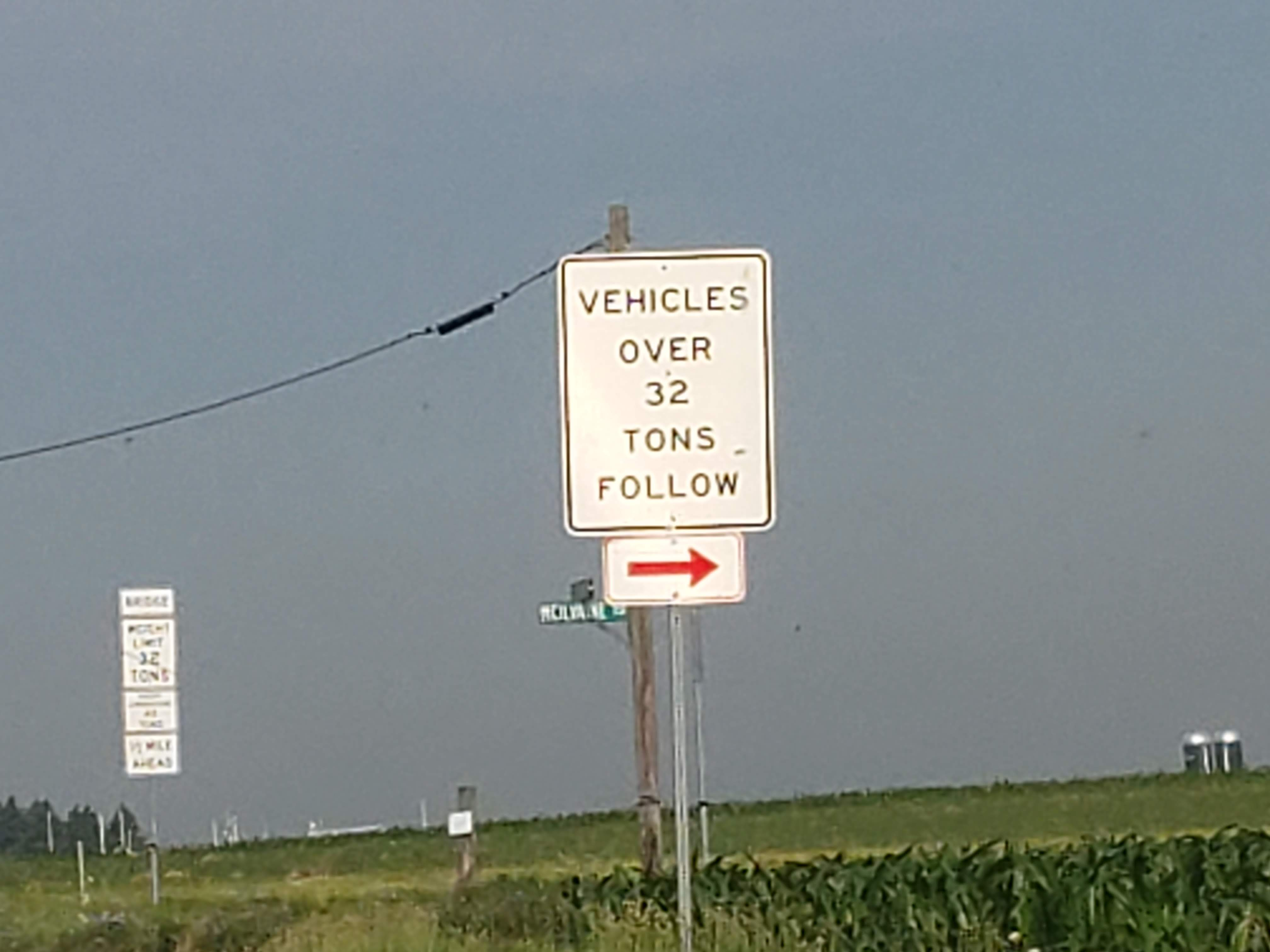
PA 741 Truck beginning at Mcilvaine Road in Lancaster County. In South Central Pennsylvania, truck routes that bypass weight restricted bridges are unsigned and instead marked with red arrows.
