= Pennsylvania Route 324 =

State highway in Lancaster County, Pennsylvania, US

Pennsylvania Route 324

Route information
- Maintained by PennDOT
- Length: 13.308 mi (21.417 km)

Major junctions
- South end: SR 3038 in Pequea
- PA 741 in New Danville
- North end: US 222 / PA 272 in Lancaster

Location
- Country: United States
- State: Pennsylvania
- Counties: Lancaster

Highway system
- Pennsylvania State Route System; Interstate; US; State; Scenic; Legislative
← US 322	→ PA 325

Pennsylvania Route 324 (PA 324) is a 13.3-mile-long (21.4 km) state highway located in the western part of Lancaster County, Pennsylvania. The southern terminus is at State Route 3038 (SR 3038, Bridge Valley Road) in the community of Pequea along the east bank of the Susquehanna River in Martic Township. The northern terminus is at U.S. Route 222 (US 222)/PA 272 in Lancaster. PA 324 heads northeast from Pequea parallel to the Pequea Creek. The route continues north to New Danville, where it has a concurrency with PA 741. From here, PA 324 runs parallel to the Conestoga River to its northern terminus in the southern part of Lancaster. The northern portion of PA 324 follows the Lancaster and New Danville Turnpike, a 19th-century turnpike. PA 324 was designated in 1928 to run from PA 124 at Penn Grant Road north to PA 124 in New Danville, while PA 124 was designated on the remainder of the road between Lancaster and Pequea, where it crossed the Susquehanna River on a bridge towards York. By 1930, PA 324 was paved and the PA 124 bridge over the river was removed. PA 324 was extended to its current length in the 1930s.

== Route description ==
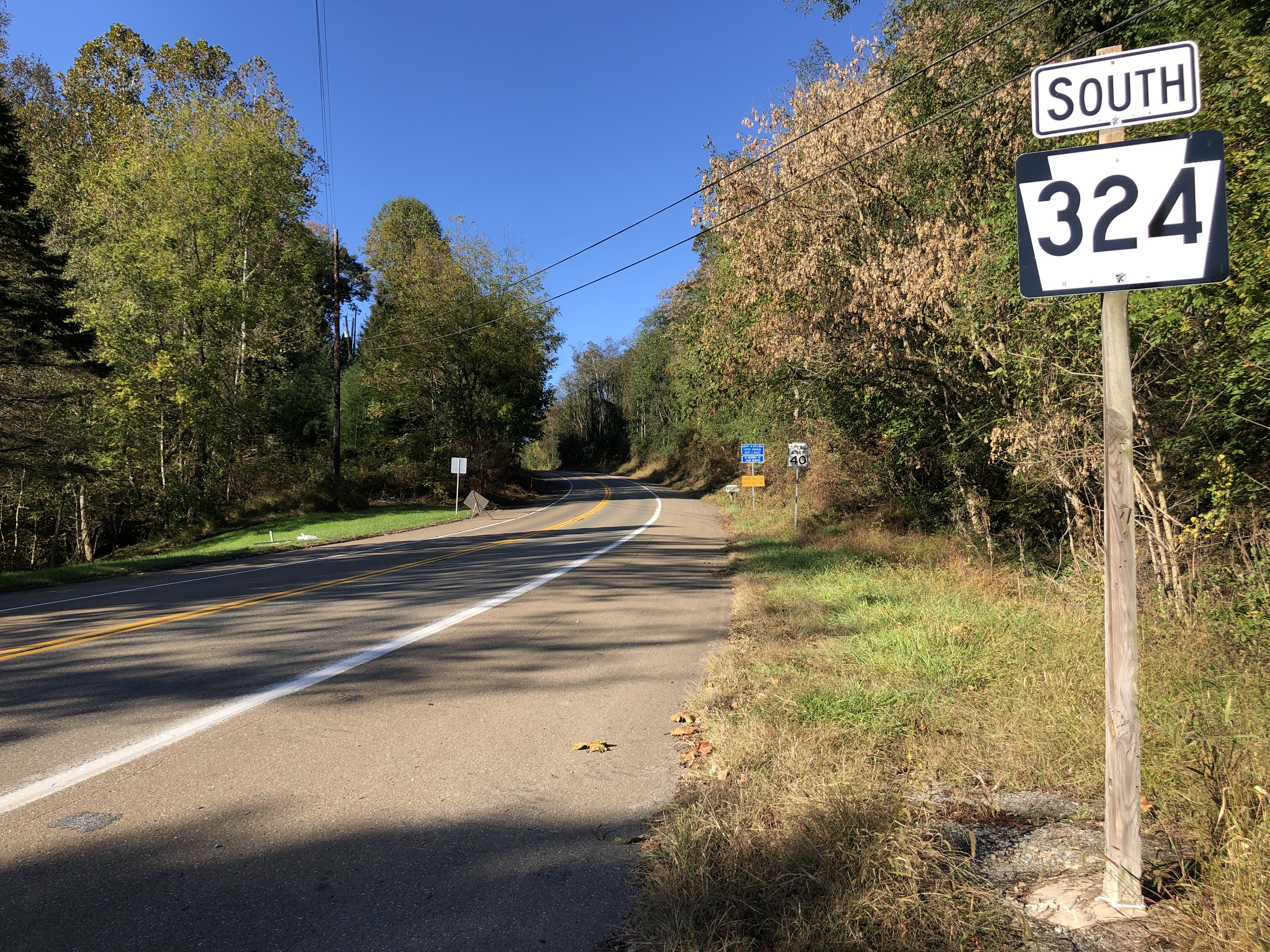
PA 324 southbound in Conestoga Township

PA 324 begins in the community of Pequea in Martic Township, Lancaster County, where the road continues south along the Susquehanna River as SR 3038 (Bridge Valley Road), an unsigned quadrant route. From here, the route heads north-northeast as two-lane undivided Bridge Valley Road, running through wooded residential areas with Norfolk Southern's Port Road Branch railroad line and the Susquehanna River parallel to the west of the road. PA 324 crosses the Pequea Creek into Conestoga Township and turns east onto Pequea Boulevard to run parallel to the Pequea Creek through hilly forests. The route winds north along the creek before it heads east-northeast farther north of the creek and passes through the residential community of Coleman. The road continues into forests and crosses the Pequea Creek back into Martic Township, where it becomes Marticville Road and passes through the community of Martic Forge. PA 324 continues through forests with a few homes and turns north to cross the Enola Low Grade Trail, making a turn east before resuming north. The route heads northeast into a mix of farmland and woodland with some homes, heading east before turning north again. The road continues through agricultural areas and passes through the residential community of Marticville.

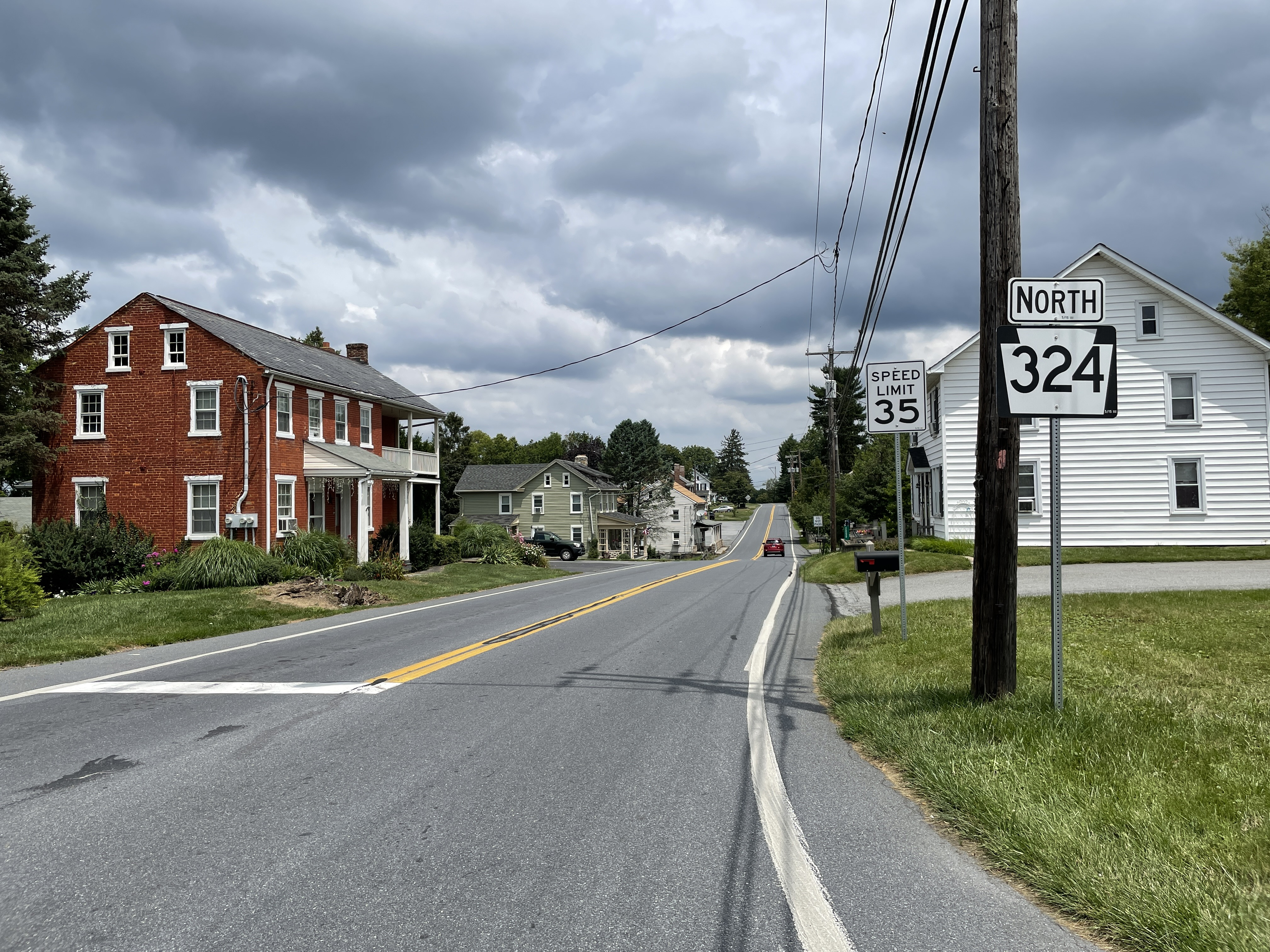
PA 324 northbound past PA 741 in New Danville

The route crosses Pequea Creek again and enters Pequea Township, where it winds north through a mix of farmland and woodland with occasional homes. PA 324 continues north through agricultural areas and comes to an intersection with PA 741, at which point that route turns north to join PA 324 in a concurrency. The two routes head north to the residential community of New Danville, where PA 324 splits from PA 741 by heading northeast on New Danville Pike. The route runs north through farmland before it curves northeast into wooded areas and crosses the Conestoga River into Lancaster Township. The road continues north between a mix of farmland and residential development to the west and wooded areas along the Conestoga River to the east. PA 324 passes to the east of a sewage treatment plant before it continues into commercial areas and intersects the southbound direction of US 222/PA 272 in the community of Engleside. Past this, the route becomes one-way northbound with one lane of traffic and enters the city of Lancaster, heading northeast through urban residential and commercial areas on South Queen Street. PA 324 reaches its northern terminus upon merging with northbound US 222/PA 272, with those two routes continuing north along South Queen Street.

== History ==
The northern portion of PA 324 was chartered as the Lancaster and New Danville Turnpike in 1870, a private turnpike connecting New Danville to Lancaster. The present-day alignment of PA 324 was not designated as part of a legislative route when Pennsylvania first legislated routes in 1911. By 1926, the road between Lancaster and Martic Forge was paved while the portion between Martic Forge and Pequea was unpaved. A bridge continued across the Susquehanna River to York Furnace in York County. In 1928, PA 324 was designated onto unpaved Marticville Road, running between intersections with PA 124 at Penn Grant Road and New Danville Pike. Meanwhile, the remainder of the road between Pequea and Lancaster was designated as the eastern portion of PA 124, which continued west across the river to York. PA 124 followed Penn Grant Road west and New Danville Pike northeast between its intersections with PA 324. By 1930, the entire length of PA 324 was paved. Also, the PA 124 bridge across the Susquehanna River was removed. In the 1930s, PA 324 was extended onto its current alignment between Pequea and US 222 in Lancaster, replacing that portion of PA 124. At this time, the entire route was paved. In the 1980s, PA 741 was designated concurrent with PA 324 between the Long Lane intersection and New Danville.

== Major intersections ==
The entire route is in Lancaster County.

Location	mi	km	Destinations	Notes
Martic Township	0.000	0.000	SR 3038 (Bridge Valley Road)	Southern terminus of PA 324
Pequea Township	9.735	15.667	PA 741 east (Long Lane) – Willow Street, Strasburg	Southern terminus of PA 741 concurrency
Pequea Township	10.222	16.451	PA 741 west (Millersville Road) – Millersville	Northern terminus of PA 741 concurrency
Lancaster Township	13.060	21.018	US 222 south (PA 272 south / South Prince Street)	Northern terminus of southbound PA 324
Lancaster	13.308	21.417	US 222 north (PA 272 north / South Queen Street / Highland Avenue)	Northern terminus of northbound PA 324; northbound only
1.000 mi = 1.609 km; 1.000 km = 0.621 mi: Concurrency terminus; Incomplete access
