= Penn Manor High School =

School in Millersville, Pennsylvania, United States

Coordinates: 40.0020°N 76.3507°W

Location
- 100 East Cottage Avenue; Millersville, Lancaster County, Pennsylvania 17551; United States

Information
- School type: Public, secondary
- School district: Penn Manor School District
- Principal: Doug Eby
- Staff: 107.62 (FTE)
- Faculty: 112 teachers (2012),
- Grades: 9–12
- Enrollment: 1,806 (2023–2024)
- Student to teacher ratio: 16.78
- Colors: Blue and gold
- Mascot: Comet
- Feeder schools: Marticville Middle School and Manor Middle School
- Website: www.pennmanor.net

Penn Manor High School is a large, rural/suburban, public secondary school located in Millersville, Pennsylvania, United States. It is the sole high school operated by the Penn Manor School District. In the 2018–2019 school year, enrollment was reported as 1,636 pupils in 9th through 12th grades. In 2011 Penn Manor School District was recognized as a School of Excellence in Technology by the Pennsylvania School Boards Association.

Virtual High School is available to students in 7th-12th grades. Students who meet graduation requirements receive a Penn Manor diploma.

== History ==
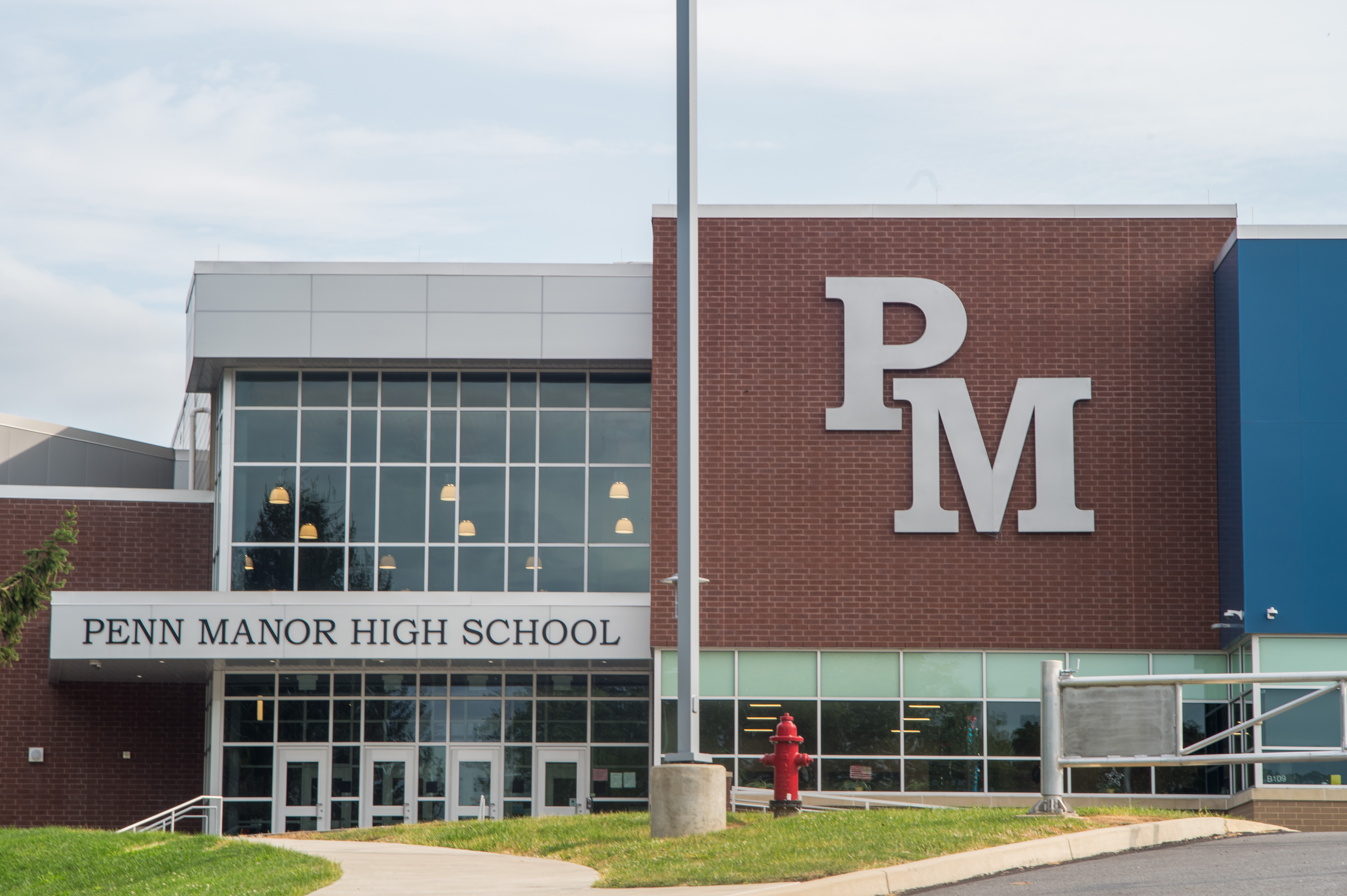
Penn Manor High School in Millersville, PA in August 2025

During the existence of this public high school, it has been known successively as the Manor Township High School, Manor-Millersville High School, and Penn Manor High School. Manor Township High School held its first graduation in 1922 at the Model School on George Street across from Old Main in Millersville, Pennsylvania. In 1932 Millersville became a borough, and the high school was operated jointly by the school directors of Manor Township and Millersville Borough. The school was renamed Manor-Millersville High School. Pupils from Conestoga, Martic and Pequea Townships as well as Washington Boro attended the school on a tuition basis. On July 13, 1953, an agreement was signed by six school boards – Conestoga Township, Manor Township, Martic Township, Millersville Borough, Pequea Township, and Washington Boro – to construct and operate a new junior-senior high school, to be named Penn Manor High School.

Ground was broken on May 24, 1956, and the building was finished on September 4, 1958. The new auditorium, with a seating capacity of 1100, was dedicated on November 9, 1958, to A. Norman Ranck, supervising principal. The library was dedicated to Sanders P. McComsey, former president of the Joint School Board. The capacity of the building was 1500 students, and the cost of construction and equipment was $3,325,000. As described in a 1959 architectural journal, "The ultra-modern Penn Manor High School in traditionally conservative Lancaster County represents an abrupt break with many local building traditions. It also serves as an ingenious solution to a knotty architectural problem. Designing a large building to fit a relatively small site, with a fall of 55 feet in 700 feet, was further complicated by solid ledges of sub-surface rock. The result was a three level plan, molding the building to the contours of the site. Another unusual and interesting example of adapting the building to the site is the flat S-shape of the 600 foot long main corridor – interrupting what would have been an overly long, monotonous, and confining hallway."

Delays were caused by a steel strike and a concrete strike, but the building was completed in September 1958, and the new school opened to 1425 students in grades 7-12.

In March 1961, the old high school building on High School Avenue was razed and the ground graded and seeded to provide additional outdoor physical education facilities. By 1961 the enrollment in grades 7–12 at Penn Manor High School had reached 1730, with an estimated enrollment of 2000 by 1964. The school board arranged to construct a new junior high school on the hill east of the high school for 600 pupils at an estimated cost of $1.2 million.

By 1966, increasing enrollment required another junior high school building in Marticville. This $2.5 million building was dedicated in 1968 and designated as a middle school, housing grades 6–8. The Millersville Junior High was also reorganized as a middle school. The ninth grade remained in the high school, where a four classroom portable building was added. Millersville Middle School became a ninth grade building, and the high school housed grades 10–12. Students routinely crossed the parking tiers to change classes between buildings. As the district population continued to grow, the Penn Manor School Board found it necessary to add a second middle school in the northern end of the district. After acquiring 50 acres of land from the John G. Herr farm at the intersection of Charlestown Road and Ironstone Ridge Road, Manor Middle School was completed in 1994.

As student enrollment continued to grow, another renovation project was planned to increase the capacity of the high school while updating the facilities to better meet students' needs. The two-year project began in 1995 and required the ninth grade students to remain in their respective middle schools another year. Students in grades 10-12 occupied half of the high school while the other half was being renovated. Staff and students then picked up and moved all books, furniture and equipment into the renovated half of the building in 1996, and construction began on the other half. The $30 million renovation project connected the former ninth grade building and the high school. New construction took place over the former parking tiers with a new cafeteria (seating capacity of 600), gymnasium (capacity of 2000), library/media center, and enclosed walkway. All classrooms were reconfigured with additional classrooms located in the former library and cafeteria. The familiar curving hallways remained, but new terrazzo floors, ceiling tiles, and freshly painted lockers were added. Along with updated lab facilities, technology was a huge part of the project, as over 500 computers were added throughout the building.

Penn Manor's switch to a 4 x 4 block schedule coincided with the renovation project. Where a traditional schedule has students moving to eight classes a day, the block schedule has four 90-minute classes in the fall and four different classes in the spring. Considering the size of the building, eight minutes were needed between classes to get from one end of the building to the other. The block schedule decreased the amount of time students spent in the hallways. Study halls were eliminated and graduation requirements were gradually increased from 21 to 28 credits required for graduation. All students are required to take four credits each in English, math, science and social studies. An honors program was developed and Advanced Placement offerings were increased.

Another four-year renovation project began in 2019 in order to accommodate the high school's 1700 students.

== Extracurriculars ==
Penn Manor School District offers a wide variety of clubs, activities and an extensive sports program.

=== Quiz Bowl ===
In 2006, the Quiz Bowl team consisting of members Justin Bradfield, Chelsea Shover, Kevin Brent, and Philip Gruber earned first place honors on WGAL's academic trivia show, BrainBusters. In 2010, the team of Grant Elledge, Brendan Stoeckl, Lars Andersen, Henry Stewart, and Christine Sharp returned to the Brainbusters championship and earned a second-place finish (out of 38 teams). In 2011, the team's lineup of Lars Andersen, Helen Hutchens, Morgan Flood, Garrett Young, and Anthony Cazillo made it to BrainBusters' Final Four, losing to rival Manheim Township. Flood later appeared in the 2012 Jeopardy! Teen Tournament, losing in the first televised round.

=== Sports ===
The district funds:

Varsity

Boys

- Baseball - AAAA
- Basketball- AAAA
- Bowling - AAAA
- Cross country - AAA
- Football - AAAA
- Golf - AAA
- Lacrosse - AAAA
- Soccer - AAA
- Swimming and diving - AAA
- Tennis - AAA
- Track and field - AAA
- Volleyball - AAA
- Wrestling - AAA

Girls

- Basketball - AAAA
- Bowling - AAAA
- Cheer - AAAA
- Cross country - AAA
- Field hockey - AAA
- Lacrosse - AAAA
- Soccer (Fall) - AAA
- Softball - AAAA
- Swimming and diving - AAA
- Tennis - AAA
- Track and field - AAA
- Volleyball - AAA

PMHS is the home of the Comets sports teams, who compete in section 1 of the Lancaster-Lebanon League. Penn Manor athletic teams have won four state championships. The girls' soccer team won the state title in both 2002 and 2005, and the boys' baseball team was the state champion in 2005. The girls' field hockey team won the state championship in 2008. The class of 2004's baseball team was the first to achieve a sectional championship since 1979. In addition, the wrestling team achieved section champions in 2006.

The girls' track and field teams of 1977 and 1978 were Lancaster County Champions and sent several girls on to compete and win at the District Track and Field Meet. Several girls went on to compete and place at the Pennsylvania State High School Track and Field Meet.

The Penn Manor field hockey team made two consecutive state championship appearances in 2007 and 2008 under head coach Matthew Soto, and brought the title home to Millersville in 2008. In 2009, the Comets had an undefeated regular season in the Lancaster Lebanon League and proceeded to win the Section 1, Lancaster Lebanon League, and District III championship titles.

=== Theatrics ===
Penn Manor's theatre program, responsible for the fall play and spring musical, is called Penn Manor Productions. The program teaches students how to build sets, hang lights, paint, design sound, apply realistic stage makeup, find scenic props, and assist with costumes. Recently the "techie" program has taken the next step. Students are now trained on all matters of theatre, so that they can run the auditorium for any production (play, musical, or assembly) without assistance. Being one of the largest programs at the school, Penn Manor Theatre offers hundreds of students an opportunity to learn about all aspects of the art of theatre.

Penn Manor's theatre club is International Thespian Society (ITS) Troupe #274. ITS meets once a week during homeroom club period. ITS members earn theatre points for hours spent on theatre work. Upon earning enough points for induction into ITS, students may wear ITS insignia at graduation; however, induction is not required for club participation. ITS activities include an apple dumpling fundraiser, aiding charities such as the TOTS-EAT food drive and Broadway Cares/Equity Fights Aids, attending the state conference, and assisting Penn Manor Productions by serving as ushers for performances. Participation in both ITS and PMP is not required, but most ITS members are active in shows, and most PMP cast/crew are ITS members. ITS Troupe #274 is run by a group of elected student officers supervised by faculty director and advisers.

During the International Thespian Society Conference held in December at Connellsville High School, Penn Manor students Katie Irwin and Charles Blymier were inducted into the 2010 PA Thespian Performance Hall of Fame and Technical Hall of Fame, respectively. In addition, Blymier won a Technical Cash Award, and Irwin was elected to the state board.

== National recognition ==
Penn Manor and Manor Middle school have participated in Team America Rocketry Challenge (TARC) since 2003. TARC is a national rocketry contest for grades 7-12. The school has reached the national finals every year, and won the national championship in 2004 with a team composed of Cam Aumet, Bob O'Connor, and Benjamin Raush. The Penn Manor Rocket teams have been recognized as among the best TARC programs in the country. In 2010, Penn Manor's TARC team won first place in the nation. The team members were Brendan Stoeckl, Jordan Franssen, Nate Bernhardt, and Tyler Funk. The team traveled to London to compete against the national champions from the UK and France in an international rocketry competition at the Farnborough air show. On July 23, 2010, the team defeated the UK and France to bring the international title to the United States for the first time in the competition's history.

Penn Manor's Technology Student Association (TSA) chapter has placed first in the nation in events.

Penn Manor's website initiatives and technology programs were selected by Macromedia/Adobe Software for a case study in 2005.
