= Baumgardener's Covered Bridge =

Covered bridge in Pennsylvania, US

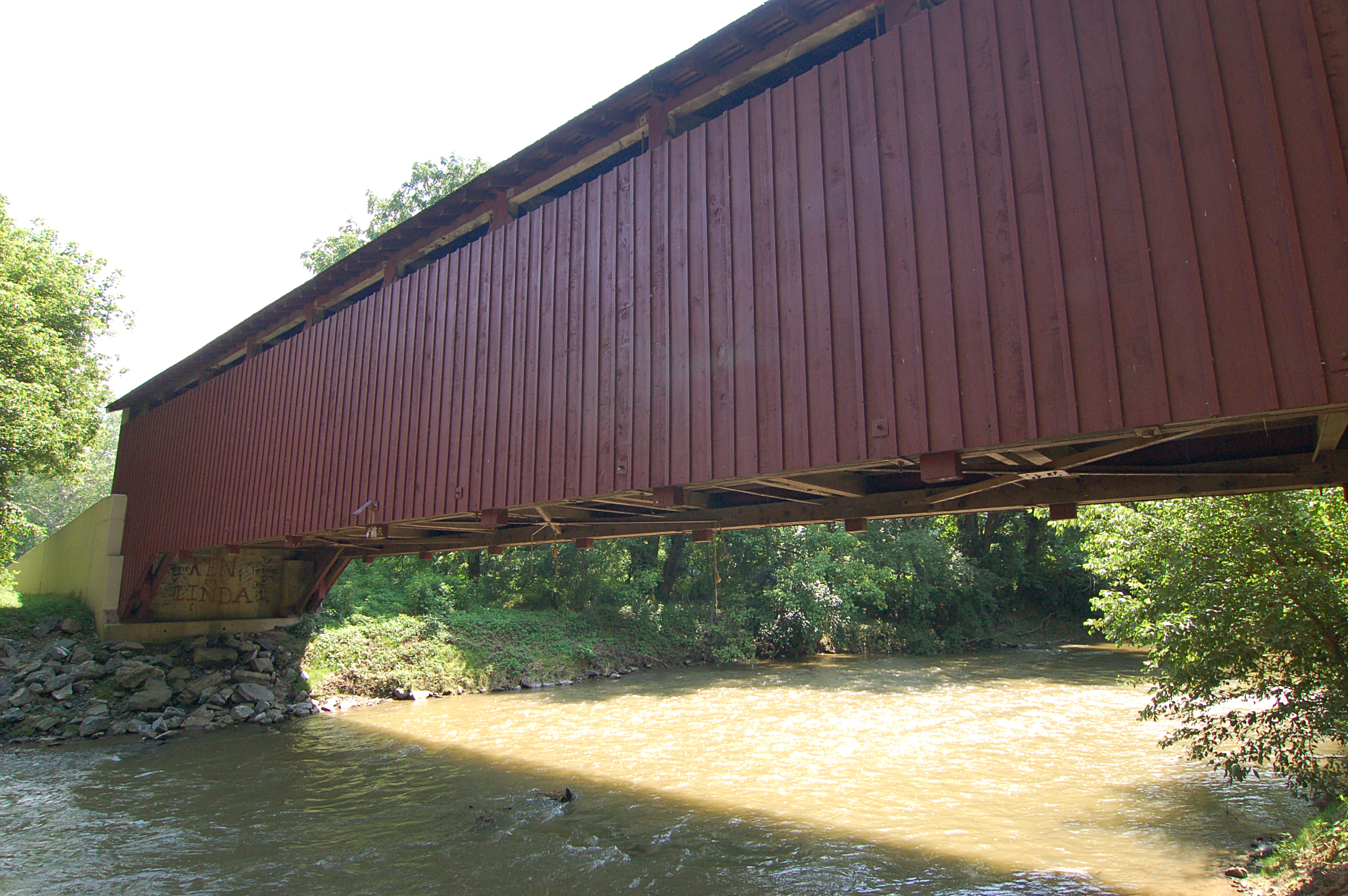
- Coordinates: 39°55′50″N 76°17′42″W
- Carries: Township 427
- Crosses: Pequea Creek
- Official name: Pequea #10 Bridge
- Maintained by: Lancaster County
- WGCB Number: 38-36-25

Characteristics
- Design: Burr Arch Truss Bridge
- Total length: 120 ft (37 m)
- Width: 4.3 m (14 ft)
- Height: 11.5 ft (3.5 m)

History
- Constructed by: Davis Kitch
- Construction end: 1860
- Rebuilt: 1987
- Baumgardener's Covered Bridge
- U.S. National Register of Historic Places
- MPS: Covered Bridges of Lancaster County TR
- NRHP reference No.: 80003541
- Added to NRHP: December 11, 1980

Location
- Interactive map of Baumgardener's Covered Bridge

The Baumgardener's Covered Bridge is a covered bridge that spans Pequea Creek in Lancaster County, Pennsylvania, United States. A county-owned and maintained bridge, its official designation is the Pequea #10 Bridge. Note: The mill was constructed in 1800.

The bridge has a single span, wooden, double Burr arch trusses design with the addition of steel hanger rods. The deck is made from oak planks. It is painted red, the traditional color of Lancaster County covered bridges, on both the inside and outside. Both approaches to the bridge are painted in the traditional white color.

The bridge is located approximately 0.5 miles (0.80 km) north of Frogtown Road on Covered Bridge Road just to the east of Pennsylvania Route 324 in Martic Township. The bridge's WGCB Number is 38-36-25. It was listed on the National Register of Historic Places on December 11, 1980.

== History ==
The Baumgardener's Covered Bridge was built in 1860 by Davis Kitch at a cost of $1,284. In 1987 the bridge was restored after it was damaged in a flood the previous year. During this restoration process, which cost $200,000, the bridge was raised by 4 feet (1.2 m) and lengthened by 9 feet (2.7 m) to protect it from damage in potential future flooding.

== Gallery ==
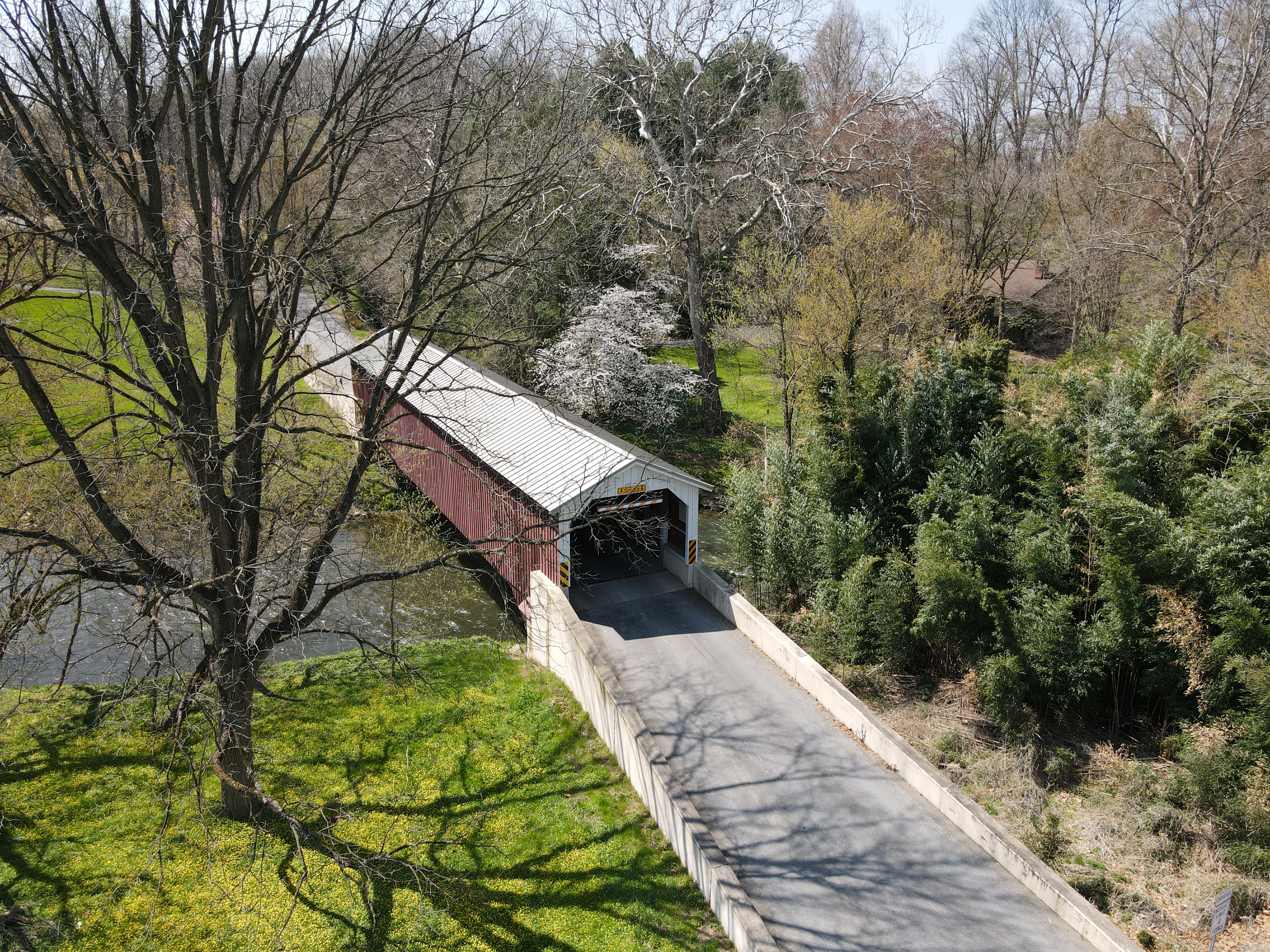
Baumgardener's Covered Bridge from the air #1

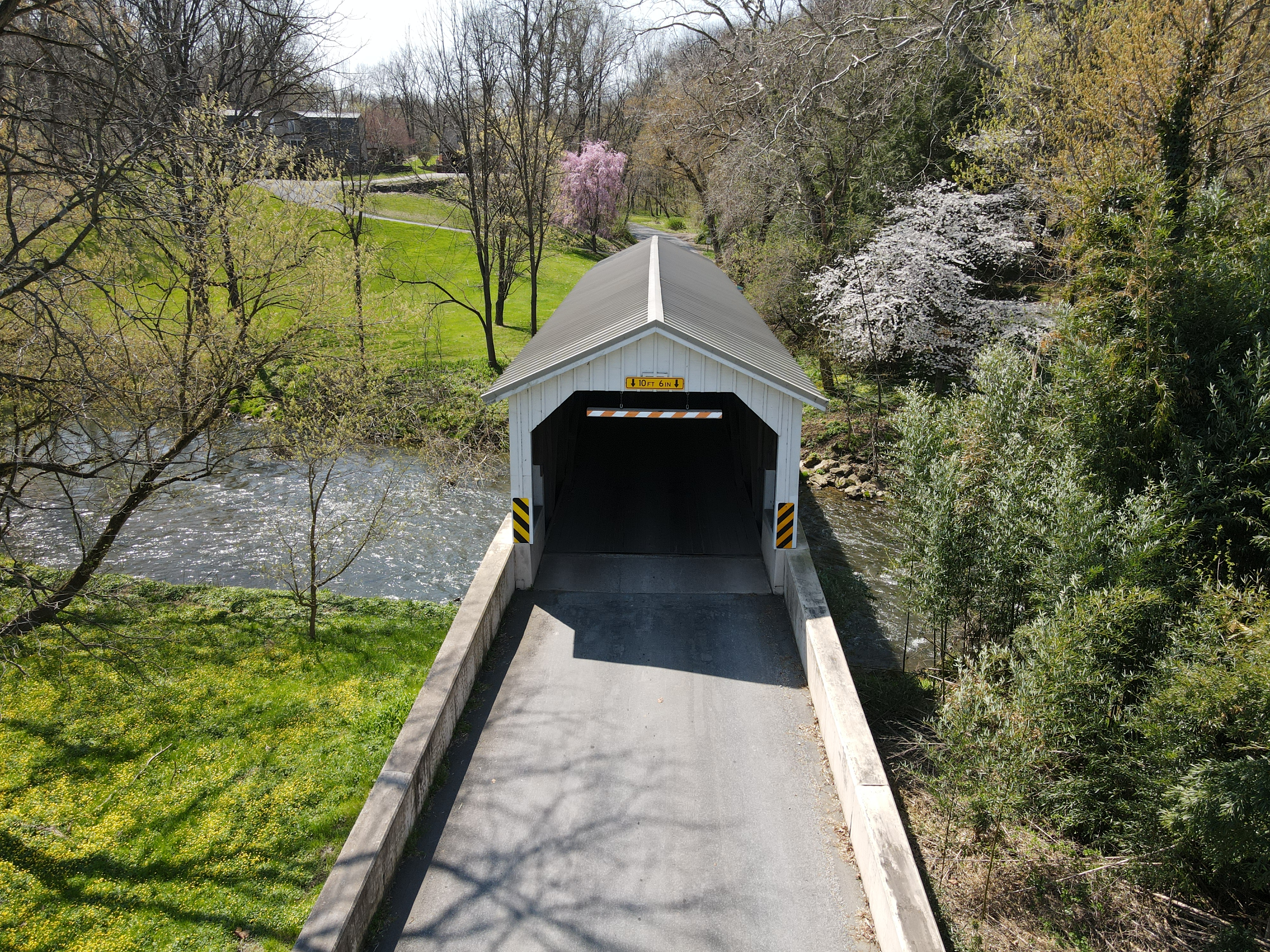
Baumgardener's Covered Bridge from the air #2

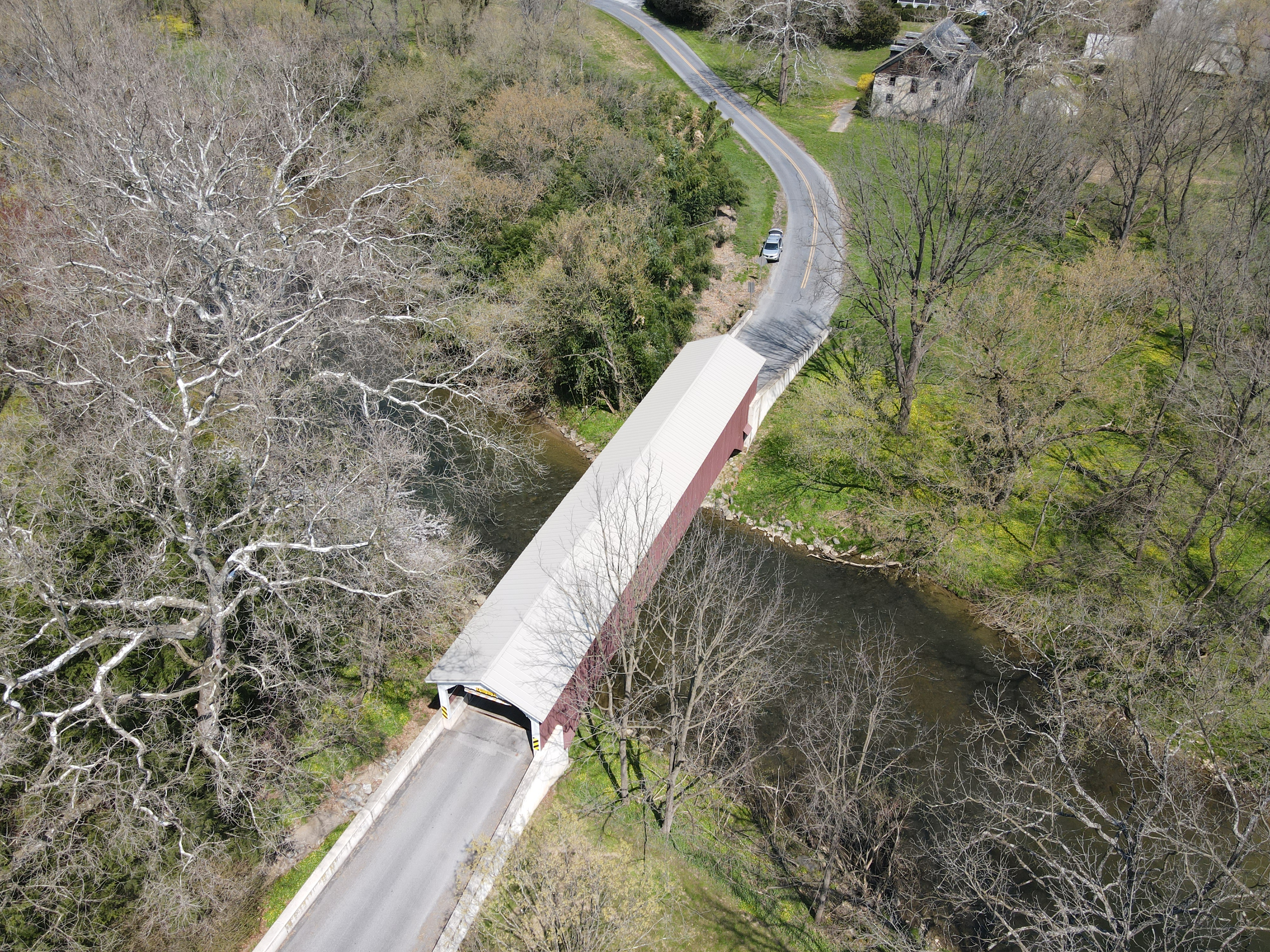
Baumgardener's Covered Bridge from the air #3

== See also ==
- List of covered bridges in Lancaster County, Pennsylvania
- List of covered bridges on the National Register of Historic Places in Pennsylvania
- National Register of Historic Places listings in Lancaster County, Pennsylvania
