= Penn Manor School District =

School district in Pennsylvania

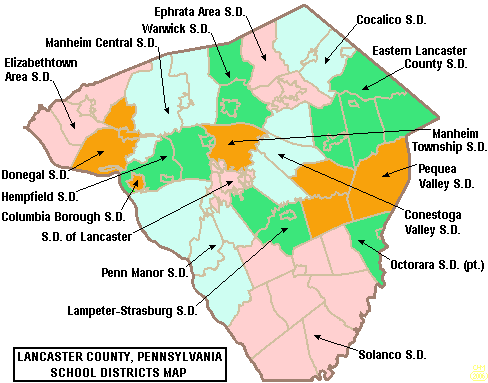

Address
- 2950 Charlestown Road Lancaster, Lancaster County, Pennsylvania, 17603; United States

District information
- Grades: K–12

Students and staff
- District mascot: Comet
- Colors: Blue and gold

Other information
- Website: Penn Manor School District

The Penn Manor School District is a large, rural/suburban, public school district located in Lancaster County, Pennsylvania. The Penn Manor School District encompasses approximately 110 square miles. Penn Manor School District serves residents of: Manor Township, Conestoga Township, Millersville Borough, Martic Township and Pequea Township. According to 2000 federal census data, it serves a resident population of 37,942. By 2010, the district's population was 41,376 people. In 2009, Penn Manor Sas $20,529 and the median family income was $55,708. The educational attainment levels for the Penn Manor School District population (25 years old and over) were 88.7% high school graduates and 25% college graduates.

Penn Manor School District operates one high school, two middle schools and seven elementary schools. Additionally the district offers a virtual school and an alternative school for grades 7th-12th. Penn Manor School District is a member of Lancaster-Lebanon Intermediate Unit (IU) 13, receiving a wide variety of services like specialized education for disabled students and hearing, speech and visual disability services and professional development for staff and faculty. High school students may choose to attend Lancaster County Career and Technology Center for training: in construction and mechanical trades, in allied health services; and in public safety careers among others.

== Extracurriculars ==
Penn Manor School District offers a wide variety of clubs, activities and an extensive sports program. The district funds:

Varsity

Boys

- Baseball - AAAAAA
- Basketball- AAAAAA
- Bowling - AAAA
- Cross country - AAA
- Football - AAAAAA
- Golf - AAA
- Lacrosse - AAAA
- Soccer - AAAA
- Swimming and diving - AAA
- Tennis - AAA
- Track and field - AAA
- Volleyball - AAA
- Wrestling - AAA

Girls

- Basketball - AAAAAA
- Bowling - AAAA
- Cheer - AAAA
- Cross country - AAA
- Field hockey - AAA
- Golf - AAA
- Lacrosse - AAAA
- Soccer - AAA
- Softball - AAAAAA
- Swimming and diving - AAA
- Tennis - AAA
- Track and field - AA
- Volleyball - AAA

Middle school sports

Boys

- Basketball
- Cross country
- Football
- Soccer
- Track and field
- Wrestling

Girls

- Basketball
- Cross country
- Field hockey
- Soccer
- Track and field

According to PIAA directory July 2013
