= Pennsylvania Route 999 =

State highway in Lancaster County, Pennsylvania, United States

Pennsylvania Route 999

Route information
- Maintained by PennDOT
- Length: 9.445 mi (15.200 km)
- Existed: 1928–present

Major junctions
- West end: PA 441 in Washington Boro
- PA 741 in Millersville
- East end: PA 462 in Lancaster

Location
- Country: United States
- State: Pennsylvania
- Counties: Lancaster

Highway system
- Pennsylvania State Route System; Interstate; US; State; Scenic; Legislative
| ← PA 998 | → US 1 |

Pennsylvania Route 999 (PA 999) is a 9.44-mile-long (15.19 km), east–west state highway located in western Lancaster County, Pennsylvania. The western terminus is at PA 441, which has its southern terminus at this intersection, in Washington Boro. The eastern terminus is at PA 462 in Lancaster. PA 999 heads east from Washington Boro to rural areas to Millersville. Upon reaching Millersville, the route heads into developed areas and turns northeast, crossing PA 741. PA 999 continues northeast to its eastern terminus. The route is a two-lane undivided road its entire length. Between Millersville and Lancaster, the route follows a 19th-century private turnpike that runs along the Manor Road that was created in 1742. PA 999 was designated in 1928 between Millersville and U.S. Route 30 (US 30)/PA 1 (now PA 462) in Lancaster. The route was extended west to its current terminus at PA 441 in the 1950s.

== Route description ==
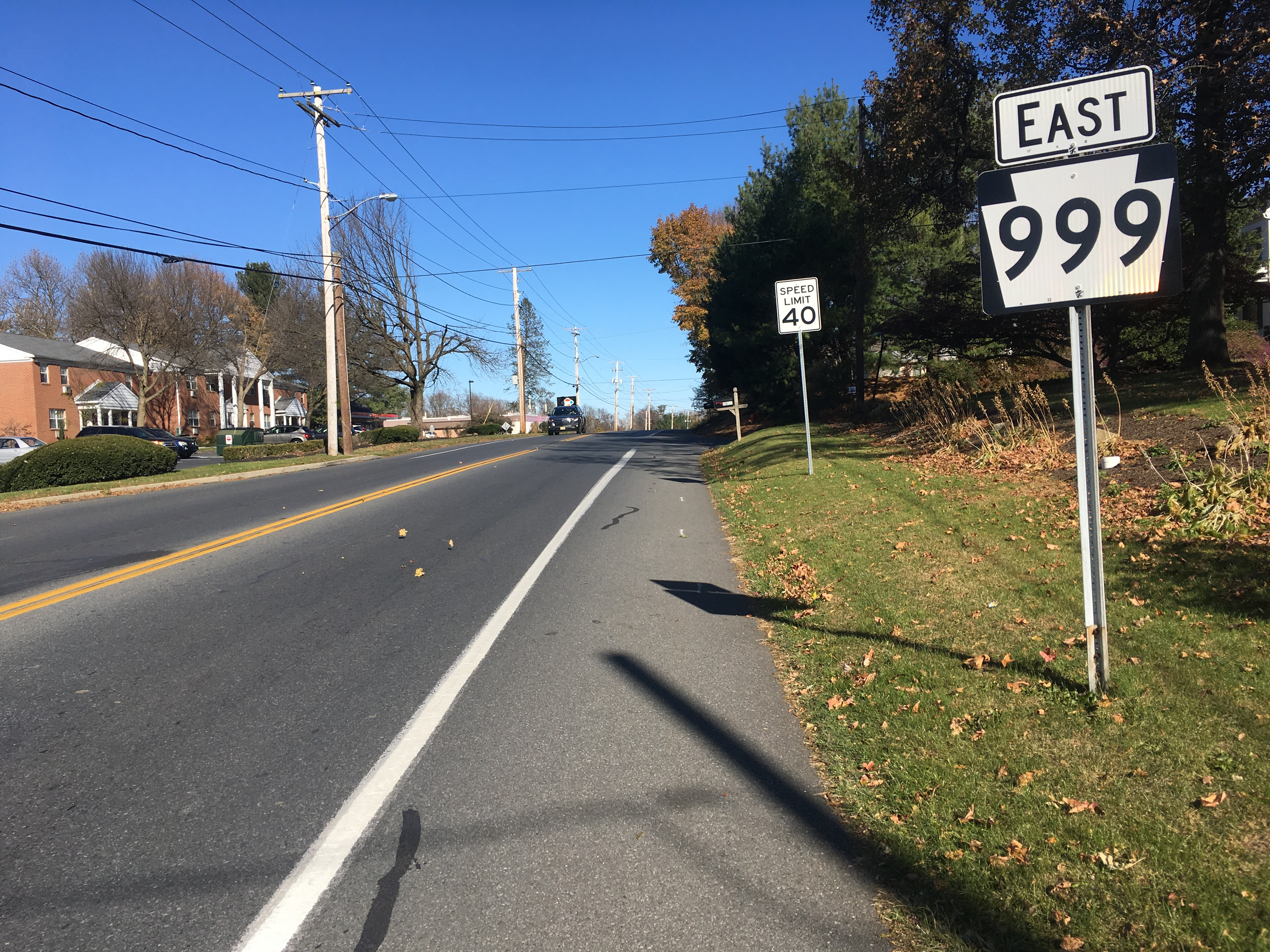
PA 999 eastbound in Lancaster Township

PA 999 begins at an intersection with the southern terminus of PA 441 in the community of Washington Boro, located on the east bank of the Susquehanna River in Manor Township, Lancaster County, heading east-northeast on two-lane undivided Penn Street. The route passes through residential areas before it leaves Washington Boro and enters agricultural areas with some trees and homes. PA 999 continues through rural areas and becomes Blue Rock Road before it runs through the communities of Central Manor and Windom. Farther east, the road passes to the north of a residential neighborhood and crosses Little Conestoga Creek in a wooded area. The route continues east between farms to the north and homes to the south before it enters the borough of Millersville. At this point, PA 999 passes through residential areas with some businesses. At the intersection with North George Street, which heads south to the Millersville University of Pennsylvania campus, the route turns northeast and becomes Manor Avenue. The road crosses PA 741 and becomes Millersville Pike, soon leaving Millersville for Lancaster Township and running through wooded residential neighborhoods. The route passes through Bausman and runs between a park to the northwest and a shopping center to the southeast. PA 999 enters the city of Lancaster and becomes Manor Street, passing through urban areas of homes and businesses. The route reaches its eastern terminus at an intersection with the eastbound direction of PA 462 at West King Street to the west of downtown Lancaster.

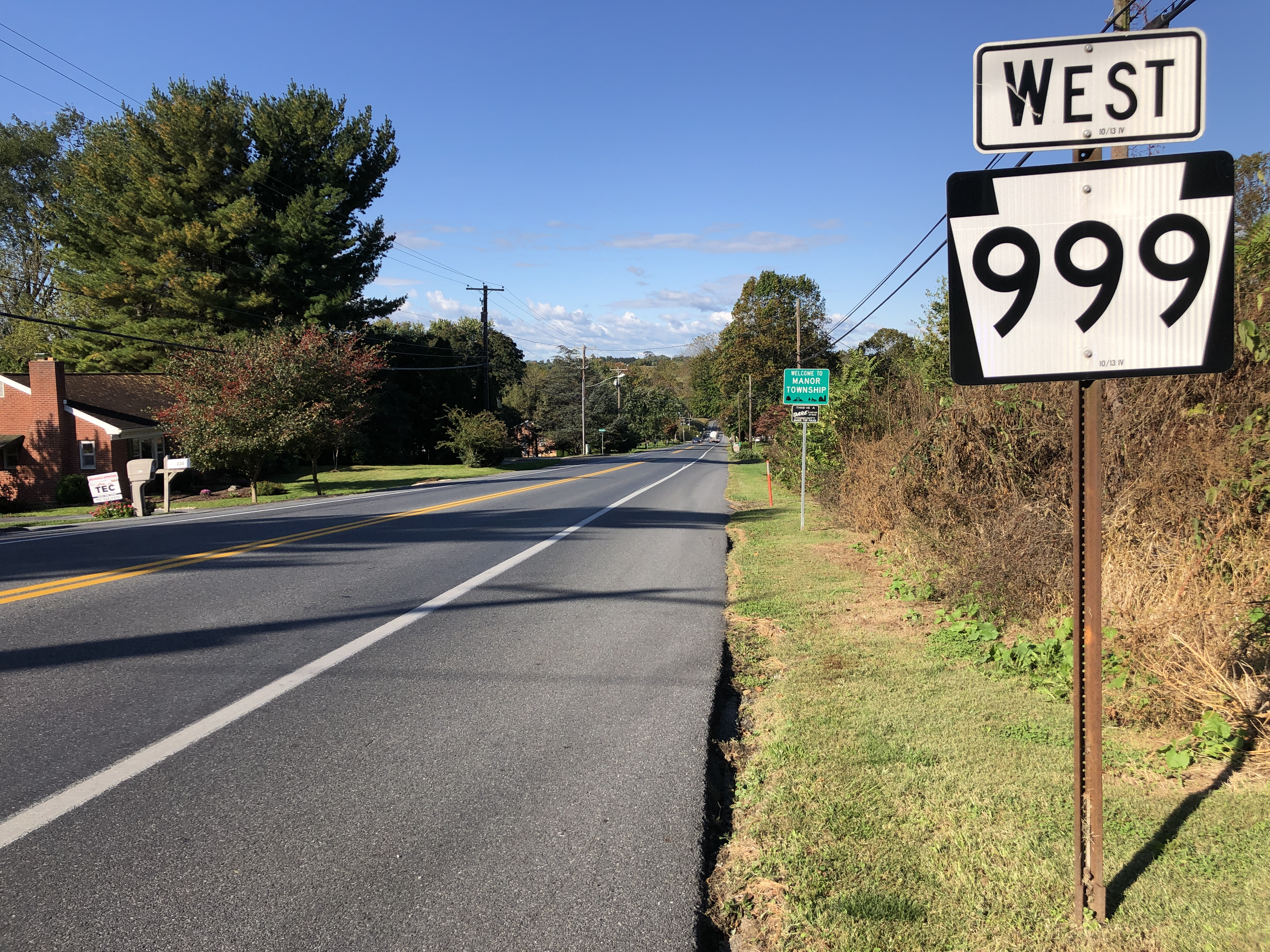
PA 999 westbound in Manor Township

== History ==
The eastern section of PA 999 runs along the Manor Road, which was constructed in 1742. On March 13, 1839, the Manor Turnpike Road Company was chartered to build a turnpike running from West King Street in Lancaster southwest to the Little Conestoga Creek near Millersville along the Manor Road. When routes were first legislated in Pennsylvania in 1911, present-day PA 999 was not given a legislative number. By 1926, the road connecting Millersville to Lancaster was paved. PA 999 was designated in 1928 to run from Millersville northeast to US 30/PA 1 (now PA 462) in Lancaster, heading east on Frederick Street, north on George Street, and northeast along its current alignment. The road between Washington Boro and Millersville was an unnumbered, unpaved road. In the 1950s, PA 999 was realigned to head west to its current terminus at PA 441 in Washington Boro.

== Major intersections ==
The entire route is in Lancaster County.

| Location | mi | km | Destinations | Notes |
|---|---|---|---|---|
| Manor Township | 0.000 | 0.000 | PA 441 north (Water Street) – Columbia, Middletown | Western terminus; southern terminus of PA 441 |
| Millersville | 6.958 | 11.198 | PA 741 (Millersville Road) – East Petersburg, New Danville | |
| Lancaster | 9.455 | 15.216 | PA 462 east (West King Street) | Eastern terminus |
1.000 mi = 1.609 km; 1.000 km = 0.621 mi

== See also ==
- List of highways numbered 999
