= West Willow, Pennsylvania =

Unincorporated community in Pennsylvania, US

- Unincorporated community
- Location within Pennsylvania Location within the United States
- Coordinates: 39°58′22″N 76°17′17″W
- Country: United States
- State: Pennsylvania
- County: Lancaster
- Township: Pequea
- Elevation: 440 ft (130 m)
- Time zone: UTC-5 (Eastern (EST))
  - Summer (DST): UTC-4 (EDT)
- ZIP code: 17583
- Area code: 717
- GNIS feature ID: 1191134

West Willow is an unincorporated community in Pequea Township in Lancaster County, Pennsylvania, United States. West Willow is located at the intersection of Millwood Road and West Willow Road to the west of Willow Street.
