= Choo Choo Barn =

Train display in Strasburg, Pennsylvania, United States

Coordinates: 39.98246°N 76.16578°W

The Choo Choo Barn is a 1,700-square-foot (160 m^{2}) train display in Strasburg, Pennsylvania, in the United States, consisting of over 177 hand-built animated figures and vehicles and 17 operating trains.

== History ==
The Choo Choo Barn was established in 1945 by George Groff, in the basement of his family home on Franklin Street in Strasburg, Pennsylvania. Groff had just returned from World War II, and had bought a $12.50 Lionel train set as a Christmas present for his two-year-old son Gary. Within a few years, the collection had expanded to occupy a large part of the family basement. In the 1950s, the family opened their display to the public and local school groups during the Christmas holidays.

In 1961, George and Florence Groff moved the display to a small township maintenance facility that became available along Route 741, just to the west of the recently reopened Strasburg Rail Road. The Choo Choo Barn opened on Thanksgiving Day in 1961, with over 600 square feet (56 m^{2}) of detailed landscaping, six trains, and six animated figures. Over the next few years, the display continued to grow. A gift shop was added to the front of the building, and a picnic grove was constructed to the west of the parking lot.

When the elder Groffs retired in 1979, their youngest son Thomas and his wife Linda became the new owners and curators of the Choo Choo Barn. The display continues to open each spring, and is updated every year. The displays pay homage to Lancaster County, Pennsylvania, with miniature replicas of The Willows Restaurant, Dutch Wonderland amusement park, the Strasburg Railroad, and a scale version of the Groff family home.
