= Shenks Ferry Site (36LA2) =

- U.S. National Register of Historic Places
- Location within Pennsylvania Location within the United States
- Location: Along Grubbs Creek, ¾ mile above the Susquehanna River, Martic Township, Pennsylvania
- Coordinates: 39°54′18″N 76°21′36.72″W
- Area: 4.6 acres (1.9 ha)
- NRHP reference No.: 82004655
- Added to NRHP: March 3, 1982

Shenks Ferry Site (36LA2) is a historic archaeological site located above Grubb Creek at Martic Township in Lancaster County, Pennsylvania. It underwent excavation in 1930-1931 and in 1973 by the Pennsylvania Historic and Museum Commission. The excavations identified the presence of a village and seasonal campsites dated to the Late Woodland period.

It was listed on the National Register of Historic Places in 1982.
