= Pequea, Pennsylvania =

Unincorporated community in Pennsylvania, US

- Unincorporated community
- Location within the U.S. state of Pennsylvania Pequea (the United States)
- Coordinates: 39°53′17″N 76°22′02″W
- Country: United States
- State: Pennsylvania
- County: Lancaster
- Township: Martic
- Time zone: UTC-5 (Eastern (EST))
  - Summer (DST): UTC-4 (EDT)
- ZIP code: 17565
- Area code: 717
- GNIS feature ID: 1183575

Pequea is an unincorporated community that is located in Martic Township in Lancaster County, Pennsylvania, United States. It is situated where Route 324 ends at the Susquehanna River, twelve miles south of Lancaster.

== Early days ==
Sometime around 1877, Frederick Shoff and Paul Heine began turning Pequea, then more commonly known as Shoff's P.O., into a resort town, when the Columbia and Port Deposit Railroad began carrying passengers to the area. Shoff owned a sawmill and lumber yard and managed the York Furnace Power company.

=== Riverview Hotel ===
Between 1902 and 1903, Shoff built the three-story, seventy-five-bedroom Riverview Hotel on the bank of the Susquehanna and then sold it to Heine in 1904. The hotel also had a dining room, banquet hall, summer garden, tennis courts, croquet courts, swings with canopies, and a miniature railway to York Furnace that used a steam locomotive that had been manufactured by Timothy Cagney and his brothers David and John.

== Geography ==
The Pequea Creek empties into the river in Pequea, which is pronounced "Peckway." The ZIP code is 17565.

Pequea has a hot-summer humid continental climate (Dfa) and average monthly temperatures range from 31.0 °F in January to 75.4 °F in July. The hardiness zone is 7a.

== See also ==
- Pekowi

== Gallery ==
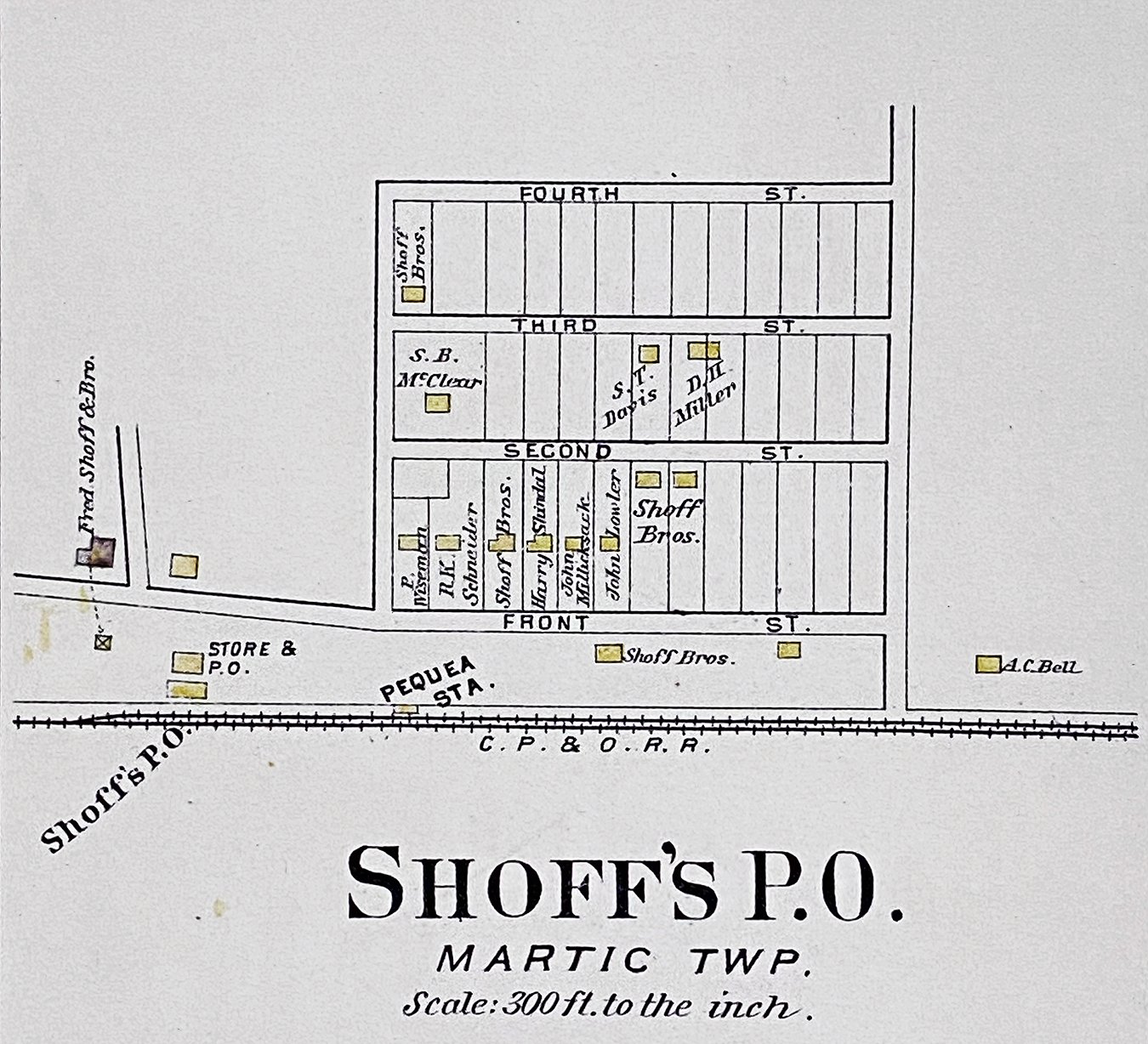
Shoff's P.O. on 1899 map of Martic Township

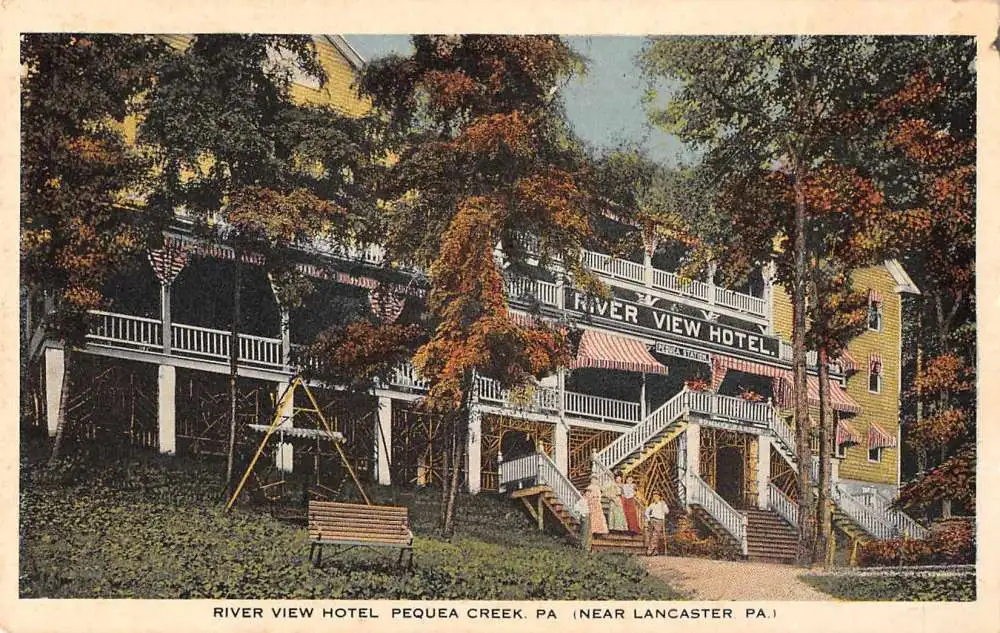
River View Hotel, c. 1910

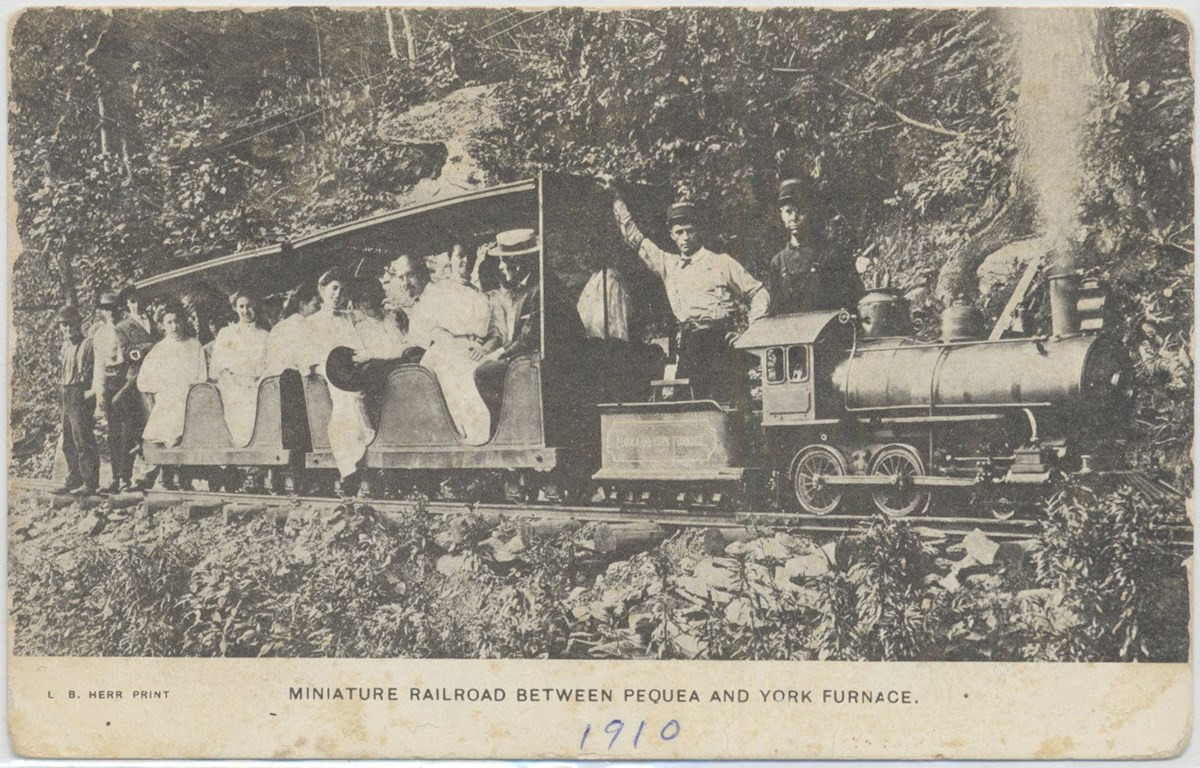
Miniature railroad between Pequea and York Furnace, c. 1910
