= Duncan Island (36LA60,61) =

- U.S. National Register of Historic Places
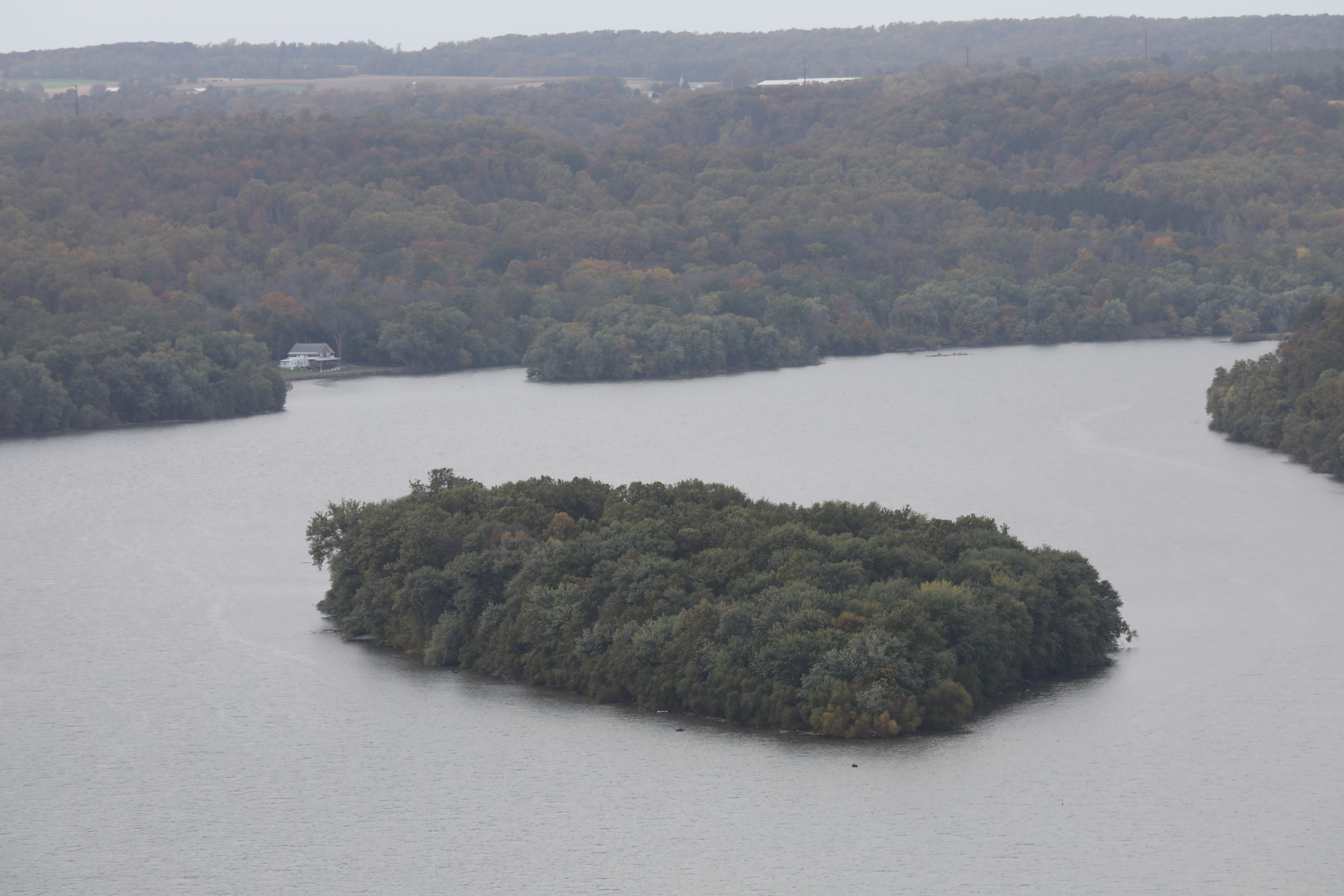

- Location within Pennsylvania Location within the United States
- Location: In the Susquehanna River, Martic Township, Pennsylvania
- Coordinates: 39°51′41″N 76°21′49″W
- Area: 19 acres (7.7 ha)
- NRHP reference No.: 84003428
- Added to NRHP: May 10, 1984

Duncan Island (36LA60,61) is a prehistoric archaeological site located in the Susquehanna River at Martic Township in Lancaster County, Pennsylvania. It underwent study in the 1950s and 1970s. Artifacts dated to the Archaic period (c. 8000 B.C. to 1000 A.D.) were uncovered.

It was listed on the National Register of Historic Places in 1984.
