= Martic Forge, Pennsylvania =

Unincorporated community in Pennsylvania, US

- Unincorporated community
- Location within Pennsylvania
- Coordinates: 39°54′19″N 76°19′39″W
- Country: United States
- State: Pennsylvania
- County: Lancaster
- Township: Martic
- Elevation: 223 ft (68 m)
- Time zone: UTC-5 (Eastern (EST))
  - Summer (DST): UTC-4 (EDT)
- ZIP code: 17565
- Area code: 717
- GNIS feature ID: 1204110

Martic Forge is an unincorporated community in Martic Township in Lancaster County, Pennsylvania, United States. Martic Forge is located at the intersection of Pennsylvania Route 324 and River Road, just east of the Pequea Creek.
