= Holtwood, Pennsylvania =

Unincorporated community in Pennsylvania, US

- Unincorporated community
- Location within Pennsylvania Location within the United States
- Coordinates: 39°49′55″N 76°19′39″W
- Country: United States
- State: Pennsylvania
- County: Lancaster
- Township: Martic

Area
  - Total: 0.72 sq mi (1.86 km^{2})
  - Land: 0.71 sq mi (1.85 km^{2})
  - Water: 0.0039 sq mi (.01 km^{2})

Population (2000)
  - Total: 97
  - Density: 140/sq mi (52/km^{2})
- Time zone: UTC-5 (Eastern (EST))
  - Summer (DST): UTC-4 (EDT)
- ZIP code: 17532
- GNIS feature ID: 1177240

Holtwood is an unincorporated community in Martic Township, Lancaster County, in the U.S. state of Pennsylvania.

Holtwood is the site of the Muddy Run Pumped Storage Hydroelectric Power Plant (172 Bethesda Church Road West, Holtwood, PA 17532), along the Susquehanna River. It pumps water into a reservoir during off-peak hours and uses that water to generate electricity during peak demand hours; it produces over 1,000 megawatts (MW) of power. Until 1996, a village that was also named Holtwood was situated upon the ledge of a hill above where is now the hydroelectric reservoir Lake Aldred. Holtwood Village populated the families of workers at the PP&L maintained Holtwood Dam on the Susquehanna. At its peak, it reached a population of approximately 500 residents; however, by the early 90s, only about 3 people remained, including longtime Dam employee Gerald Erb, the final resident of the village.
