= Marticville, Pennsylvania =

Unincorporated community in Pennsylvania, US

- Unincorporated community
- Location within Pennsylvania
- Coordinates: 39°55′35″N 76°18′25″W
- Country: United States
- State: Pennsylvania
- County: Lancaster
- Township: Martic
- Elevation: 397 ft (121 m)
- Time zone: UTC-5 (Eastern (EST))
  - Summer (DST): UTC-4 (EDT)
- ZIP code: 17565
- Area code: 717
- GNIS feature ID: 1180486

Marticville is an unincorporated community in Martic Township in Lancaster County, Pennsylvania, United States. Marticville is located at the intersection of Pennsylvania Route 324 and Frogtown Road.
