= Willow Street, Pennsylvania =

Unincorporated community in Pennsylvania, US

- Census-designated place
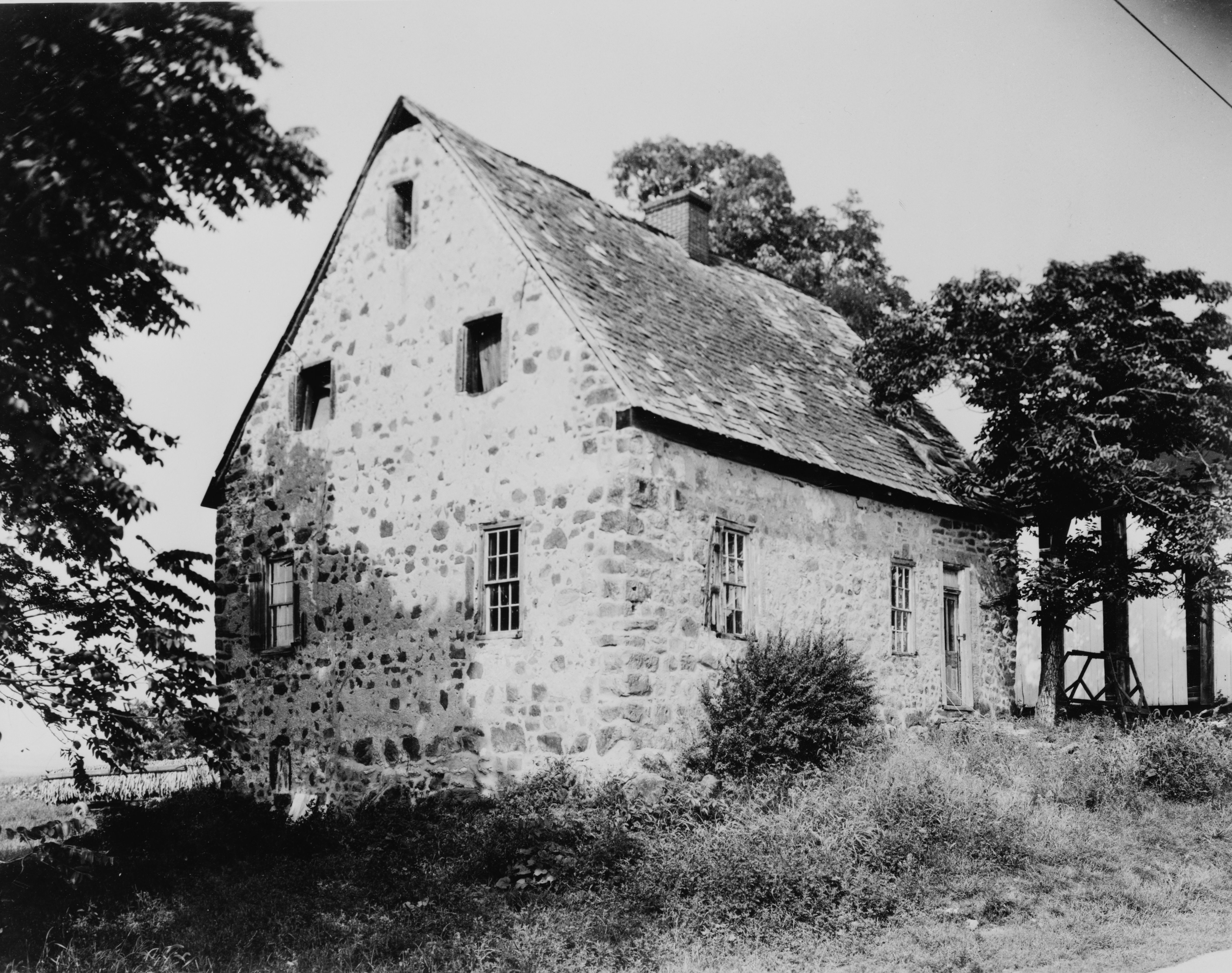
- Hans Herr House

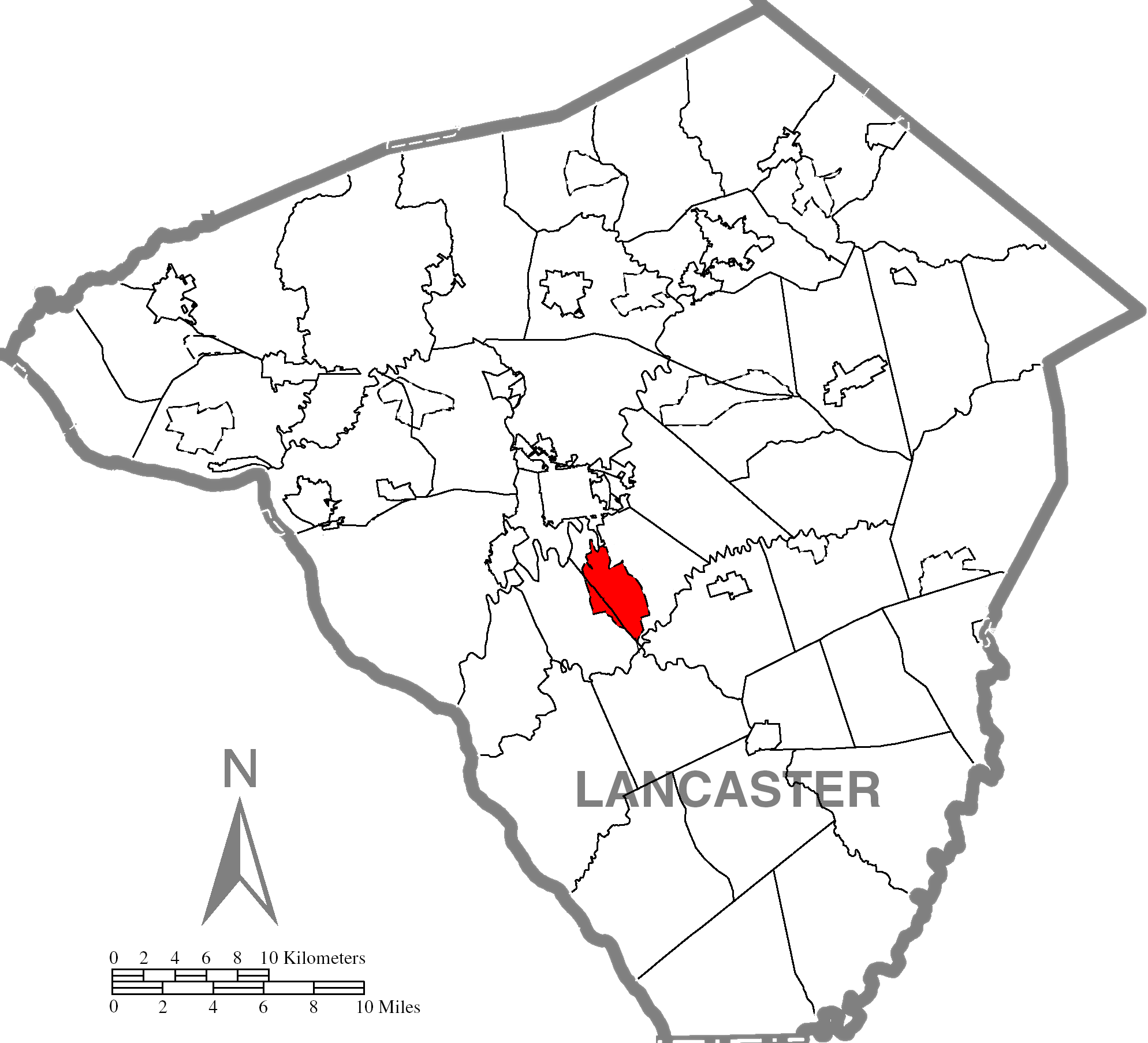
- Location in Lancaster County

- Location in Pennsylvania Location in the United States
- Coordinates: 39°58′45″N 76°16′35″W
- Country: United States
- State: Pennsylvania
- County: Lancaster
- Townships: West Lampeter; Pequea

Area
  - Total: 5.46 sq mi (14.14 km^{2})
  - Land: 5.43 sq mi (14.07 km^{2})
  - Water: 0.027 sq mi (0.07 km^{2})
- Elevation: 482 ft (147 m)

Population (2010)
  - Total: 7,578
  - Density: 1,395/sq mi (538.5/km^{2})
- Time zone: UTC−5 (Eastern (EST))
  - Summer (DST): UTC−4 (EDT)
- ZIP Code: 17584
- Area code: 717
- GNIS feature ID: 1191509
- FIPS code: 42-85464

Willow Street is an unincorporated community and census-designated place (CDP) in Lancaster County, Pennsylvania, United States. The population was 7,578 at the 2010 census. In the early part of the 20th century, the main thoroughfare in town was lined with willow trees on both sides for the length of the town, hence the community's name. As time passed and the town grew, the road was widened and sidewalks were installed, which required the trees be removed. Only a few of the original trees remain to this day. One tall willow tree was situated behind Kendig Square Plaza, but it was downed during a wind storm during late February/early March 2018.

It is the location of the Hans Herr House, the oldest homestead in Lancaster County, and also the Martin Meylin Gunshop, where the long rifle was first made.

== Geography ==
Willow Street is located in central Lancaster County at 39°58′41″N 76°16′28″W. It is primarily in West Lampeter Township, with a portion extending west into Pequea Township. It is bordered to the east by the village of Lampeter.

Pennsylvania Route 272 (Willow Street Pike) is the main highway through the community. It is split into two one-way streets, with the northbound lanes following the original main street through the town, and the southbound lanes running four blocks to the west. PA 272 leads north 4 miles (6 km) to the center of Lancaster, the county seat, and south 15 miles (24 km) to Wakefield. U.S. Route 222 joins PA 272 in the north part of the CDP (shown as "Mylin Corners" on USGS topographic maps) and leads north into Lancaster but southeast 10 miles (16 km) to Quarryville.

According to the United States Census Bureau, the CDP has a total area of 5.4 square miles (14.1 km^{2}), of which 0.03 square miles (0.07 km^{2}), or 0.47%, are water. The community primarily drains north to Mill Creek, a tributary of the Conestoga River, but the southern part of the community drains south to Pequea Creek. The Conestoga and Pequea are both southwest-flowing tributaries of the Susquehanna River.

== Demographics ==
As of the census of 2000, there were 7,258 people, 3,203 households, and 2,091 families living in the CDP. The population density was 1,340.9 people per square mile (517.7 people/km^{2}). There were 3,323 housing units at an average density of 613.9 per square mile (237.0/km^{2}). The racial makeup of the CDP was 98.26% White, 0.37% African American, 0.04% Native American, 0.51% Asian, 0.36% from other races, and 0.45% from two or more races. Hispanic or Latino of any race were 1.18% of the population.

There were 3,203 households, out of which 19.2% had children under the age of 18 living with them, 58.7% were married couples living together, 4.9% had a female householder with no husband present, and 34.7% were non-families. Of all households, 32.2% were made up of individuals, and 25.7% had someone living alone who was 65 years of age or older. The average household size was 2.15 and the average family size was 2.69.

In the CDP, the population was spread out, with 17.1% under the age of 18, 4.6% from 18 to 24, 18.9% from 25 to 44, 17.1% from 45 to 64, and 42.4% who were 65 years of age or older. The median age was 54 years. For every 100 females, there were 80.0 males. For every 100 females age 18 and over, there were 76.4 males.

The median income for a household in the CDP was $45,103, and the median income for a family was $58,611. Males had a median income of $43,580 versus $25,523 for females. The per capita income for the CDP was $25,292. About 1.2% of families and 2.8% of the population were below the poverty line, including 2.6% of those under age 18 and 3.8% of those age 65 or over.
