= Martic Township, Pennsylvania =

Township in Pennsylvania, US

Coordinates: 39°53′00″N 76°19′00″W

- Township
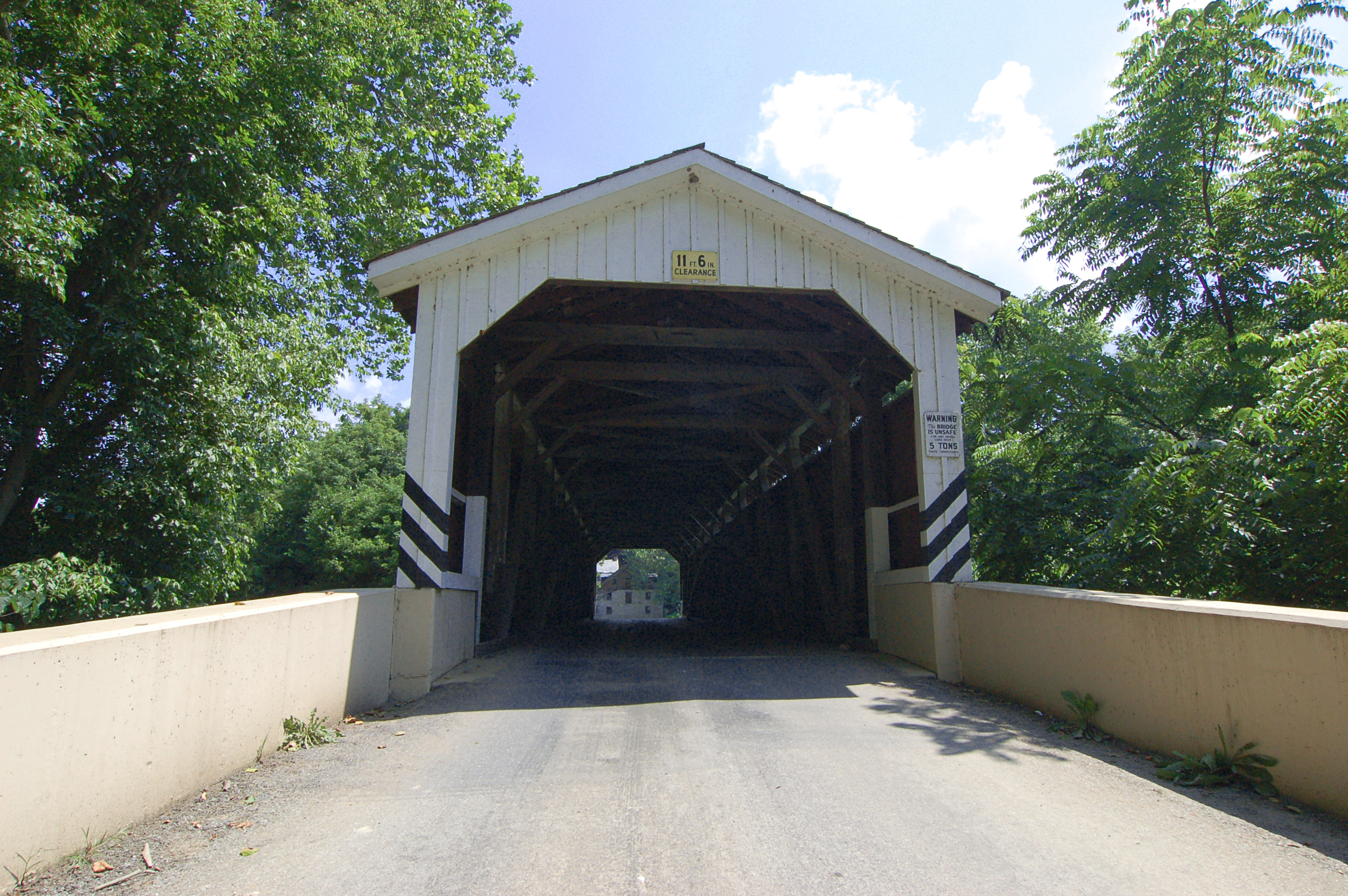
- Baumgardener's Covered Bridge in Martic Township

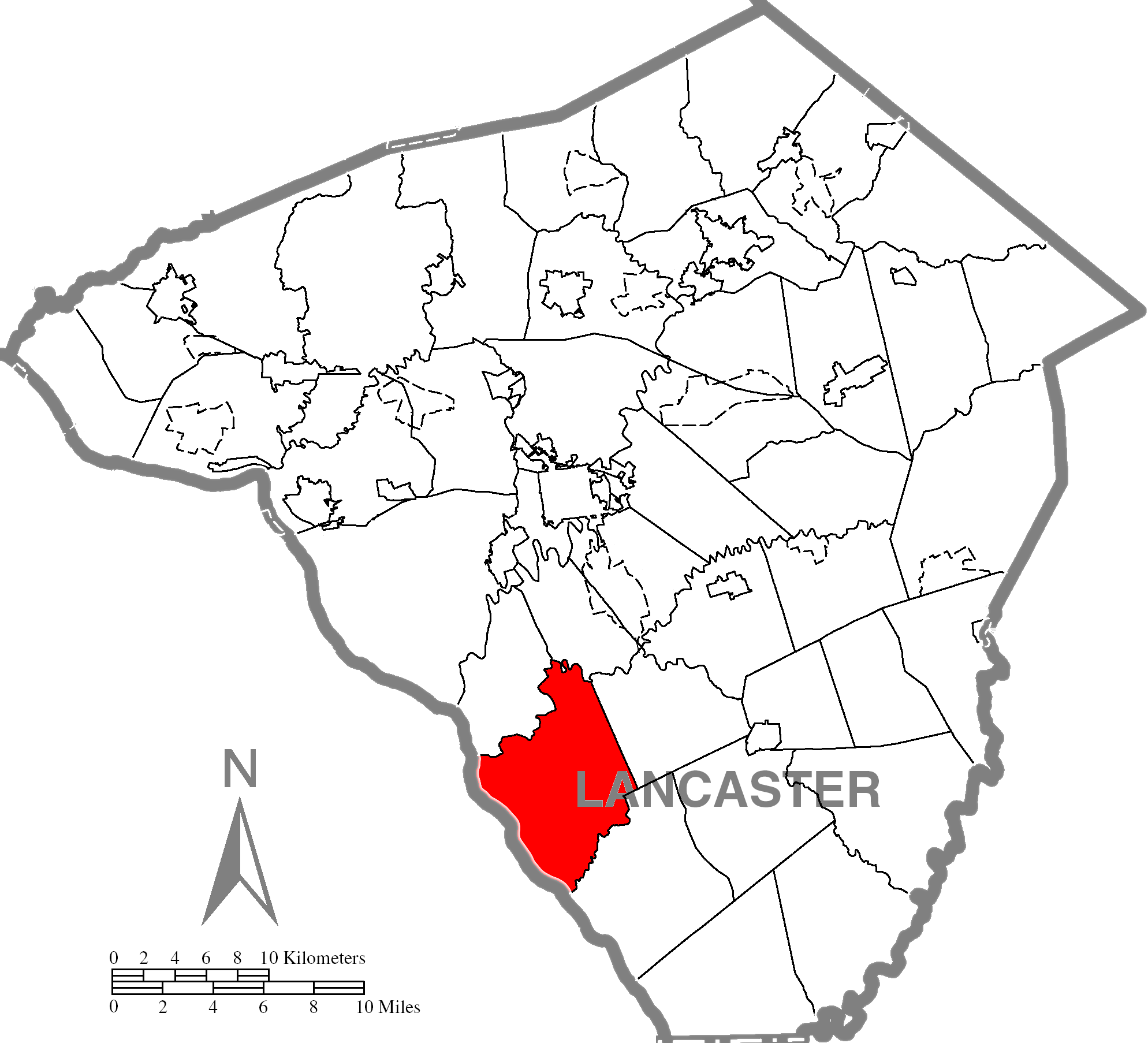
- Map of Lancaster County, Pennsylvania highlighting Martic Township

- Map of Lancaster County, Pennsylvania
- Country: United States
- State: Pennsylvania
- County: Lancaster
- Settled: 1691
- Incorporated: 1729

Government
  - Type: Board of Supervisors

Area
  - Total: 32.62 sq mi (84.49 km^{2})
  - Land: 29.03 sq mi (75.20 km^{2})
  - Water: 3.59 sq mi (9.29 km^{2})

Population (2020)
  - Total: 5,237 ▲
  - Estimate (2021): 5,203
  - Density: 179.1/sq mi (69.14/km^{2})
- Time zone: UTC-5 (Eastern (EST))
  - Summer (DST): UTC-4 (EDT)
- Area code: 717
- FIPS code: 42-071-47824
- Website: www.martictownship.com

Martic Township is a township in southwestern Lancaster County, Pennsylvania, United States. At the 2020 census, the population was 5,237. Martic Township was organized in 1729. It borders Conestoga, Providence, Pequea and Drumore townships.

== History ==
The Baumgardner's Mill Covered Bridge, Duncan Island (36LA60,61), and Shenks Ferry Site (36LA2) are listed on the National Register of Historic Places.

== Geography ==
According to the U.S. Census Bureau, the township has a total area of 32.7 square miles (84.7 km^{2}), of which 29.0 square miles (75.2 km^{2}) are land and 3.7 square miles (9.6 km^{2}), or 11.28%, are water. Pequea Creek runs through the township and is home to the Baumgardener's Covered Bridge. Unincorporated communities in the township include Marticville, Pequea, Mt. Nebo, Rawlinsville, Erbs Mill, Drytown, Bethesda, Holtwood, and part of Martic Forge.

== Demographics ==
Historical population
Census	Pop.	Note	%±
2000	4,990		—
2010	5,190		4.0%
2020	5,237		0.9%
2021 (est.)	5,203		−0.6%
U.S. Decennial Census

At the 2000 census there were 4,990 people, 1,713 households, and 1,365 families living in the township. The population density was 172.0 inhabitants per square mile (66.4/km^{2}). There were 1,789 housing units at an average density of 61.7 units per square mile (23.8 units/km^{2}). The racial makeup of the township was 98.32% White, 0.48% African American, 0.24% Native American, 0.16% Asian, 0.02% Pacific Islander, 0.20% from other races, and 0.58% from two or more races. Hispanic or Latino of any race were 1.36%.

There were 1,713 households, 40.3% had children under the age of 18 living with them, 68.9% were married couples living together, 6.1% had a female householder with no husband present, and 20.3% were non-families. 15.6% of households were made up of individuals, and 4.3% were one person aged 65 or older. The average household size was 2.90 and the average family size was 3.25.

The age distribution was 30.2% under the age of 18, 6.8% from 18 to 24, 32.4% from 25 to 44, 22.5% from 45 to 64, and 8.2% 65 or older. The median age was 36 years. For every 100 females, there were 107.7 males. For every 100 females age 18 and over, there were 105.6 males.

The median household income was $52,106 and the median family income was $56,185. Males had a median income of $40,366 versus $24,853 for females. The per capita income for the township was $20,151. About 1.5% of families and 2.4% of the population were below the poverty line, including 0.9% of those under age 18 and 3.4% of those age 65 or over.
