= New Danville, Pennsylvania =

Unincorporated community in Pennsylvania, US

- Unincorporated community
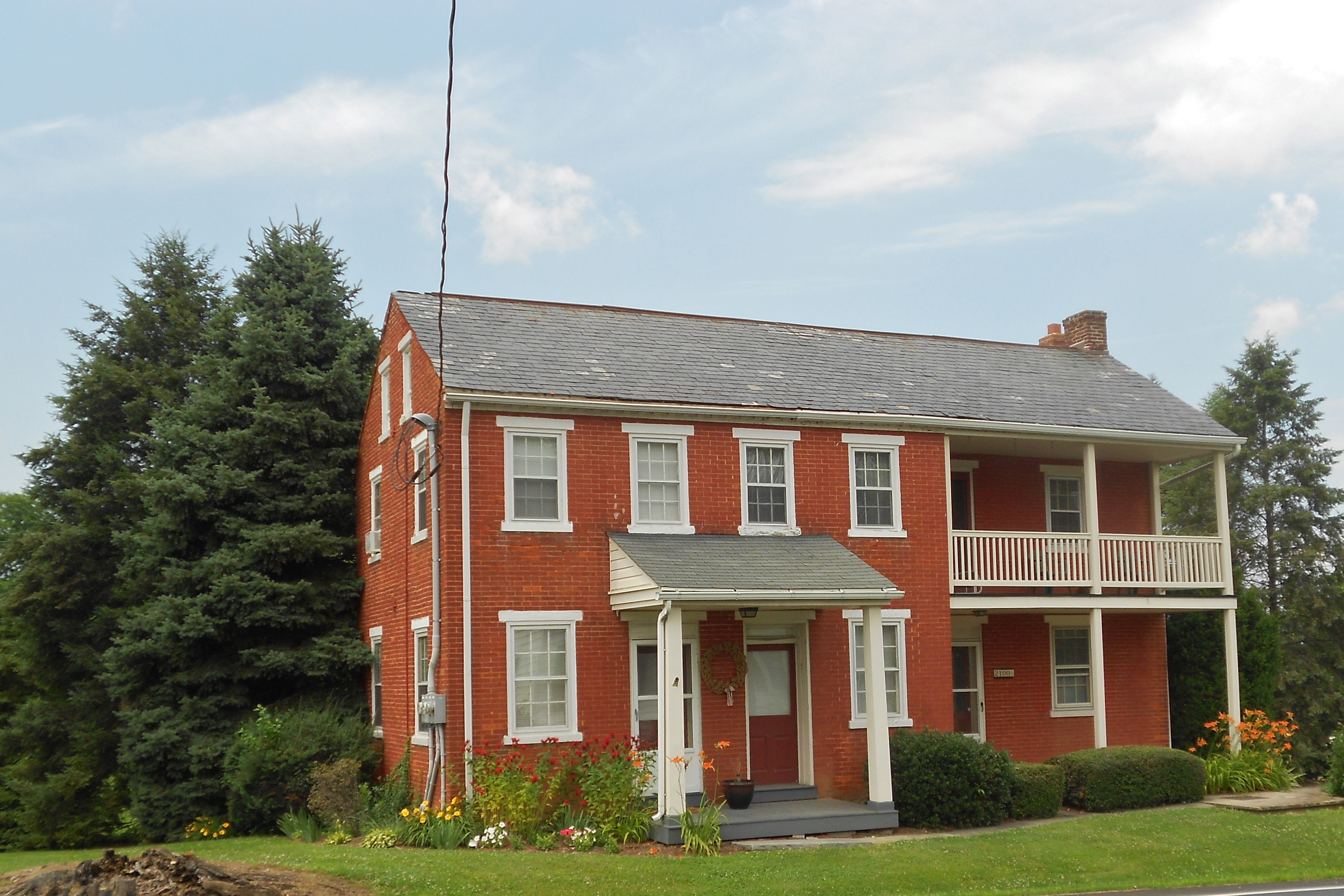
- House in New Danville

- Location in Pennsylvania Location in the United States
- Coordinates: 39°59′11″N 76°18′54″W
- Country: United States
- State: Pennsylvania
- County: Lancaster
- Township: Pequea
- Elevation: 404 ft (123 m)
- Time zone: UTC-5 (Eastern (EST))
  - Summer (DST): UTC-4 (EDT)
- ZIP code: 17603
- Area code: 717
- GNIS feature ID: 1182305

New Danville is an unincorporated community located in Pequea Township in Lancaster County, Pennsylvania, United States.
