= Pequea Township, Pennsylvania =

Township in Pennsylvania, US

Coordinates: 39°58′00″N 76°17′59″W

- Township
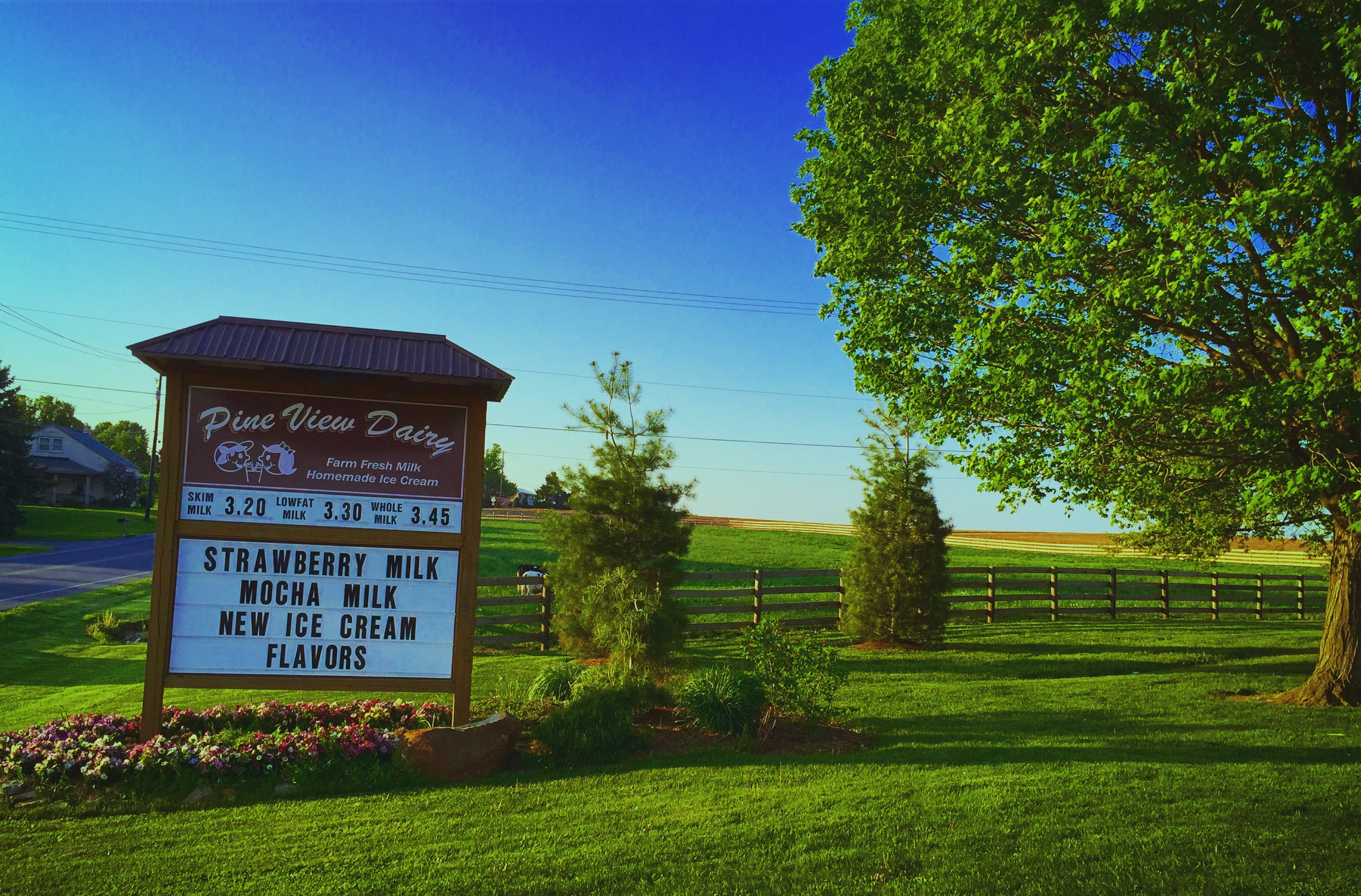
- Dairy in Pequea Township

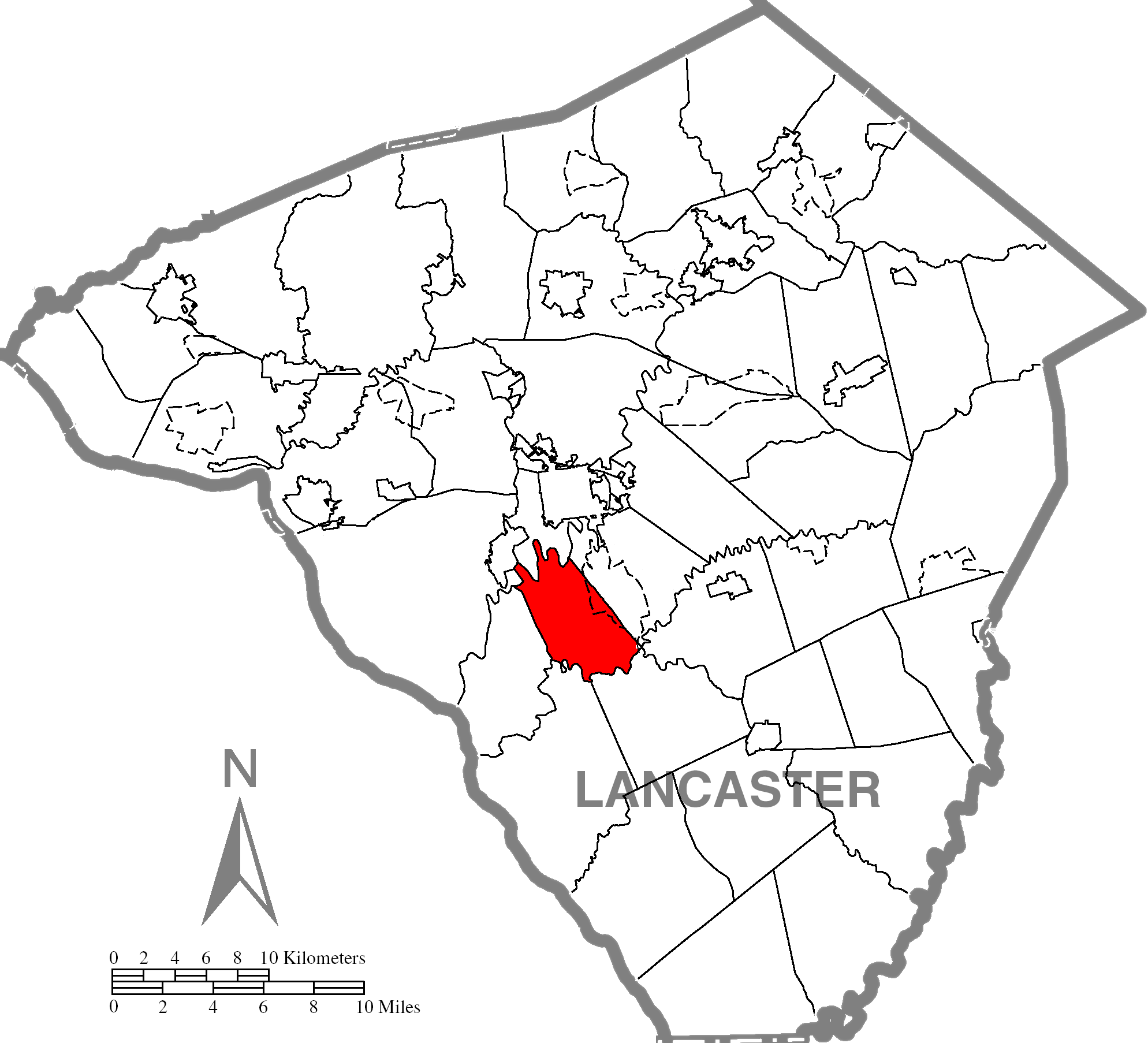
- Map of Lancaster County, Pennsylvania highlighting Pequea Township

- Map of Lancaster County, Pennsylvania
- Country: United States
- State: Pennsylvania
- County: Lancaster
- Incorporated: 1853

Government
  - Type: Board of Supervisors

Area
  - Total: 13.61 sq mi (35.25 km^{2})
  - Land: 13.42 sq mi (34.77 km^{2})
  - Water: 0.19 sq mi (0.48 km^{2})

Population (2020)
  - Total: 5,493 ▲
  - Estimate (2021): 5,619
  - Density: 357.1/sq mi (137.88/km^{2})
- Time zone: UTC-5 (Eastern (EST))
  - Summer (DST): UTC-4 (EDT)
- Area code: 717
- FIPS code: 42-071-59360
- Website: www.pequeatwp.org

Pequea Township (pronounced peck-way) is a township that is located in central Lancaster County, Pennsylvania, United States. The population was 5,493 at the time of the 2020 census.

== History ==
This community was named for the Piqua tribe.

== Geography ==
According to the United States Census Bureau, the township has a total area of 13.6 square miles (35.2 km^{2}), all land. Pequea Creek, a southwestward-flowing tributary of the Susquehanna River, forms the southern border of the township.

Unincorporated communities in Pequea Township include New Danville, West Willow, Baumgardner, Burnt Mills, Herrville, and part of Willow Street.

== Demographics ==
Historical population
Census	Pop.	Note	%±
2000	4,358		—
2010	4,605		5.7%
2020	5,493		19.3%
2021 (est.)	5,619		2.3%
U.S. Decennial Census

At the time of the 2000 census, there were 4,358 people, 1,581 households, and 1,263 families living in the township.

The population density was 320.3 inhabitants per square mile (123.7/km^{2}). There were 1,626 housing units at an average density of 119.5 per square mile (46.1/km^{2}).

The racial makeup of the township was 97.71% White, 0.48% African American, 0.05% Native American, 0.62% Asian, 0.05% Pacific Islander, 0.30% from other races, and 0.80% from two or more races. Hispanic or Latino of any race were 1.03%.

There were 1,581 households, 33.6% had children under the age of eighteen living with them; 71.5% were married couples living together, 5.5% had a female householder with no husband present, and 20.1% were non-families. 16.2% of households were made up of individuals, and 6.3% were one person aged sixty-five or older.

The average household size was 2.75 and the average family size was 3.09.

The age distribution was 26.7% of residents who were under the age of eighteen, 6.6% from who were aged eighteen to twenty-four, 27.1% who were aged twenty-five to forty-four, 27.3% who were aged forty-five to sixty-four, and 12.4% who were aged sixty-five or older. The median age was thirty-nine years.

For every one hundred females, there were 100.2 males. For every one hundred females who were aged eighteen or older, there were 100.1 males.

The median household income was $52,969 and the median family income was $59,010. Males had a median income of $39,423 compared with that of $25,579 for females.

The per capita income for the township was $22,323.

Approximately 3.0% of families and 3.7% of the population were living below the poverty line, including 6.2% of those who were under the age of eighteen and 3.5% of those who were aged sixty-five or older.
