= Pequea Creek =

River in Pennsylvania, United States

Coordinates: 39°53′17″N 76°22′02″W

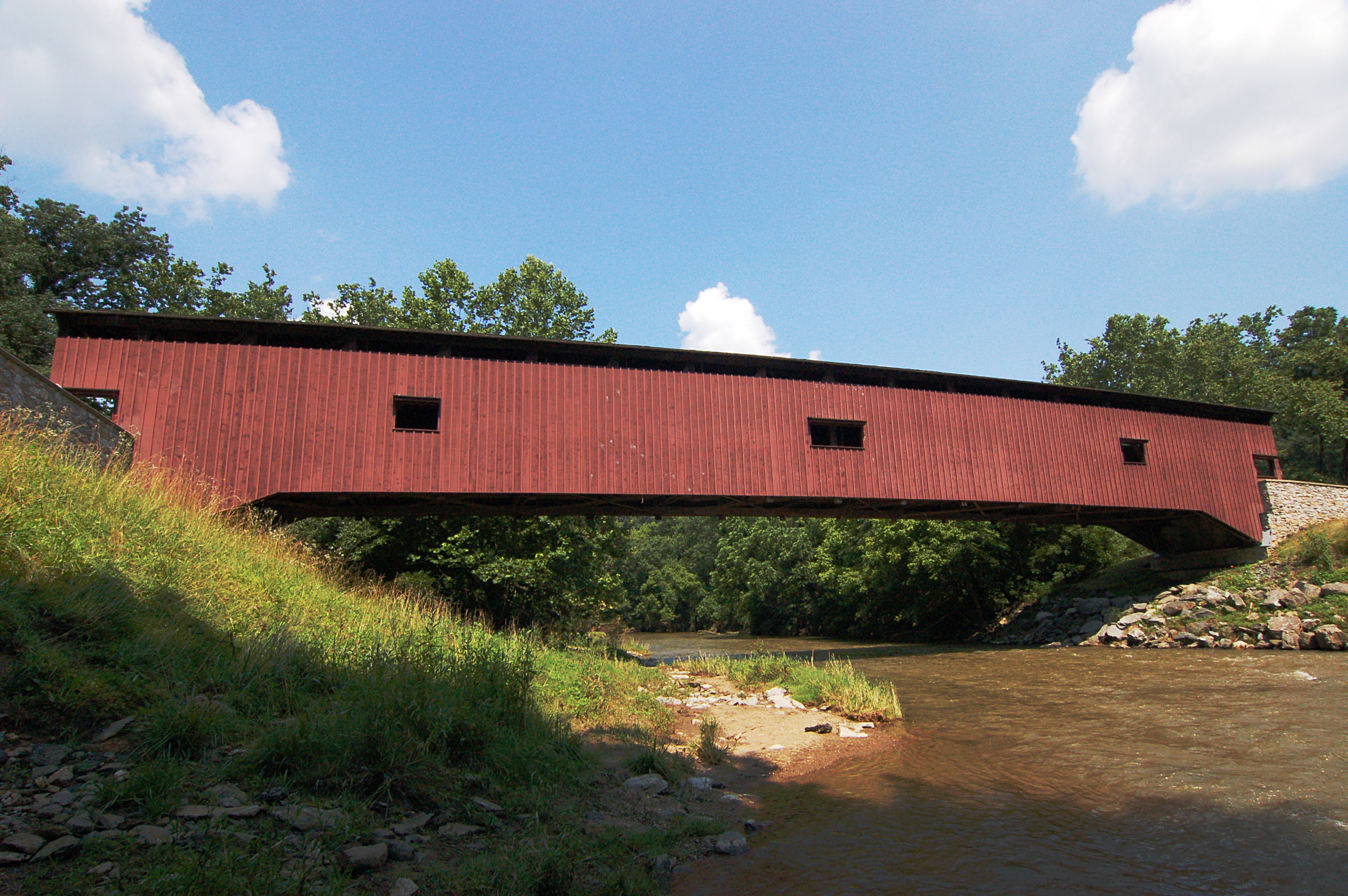
Colemanville Covered Bridge over the Pequea Creek

Pequea Creek (/ˈpɛkweɪ/ PECK-way; Pennsylvania German: Beckweh Grick) is a tributary of the Susquehanna River that runs for 49.2 miles (79.2 km) from the eastern border of Lancaster County and Chester County, Pennsylvania to the village of Pequea, about 5 miles (8 km) above the hydroelectric dam at Holtwood along the Susquehanna River in Lancaster County.

== History and notable features ==
The name of the creek is Shawnee for "dust" or "ashes", referring to a clan that once dwelt at the mouth of the creek.

The stream flows through a pastoral landscape farmed extensively by Pennsylvania German farmers, generally members of Mennonite, Amish, and German-speaking Reformed churches. The Old Order Amish in this watershed were historically called Peckwayers to distinguish them from other Amish who lived along the Conestoga River watershed.

The course of the stream is generally flat, though the last 2.5 miles (4.0 km) flow through a steeper, wooded gorge, rapidly changing from a placid stream to a twisting flume until it reaches the last mile, which is backwater from the Susquehanna.

== See also ==
- List of rivers of Pennsylvania
