= Pennsylvania's 13th Senate district =

American legislative district

Pennsylvania's 13th State Senate district
Senator
Scott Martin; R–Martic Township
- Population (2021): 262,878

Pennsylvania State Senate District 13 includes parts of Berks County and Lancaster County. It is currently represented by Republican Scott Martin.

== District profile ==
The district includes the following areas:

Berks County

- Brecknock Township
- Caernarvon Township
- New Morgan
- Robeson Township

Lancaster County

- Bart Township
- Caernarvon Township
- Christiana
- Colerain Township
- Conestoga Township
- Drumore Township
- East Drumore Township
- East Earl Township
- East Lampeter Township
- Eden Township
- Fulton Township
- Lancaster
- Lancaster Township
- Leacock Township
- Little Britain Township
- Manor Township
- Martic Township
- Millersville
- Paradise Township
- Pequea Township
- Providence Township
- Quarryville
- Sadsbury Township
- Salisbury Township
- Strasburg
- Strasburg Township
- Terre Hill
- Upper Leacock Township
- West Lampeter Township

== Senators ==
Representative	Party	Years	District home	Note	Counties
Isaiah Graham	Republican	1811–1818			Cumberland
Thomas Burnside	Jeffersonian Republican	1811–1814		U.S. Representative for Pennsylvania's 9th district from 1815 to 1816. Associate Justice of the Supreme Court of Pennsylvania from 1845 to 1851	Centre, Clearfield, Lycoming, McKean, Potter, Tioga
Jacob Alter	Democratic-Republican	1817–1820			Cumberland
Thomas Burnside	Jeffersonian Republican	1823–1826		Served as Speaker of the Senate during this second term in the Pennsylvania State Senate for the 13th district	Centre, Clearfield, Lycoming, McKean, Potter
Henry Petrikin	Jackson Democrat	1825–1828		First term in the Pennsylvania State Senate for the 13th district	Centre, Clearfield, Lycoming, McKean, Potter
Robert McClure	Democratic	1827–1830			Centre, Clearfield, Lycoming, McKean, Potter
Joseph Biles Anthony	Republican	1829–1832		U.S. Representative for Pennsylvania's 16th congressional district from 1833 to 1837	Centre, Clearfield, Lycoming, McKean, Potter
Henry Petrikin	Jackson Democrat	1831–1834		Second term in the Pennsylvania State Senate for the 13th district	Centre, Clearfield, Lycoming, McKean, Potter
Alexander Irvin	Democratic	1835–1838		U.S. Representative for Pennsylvania's 24th congressional district from 1847 to 1849	Centre, Clearfield, Lycoming, McKean, Potter
Elihu Case	Whig	1837–1840			Bradford, Susquehanna
Asa Dimock	Democratic	1841–1844			Bradford, Susquehanna
William Sterling Ross	Improvement Democrat	1845–1848			Columbia, Luzerne
Valentine Best	Democratic	1847–1850			Columbia, Luzerne
Samuel Wherry	Democratic	1855–1856			Cumberland, Perry
Charles Rollin Buckalew	Democratic	1857–1858		Pennsylvania State Senator for the 16th district from 1851 to 1854 and 1859 to 1860. U.S. Senator for Pennsylvania from 1863 to 1869. U.S. Representative for Pennsylvania's 11th district from 1887 to 1889 and the 17th district from 1889 to 1891.	Columbia, Montour, Northumberland, Snyder
Henry Fetter	Democratic	1857–1858			Cumberland, Perry
Reuben Keller	Democratic	1859			Columbia, Montour, Northumberland, Snyder
Reuben Keller	Democratic	1860			Montour, Northumberland, Snyder
Franklin Bound	Republican	1861–1862			Montour, Northumberland, Snyder
David B. Montgomery	Democratic	1863–1864			Montour, Northumberland, Snyder
Warren Cowles	Republican	1867–1868			Clinton, McKean, Potter, Tioga
Arthur G. Olmstead	Republican	1869–1870			Clinton, McKean, Potter, Tioga
Albert Gallatin Brodhead	Democratic	1871–1872			Luzerne, Monroe, Pike
Francis Dolan Collins	Democratic	1871–1873		U.S. Representative for Pennsylvania's 11th congressional district from 1875 to 1879	Luzerne, Monroe, Pike
George H. Rowland	Democratic	1873–1875			Luzerne, Monroe, Pike
Amos H. Mylin	Republican	1877–1883			Lancaster (part)
John Herr Landis	Republican	1893–1895			Lancaster (part)
Milton Eby	Republican	1897–1899			Lancaster (part)
Milton Heidelbaugh	Republican	1901–1907			Lancaster (part)
John G. Homsher	Republican	1909–1937			Lancaster (part)
Frederick L. Homsher	Republican	1939–1949			Lancaster (part)
Edward J. Kessler	Republican	1953–1961			Lancaster (part)
Richard A. Snyder	Republican	1962–1964			Lancaster (part)
Richard A. Snyder	Republican	1965–1966			Lancaster
Richard A. Snyder	Republican	1967–1972			Lancaster (part)
Richard A. Snyder	Republican	1973–1982			Chester (part), Lancaster (part)
Richard A. Snyder	Republican	1983–1984			Lancaster (part)
Gibson E. Armstrong	Republican	1985–1992		Pennsylvania State Representative for the 100th district from 1977 to 1984	Lancaster (part)
Gibson E. Armstrong	Republican	1993–2008		Pennsylvania State Representative for the 100th district from 1977 to 1984	Lancaster (part), York (part)
Lloyd K. Smucker	Republican	2009–2012		U.S. Representative for Pennsylvania's 11th congressional district since 2017	Lancaster (part), York (part)
Lloyd K. Smucker	Republican	2013–2016		U.S. Representative for Pennsylvania's 11th congressional district since 2017	Lancaster (part)
Scott Martin	Republican	2017–2022			Lancaster (part)
Scott Martin	Republican	2023–present			Berks (part), Lancaster (part)

== Recent election results ==
PA Senate election, 2020
Party	Candidate	Votes	%
Republican	Scott Martin (incumbent)	73,371	55.6
Democratic	Janet Diaz	58,524	44.4
Total votes		131,895	100.0
Republican hold			

PA Senate election, 2016
Party	Candidate	Votes	%
Republican	Scott Martin	66,595	57.9
Democratic	Gregory Paulson	48,476	42.1
Total votes		115,071	100.0
Republican hold			

PA Senate election, 2012
Party	Candidate	Votes	%
Republican	Lloyd Smucker (incumbent)	64,153	55.7
Democratic	Tom O'Brien	50,981	44.3
Total votes		115,134	100.0
Republican hold			

PA Senate election, 2008
Party	Candidate	Votes	%
Republican	Lloyd Smucker	66,632	56.9
Democratic	Jose Urdaneta	50,488	43.1
Total votes		117,120	100.0
Republican hold			
