= Pennsylvania House of Representatives, District 100 =

American legislative district

Pennsylvania's 100th State House of Representatives district
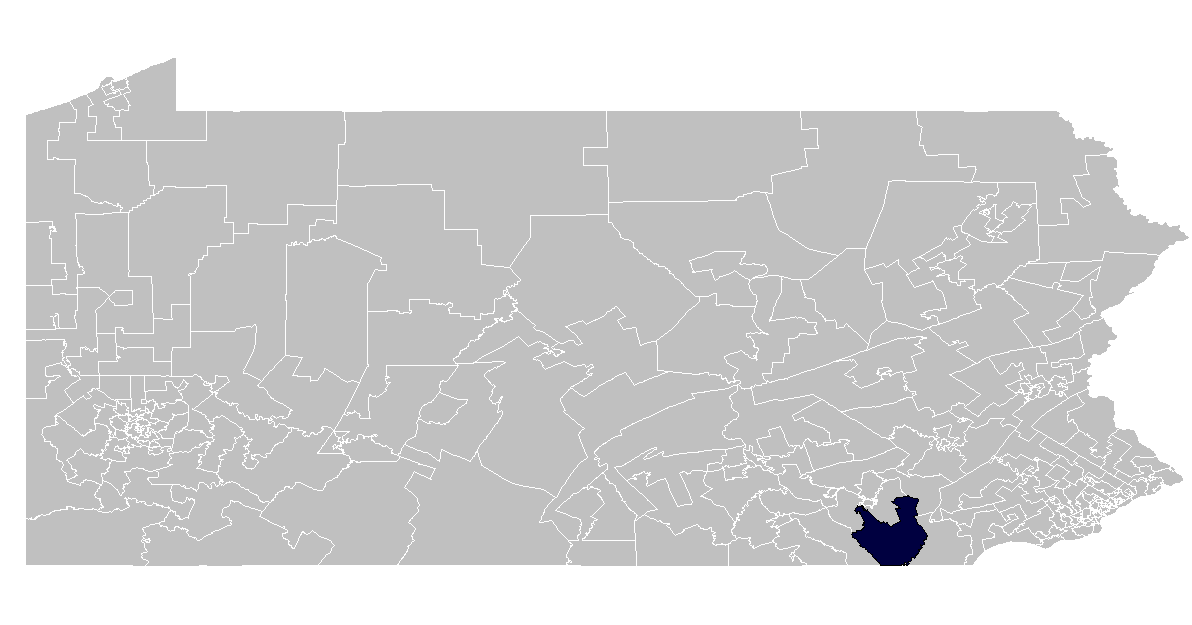
Representative
Bryan Cutler; R–Drumore Township
- Demographics: 94.9% White; 1.9% Black; 3.6% Hispanic
- Population (2011) • Citizens of voting age: 63,248; 46,342

The 100th Pennsylvania House of Representatives District is located in Southeastern Pennsylvania and has been represented since 2007 by Bryan Cutler.

== District profile ==
The 100th Pennsylvania House of Representatives District is located in Lancaster County. It includes Wheatland. It is made up of the following areas:

- Bart Township
- Colerain Township
- Drumore Township
- East Drumore Township
- Eden Township
- Fulton Township

- Little Britain Township
- Martic Township
- Paradise Township
- Pequea Township
- Providence Township

Strasburg Borough Strasburg Township

- Quarryville

Sadsbury Township Salisbury Township, Part, Districts Gap and White Horse

== Representatives ==
Representative	Party	Years	District home	Note
Prior to 1969, seats were apportioned by county.
Sherman L. Hill	Republican	1969 – 1976		
Gibson E. Armstrong	Republican	1977 – 1984	Providence Township	Elected to the Pennsylvania State Senate
John E. Barley	Republican	1985 – 2002	Manor Township	Resigned on April 2, 2002
Gibson C. Armstrong	Republican	2002 – 2006	Strasburg Township	Elected on July 16, 2002 to fill vacancy
Bryan Cutler	Republican	2007 – present	Drumore Township	Incumbent

== Recent election results ==
PA House election, 2024: Pennsylvania House of Representatives, District 100
Party	Candidate	Votes	%
Republican	Bryan Cutler	Unopposed	
Total votes		23,316	97.16
Republican hold			

PA House election, 2022: Pennsylvania House of Representatives, District 100
Party	Candidate	Votes	%
Republican	Bryan Cutler	Unopposed	
Total votes		18,356	100.00
Republican hold			

PA House election, 2020: Pennsylvania House of Representatives, District 100
Party	Candidate	Votes	%
Republican	Bryan Cutler	Unopposed	
Total votes		24,315	100.00
Republican hold			

PA House election, 2018: Pennsylvania House of Representatives, District 100
Party	Candidate	Votes	%
Republican	Bryan Cutler	14,111	72.05
Democratic	Dale Hamby	5,475	27.95
Total votes		19,586	100.00
Republican hold			

PA House election, 2016: Pennsylvania House, District 100
Party	Candidate	Votes	%	±%
Republican	Bryan Cutler	17,416	73.93	
Democratic	Dale Hamby	6,140	26.07	
Margin of victory		11,276	47.86	▼52.14
Turnout		23,556	100	

PA House election, 2014: Pennsylvania House, District 100
Party	Candidate	Votes	%	±%
Republican	Bryan Cutler	11,138	100	
Margin of victory		11,138	100	
Turnout		11,138	100	

PA House election, 2012: Pennsylvania House, District 100
Party	Candidate	Votes	%	±%
Republican	Bryan Cutler	18,795	100	
Margin of victory		18,795	100	
Turnout		18,795	100	

PA House election, 2010: Pennsylvania House, District 100
Party	Candidate	Votes	%	±%
Republican	Bryan Cutler	13,832	100	
Margin of victory		13,832	100	
Turnout		13,832	100	
