= Susquehannock State Park =

State park in Pennsylvania, United States

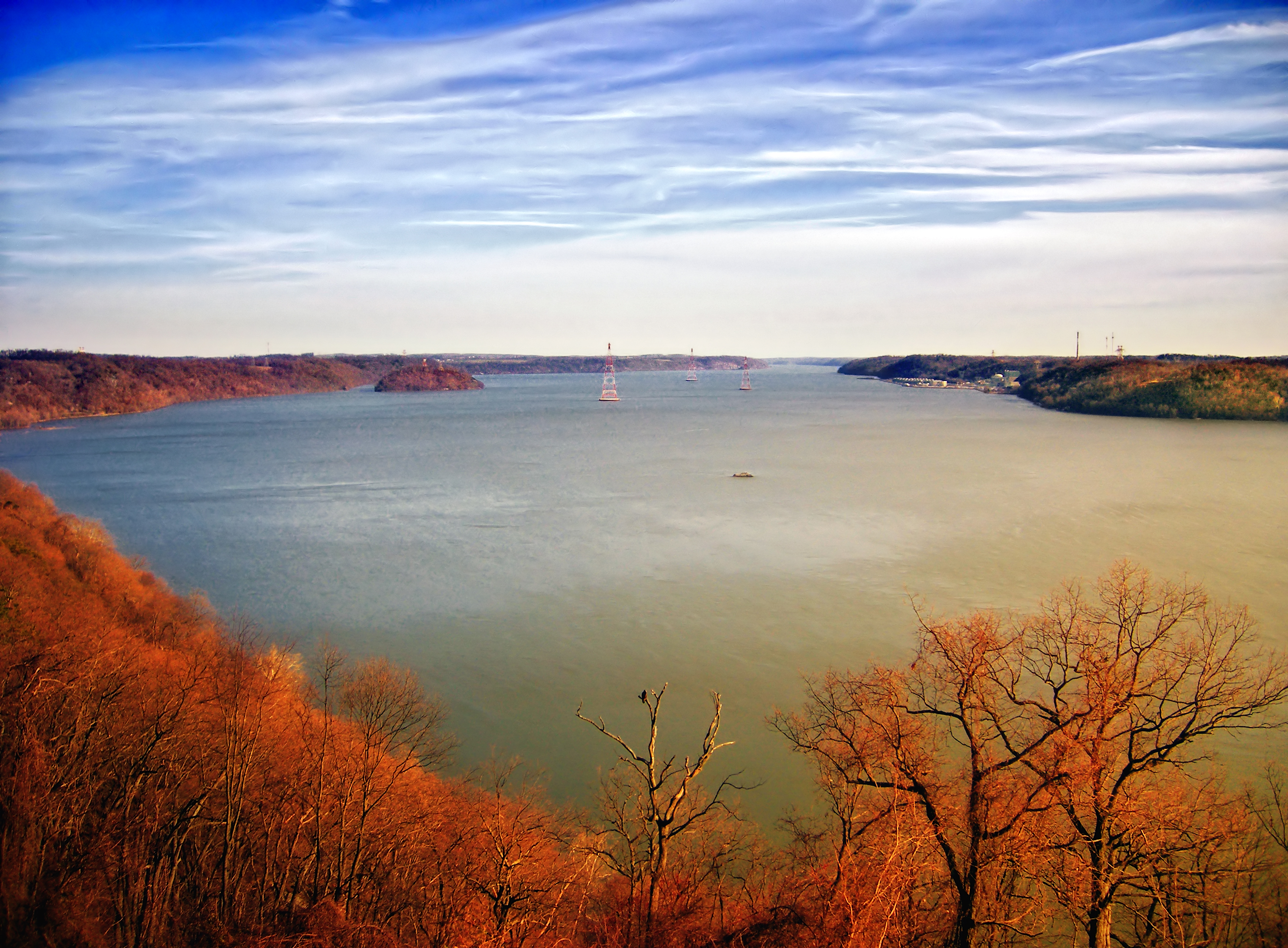

- Location within Pennsylvania Location within the United States
- Interactive map of Susquehannock State Park
- Location: Drumore Township, Lancaster County, Pennsylvania, United States
- Coordinates: 39°48′22″N 76°17′00″W
- Area: 224 acres (91 ha)
- Elevation: 463 feet (141 m)
- Established: 1965
- Administrator: Pennsylvania Department of Conservation and Natural Resources
- Website: Official website
- Pennsylvania State Parks

Susquehannock State Park is a Pennsylvania state park on 224 acres (91 ha) in Drumore Township, Lancaster County, Pennsylvania in the United States. The park is on a scenic plateau overlooking the Susquehanna River and Conowingo Reservoir. The park is named for the Susquehannock people, who lived in the area. Susquehannock State Park is located on small roads a few miles south of Pennsylvania Route 372 and west of Pennsylvania Route 272. The nearest city is Quarryville, Pennsylvania, about 12 miles (19 km) East.

== Recreation ==
In addition to its many fine views of the river and Wissler Run, the park is used for picnics, hiking, horseback riding, and has organized group tenting facilities for overnight use by qualified groups.

=== Hiking trails ===
There are 5 miles (8.0 km) of hiking trails at Susquehannock State Park. The trails wind through a variety of habitats. Native holly, rhododendron and a wide variety of wildflowers can be seen at the park. Woodland creatures like the white-tailed deer, songbirds and some lizards can be seen. Osprey, vultures, hawks and bald eagles can be seen soaring over the river and park from the scenic overlooks. All trails, except Rhododendron Trail, are open to horseback riding.

- Overlook Trail is 0.55 miles (890 m) and leads to the two scenic overlooks at Hawk Point and Wissler's Run.
- Rhododendron Trail is 1.2 miles (1.9 km) and is the steepest and longest trail in the park. The trail passes rhododendrons and the remains of the homestead of Thomas Neel, an American Revolutionary War veteran.
- Pine Tree Trail is a short and steep access trail to Wissler's Run.
- Five Point Trail is 0.7 miles (1.1 km) and features views of creek valleys and many rhododendrons.
- Holly Trail is 0.5 miles (800 m) and passes by native holly bushes and Christmas ferns.
- Fire Trail is a short logging road through a stand of poplar trees.
- Spring Trail is 0.4 miles (640 m) and features pawpaw trees.
- Nature Trail passes through a mature hardwood forest for 0.3 miles (480 m).
- Phites Eddy Trail is a short trail that runs along the river in the vicinity of a former inn.
- Landis Trail is 0.6 miles (970 m) and is named for Lester Landis the original owner of the historical Landis House which is across from the park office. A stand of Virginia bluebells bloom along this trail in late April and early May.
- Pipeline Trail is 0.24 miles (390 m) and follows the right of way of an abandoned pipeline.

=== Scenic overlooks ===
Susquehannock State Park features two scenic overlooks. They offer a view of the Susquehanna River and the Conowingo Reservoir on the Susquehanna River. Hawk Point overlooks the reservoir, a hydroelectric impoundment created by Conowingo Dam in northern Maryland. The waters of the reservoir provide hydroelectric power and cooling water for the Peach Bottom nuclear reactor. The reservoir is also a recreational center for boating and fishing. The waters also provide a habitat for a wide variety of fish. These fish are preyed upon by bald eagles and osprey. Hawks, turkey vultures and black vultures can also be seen soaring over the park from Hawk Point. Down the hill from Hawk Point overlook is Wissler's Run overlook. This vista gives a view of the original rocky nature of the Susquehanna's riverbed.

== The Susquehannock Tribe ==
The Susquehannocks, an Iroquoian speaking tribe, had their first encounter with Europeans in 1608 when Captain John Smith was exploring the Chesapeake Bay for the English Crown. What the Susquehannock called themselves is unknown, the modern name comes from the name, Sasquesahanough or "roily water people", bestowed upon them by Cpt. Smith and his Algonquian interpreter. They made their home by the river and had only one small village (Conestoga), but they were a strong tribe, that controlled trade routes along the river and the upper reaches of the bay. The Susquehannock lived along the river until 1675 when they suffered a major defeat at the hands of the Iroquois. Following this loss they began a period of migration and eventual decline. Five chiefs were murdered in Maryland when they went to a meeting to negotiate a treaty. They migrated to New York in 1677 and intermingled with the Iroquois. They returned to Conestoga in 1697 but left again in the early 18th century when they migrated, again, to Ohio. Some remained behind and became known as Conestogas. They were able to live in Pennsylvania until 1763 when a group of six were slaughtered by the anti-Indian Paxton Boys. The remaining members of the tribe sought protection from the colonial governor and were taken to a workhouse in Lancaster. The Paxton Boys gained entry to the workhouse and murdered fourteen more Indians. Only two Susquehannocks remained in Pennsylvania. They worked the rest of their lives as servants on a farm where they died and were buried bringing about the end of the Susquehannock people in Pennsylvania.
