= Richard Snyder =

Richard Snyder may refer to:

- Rick Snyder (born 1958), American business executive and former governor of Michigan
- Rich Snyder (businessman) (1952–1993), American business executive, president of In-N-Out Burger
- Richard C. Snyder (1916–1997), American political scientist
- Richard A. Snyder (1910–1978), Republican member of the Pennsylvania State Senate
- Richard E. Snyder (1933-2023), American publishing executive
- Richard Edward Snyder (1919–2012), US State Dept official
- Richard P. Snyder (born 1960), United States Navy admiral
- Richard T. Snyder, namesake of the USCGC Richard Snyder
- Dick Snyder (born 1944), American former basketball player
- Charles R. Snyder (1944–2006), known as Rick, American psychologist
- USCGC Richard Snyder, a Coast Guard cutter
