= Sherman Hill =

Sherman Hill may refer to:

- Sherman L. Hill (1911–1984), American politician
- Sherman Hill Historic District, Des Moines, Iowa, US
- Sherman Hill Summit, a mountain pass near Sherman, Wyoming, US
