= New Providence, Pennsylvania =

Unincorporated community in Pennsylvania, US

- Unincorporated community
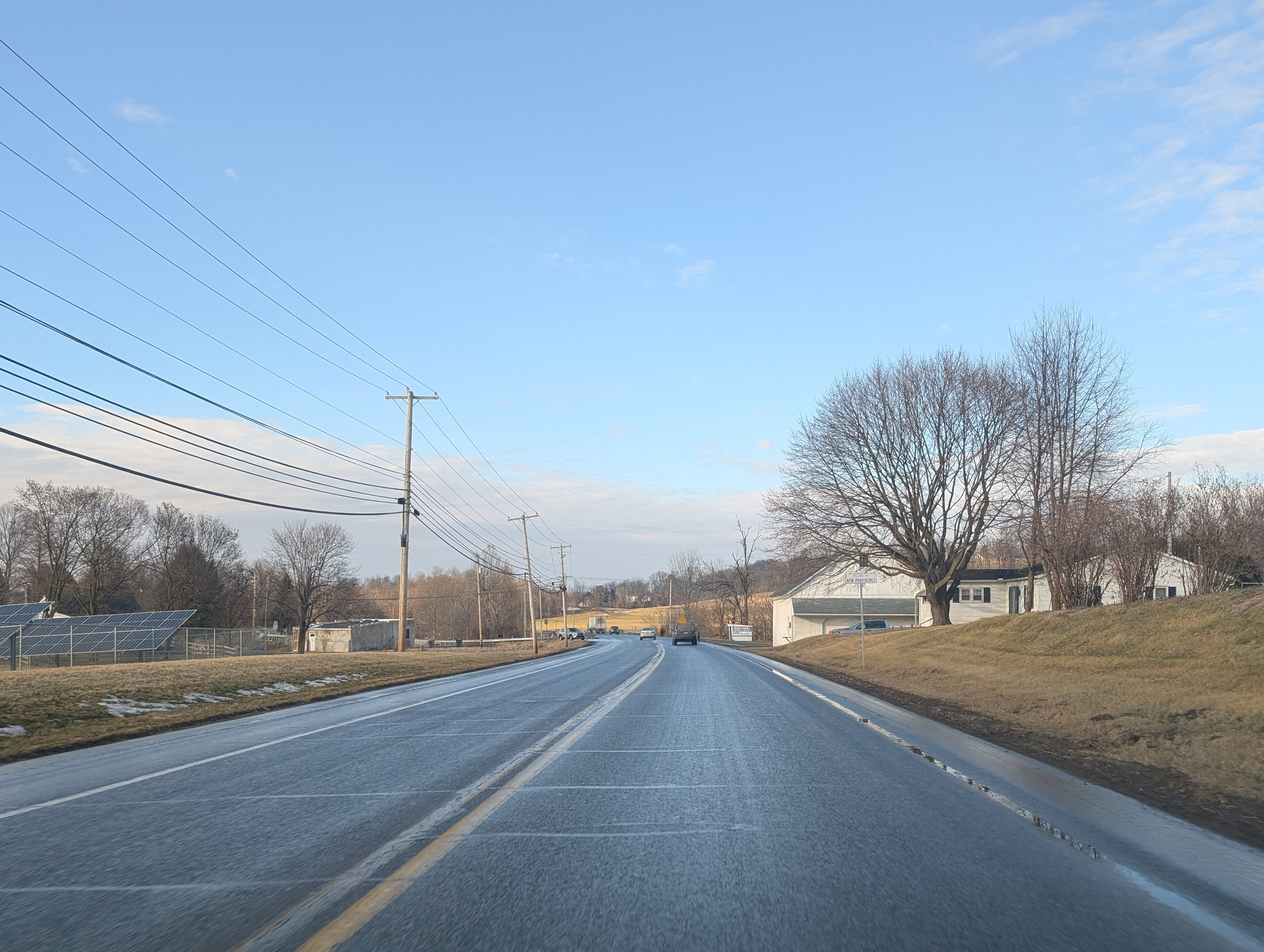
- US 222 northbound entering New Providence

- Location within Pennsylvania Location within the United States
- Coordinates: 39°55′31″N 76°11′53″W
- Country: United States
- State: Pennsylvania
- County: Lancaster
- Township: Providence
- Elevation: 384 ft (117 m)

Population (2010)
  - Total: 102
- Time zone: UTC-5 (Eastern (EST))
  - Summer (DST): UTC-4 (EDT)
- ZIP code: 17560
- Area code: 717
- GNIS feature ID: 1182358

New Providence is an unincorporated community and village in Providence Township of Lancaster County, Pennsylvania, United States. It is at the intersection of Main Street and Pennsy Road, southwest of the Big Beaver Creek and U.S. Route 222 and northwest of Quarryville.
