= Bryan Cutler =

American politician (born 1975)

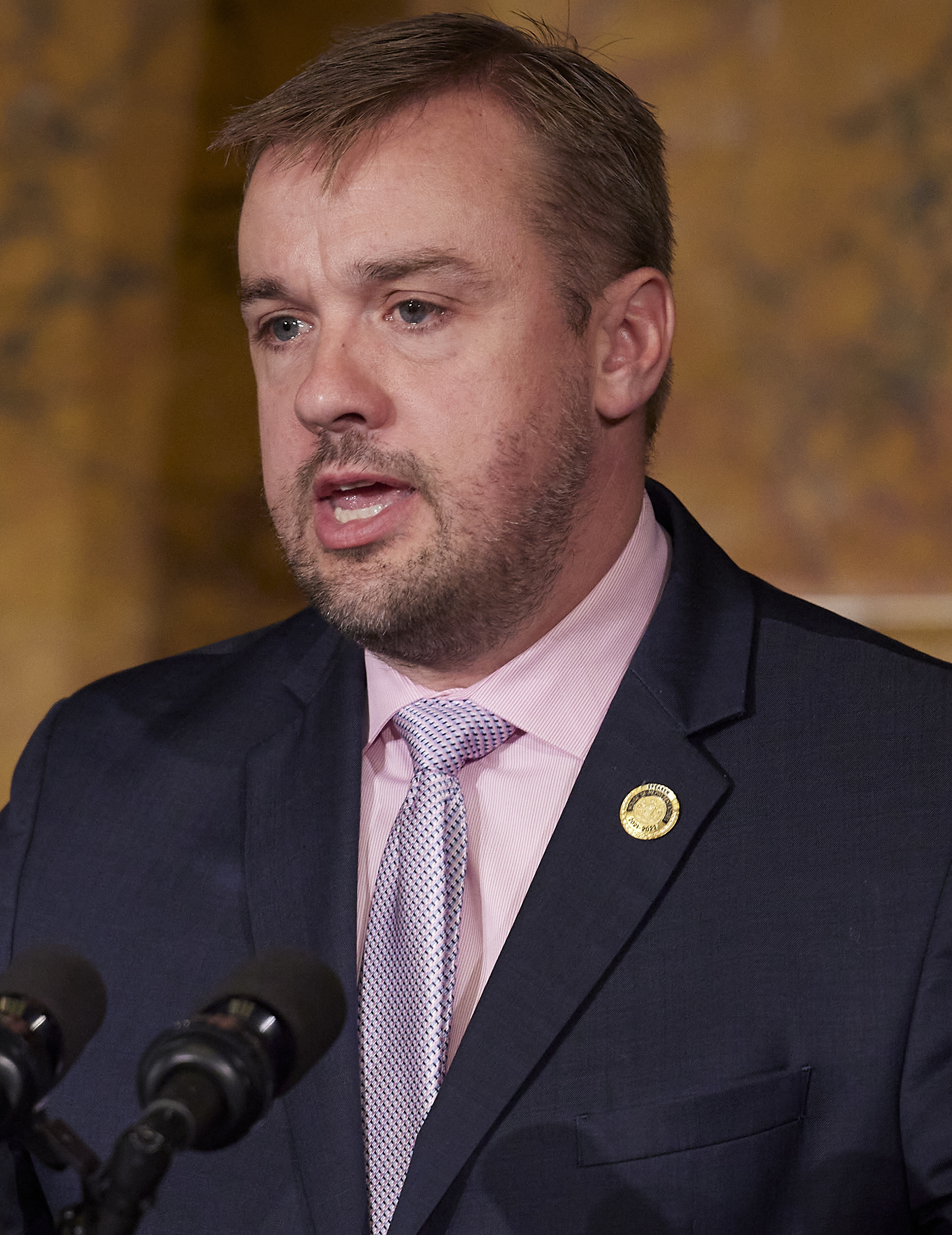

Minority Leader of the Pennsylvania House of Representatives
- In office February 8, 2023 – January 7, 2025
- Preceded by: Joanna McClinton
- Succeeded by: Jesse Topper

141st Speaker of the Pennsylvania House of Representatives
- In office June 22, 2020 – January 3, 2023
- Preceded by: Mike Turzai
- Succeeded by: Mark Rozzi

Majority Leader of the Pennsylvania House of Representatives
- In office December 1, 2022 – February 8, 2023
- Preceded by: Kerry A. Benninghoff
- Succeeded by: Joanna McClinton
- In office December 1, 2018 – June 22, 2020
- Preceded by: Dave L. Reed
- Succeeded by: Kerry A. Benninghoff

Member of the Pennsylvania House of Representatives from the 100th district
- Incumbent
- Assumed office January 2, 2007
- Preceded by: Gibson C. Armstrong

Personal details
- Born: Bryan Dean Cutler; 1975 (age 50–51) Lancaster County, Pennsylvania, U.S.
- Party: Republican
- Spouse: Jennifer Cutler
- Children: 3
- Education: Lebanon Valley College (BS); Widener University (JD)
- Website: State House website

Bryan Dean Cutler (born 1975) is an American politician and former Speaker of the Pennsylvania House of Representatives. A Republican, Cutler represents the 100th legislative district of the Pennsylvania House of Representatives. He was first elected in 2006, defeating incumbent Gibson C. Armstrong. He was elected House Majority Leader after the 2018 elections, and he became Speaker on June 22, 2020, after the resignation of Mike Turzai. Cutler remained speaker until Republicans lost the 2022 election and later stepped down from leadership after a similar defeat in 2024. He announced his retirement from the state House in 2025.

== Early life and career ==
Cutler was born in 1975 in Lancaster County, Pennsylvania, the son of Joyce and Gary Cutler. He graduated from Solanco High School in 1993. Cutler earned certification from Lancaster School of Radiology in 1995 and received a bachelor of science degree from Lebanon Valley College in 2001. In 2006, he earned a juris doctor degree from Widener University School of Law. Cutler also has a certificate in health care from Widener. He worked as an X-ray technologist at Lancaster Regional Medical Center and as a Manager of Support Services at Lancaster General Hospital.

Cutler served on the Drumore Township Planning Commission.

== Pennsylvania House of Representatives ==
Cutler was first elected to the Pennsylvania House of Representatives in 2006 after challenging incumbent Representative Gibson C. Armstrong in the Republican primary election. His victory came after Armstrong filed to accept perks from the controversial 2005 legislative pay raise, despite voting against it. Cutler was re-elected continuously thereafter. Ahead of the 2026 election, Cutler announced his retirement in 2025.

In 2014, Cutler drafted a bill that would have removed the state's role in deducting dues from the paychecks of municipal and teacher union members. He cited the 10 percent of union dues used for political ads and lobbying as the primary reason for removing state involvement. The bill was never voted on by the House. Cutler later voted in favor of a similar, but unsuccessful bill in 2017.

In 2015, Cutler voiced concerns about the potential economic impact of Governor Tom Wolf's proposed severance tax on gas drilling, stating, “If we’re gonna stunt the economic growth and future impact I think we have to consider that.”

Later in 2015, following terror attacks in Paris, Cutler voiced concerns about terrorists potentially entering Pennsylvania alongside Syrian refugees and signed onto a letter encouraging Governor Wolf to reverse his decision to allow refugees into the state.

In 2016, Cutler co-sponsored a memorandum in support of House Bill 1948, which was put forth by Representative Kathy Rapp. The bill's purpose was to make it so that abortions in Pennsylvania would only be permitted during the first 20 weeks of pregnancy because of a fetus's ability to feel pain after the time parameter, violating the measure would be considered a third-degree felony. Cutler, along with Rapp and Representative Bryan Barbin, wrote in the memorandum that the bill would also put a stop to dismemberment being used as an abortion method.

Cutler has opposed legalizing recreational marijuana in Pennsylvania. He has cited potential complications in criminal and financial statutes, marijuana's illegal federal status, and the opioid epidemic.

Following the 2020 presidential election, Cutler was subject to a pressure campaign by President Donald Trump and his allies to help overturn Trump's defeat in Pennsylvania. Cutler resisted these efforts, stating that the state legislature did not have the power to decertify election results, but he would later sign on to a letter urging members of the U.S. Congress to vote against certifying the election. His resistance to overturning the election results resulted in Cutler facing a right-wing primary challenger in 2022 and 2024, both of whom he soundly defeated. The challengers specifically attacked Cutler's support for Act 77 of 2019, the law that established no-excuse mail-in voting, something Trump falsely claimed enabled mass voter fraud; Cutler has defended his vote for Act 77, but contends it was "hijacked" away from its original purpose by the courts.

Also at issue in his 2024 reelection was Cutler's support for Mark Rozzi as speaker of the house following the 2022 election. Democrats won the election, but three vacancies denied the party an actual majority. To avoid a protracted dispute over control of the state house, Cutler and 13 other Republicans voted with all Democrats to elect Rozzi, a Democrat, as speaker. The deal struct between Republican and Democratic leaders was supposed to see Rozzi change his affiliation to independent. However, Rozzi never changed his affiliation and resigned once special elections were held and gave Democrats full control of the state house.

=== Leadership positions ===
Cutler was first elected by the Republican Caucus as majority whip in 2014. In 2018, Cutler was chosen as majority leader following the retirement of Leader Dave Reed. Sixteen months after assuming the role of majority leader, Cutler was voted in as Speaker of the Pennsylvania House of Representatives after Mike Turzai resigned as Speaker on June 15, 2020. After Republicans lost their majority in the 2022 election, Cutler declined to be the party's nominee for speaker and returned to the leader position. When Republicans failed to reclaim the House majority in the 2024 election, Cutler announced he would step down as leader.

== Electoral history ==
2006 Pennsylvania House of Representatives Republican primary election, District 100
| Party | Candidate | Votes | % |
|---|---|---|---|
| Republican | Bryan Cutler | 3,776 | 58.41 |
| Republican | Gibson C. Armstrong (incumbent) | 2,685 | 41.53 |
| Write-in | | 4 | 0.07 |
| Total votes | | 6,465 | 100.00 |

2006 Pennsylvania House of Representatives election, District 100
| Party | Candidate | Votes | % |
|---|---|---|---|
| Republican | Bryan Cutler | 12,606 | 98.42 |
| Write-in | | 203 | 1.58 |
| Total votes | | 12,809 | 100.00 |

2008 Pennsylvania House of Representatives election, District 100
| Party | Candidate | Votes | % |
|---|---|---|---|
| Republican | Bryan Cutler (incumbent) | 19,123 | 99.32 |
| Write-in | | 131 | 0.68 |
| Total votes | | 19,254 | 100.00 |

2010 Pennsylvania House of Representatives election, District 100
| Party | Candidate | Votes | % |
|---|---|---|---|
| Republican | Bryan Cutler (incumbent) | 13,832 | 99.13 |
| Write-in | | 122 | 0.87 |
| Total votes | | 13,954 | 100.00 |

2012 Pennsylvania House of Representatives election, District 100
| Party | Candidate | Votes | % |
|---|---|---|---|
| Republican | Bryan Cutler (incumbent) | 18,795 | 98.92 |
| Write-in | | 206 | 1.08 |
| Total votes | | 19,001 | 100.00 |

2014 Pennsylvania House of Representatives election, District 100
| Party | Candidate | Votes | % |
|---|---|---|---|
| Republican | Bryan Cutler (incumbent) | 11,138 | 98.54 |
| Write-in | | 165 | 1.46 |
| Total votes | | 11,303 | 100.00 |

2016 Pennsylvania House of Representatives election, District 100
| Party | Candidate | Votes | % |
|---|---|---|---|
| Republican | Bryan Cutler (incumbent) | 17,416 | 73.85 |
| Democratic | Dale Hamby | 6,140 | 26.03 |
| Write-in | | 28 | 0.12 |
| Total votes | | 23,584 | 100.00 |

2018 Pennsylvania House of Representatives election, District 100
| Party | Candidate | Votes | % |
|---|---|---|---|
| Republican | Bryan Cutler (incumbent) | 14,111 | 71.98 |
| Democratic | Dale Hamby | 5,475 | 27.93 |
| Write-in | | 19 | 0.10 |
| Total votes | | 19,605 | 100.00 |

2020 Pennsylvania House of Representatives election, District 100
| Party | Candidate | Votes | % |
|---|---|---|---|
| Republican | Bryan Cutler (incumbent) | 24,254 | 97.28 |
| Write-in | | 677 | 2.72 |
| Total votes | | 24,931 | 100.00 |

2022 Pennsylvania House of Representatives Republican primary election, District 100
| Party | Candidate | Votes | % |
|---|---|---|---|
| Republican | Bryan Cutler (incumbent) | 6,161 | 70.19 |
| Republican | Anne Weston | 2,608 | 29.71 |
| Write-in | | 8 | 0.09 |
| Total votes | | 8,777 | 100.00 |

2022 Pennsylvania House of Representatives election, District 100
| Party | Candidate | Votes | % |
|---|---|---|---|
| Republican | Bryan Cutler (incumbent) | 18,356 | 97.68 |
| Write-in | | 436 | 2.32 |
| Total votes | | 18,792 | 100.00 |

2024 Pennsylvania House of Representatives Republican primary election, District 100
| Party | Candidate | Votes | % |
|---|---|---|---|
| Republican | Bryan Cutler (incumbent) | 5,029 | 53.51 |
| Republican | Dave Nissley | 4,362 | 46.41 |
| Write-in | | 7 | 0.07 |
| Total votes | | 9,398 | 100.00 |

2024 Pennsylvania House of Representatives election, District 100
| Party | Candidate | Votes | % |
|---|---|---|---|
| Republican | Bryan Cutler (incumbent) | 23,316 | 97.16 |
| Write-in | | 682 | 2.84 |
| Total votes | | 23,998 | 100.00 |

Pennsylvania House of Representatives
| Preceded by Dave L. Reed | Majority Leader of the Pennsylvania House of Representatives; 2018–2020 | Succeeded by Kerry Benninghoff |
| Preceded by Kerry Benninghoff | Majority Leader of the Pennsylvania House of Representatives; 2022–2023 | Succeeded by Joanna McClinton |
| Preceded by Joanna McClinton | Minority Leader of the Pennsylvania House of Representatives; 2023–2025 | Succeeded by Jesse Topper |
Political offices
| Preceded by Mike Turzai | Speaker of the Pennsylvania House of Representatives; 2020–2023 | Succeeded by Mark Rozzi |
