= Big Beaver Creek =

Creek in Lancaster County, Pennsylvania, United States

Coordinates: 39°56′52″N 76°15′07″W

Big Beaver Creek is a 9.7-mile-long (15.6 km) tributary of the Pequea Creek in western Lancaster County, Pennsylvania in the United States.

The tributary South Fork meets near New Providence to form the main stem of Big Beaver Creek.

Big Beaver Creek enters the Pequea at the village of Herrville.

== See also ==
- List of Pennsylvania rivers
