= Drumore, Pennsylvania =

Unincorporated community in Pennsylvania, US

- Unincorporated community
- Location within Pennsylvania
- Coordinates: 39°47′30″N 76°15′54″W
- Country: United States
- State: Pennsylvania
- County: Lancaster
- Township: Drumore
- Elevation: 118 ft (36 m)
- Time zone: UTC-5 (Eastern (EST))
  - Summer (DST): UTC-4 (EDT)
- ZIP code: 17518
- Area code: 717
- GNIS feature ID: 1203449

Drumore is an unincorporated community in Drumore Township in Lancaster County, Pennsylvania, United States. Drumore is located at the intersection of Port Deposit Road and Fishing Creek Road, along the east bank of the Susquehanna River at the mouth of Fishing Creek.

The Drumore ZIP code 17518 covers 14.15 sq mi (36.6 km^{2}), a population of 1,355 and 456 housing units, 420 of those occupied.
