= Solanco School District =

Rural public school district in the southern Lancaster County, Pennsylvania

Coordinates: 39.838°N 76.131°W

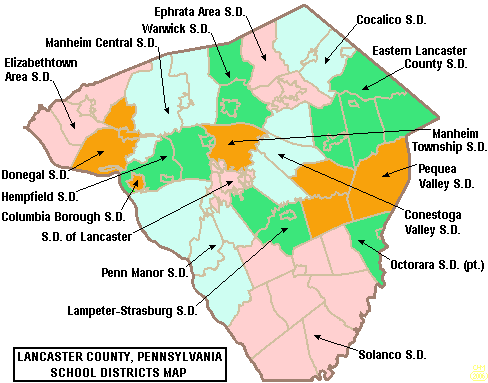

Address
- 121 S Hess Street Quarryville, Lancaster County, Pennsylvania, 17566-1225; United States

District information
- Grades: K-12th

Students and staff
- District mascot: Golden Mule
- Colors: Black, gold

Other information
- Website: solancosd.org

Solanco School District is a large, rural public school district located in the southern end of Lancaster County (SoLanCo - Southern Lancaster County), Pennsylvania, United States. Solanco School District encompasses approximately 180 square miles (470 km^{2}). Solanco School District serves: Providence Township, Eden Township, Quarryville Borough, Little Britain Township, Bart Township, Colerain Township, Drumore Township, East Drumore Township and Fulton Township. According to 2008 local census data, it served a resident population of 30,566. By 2010, the district's had population increased to 31,871.

In 2009, the district residents' per capita income was $17,040, while the median family income was $49,432. In the Commonwealth, the median family income was $49,501 and the United States median family income was $49,445 in 2010.

The district operates seven schools: four elementary, two middle/junior high, one high school and a virtual academy (K-12).

- Elementary schools:
  - Quarryville Elementary School
  - Providence Elementary School
  - Bart-Colerain Elementary School
  - Clermont Elementary School
- Middle schools:
  - George A. Smith Middle School
  - Swift Middle School
- High school:
  - Solanco High School

== Extracurriculars ==
Solanco School District offers a variety of clubs and activities, and an extensive sports program.

=== Sports ===
The district funds:

Boys

- Baseball - AAAA
- Basketball- AAAA
- Cross country - AAA
- Football - AAA
- Golf - AAAA
- Indoor track and field - AAAA
- Soccer - AAA
- Track and field - AAA
- Wrestling - AAA

Girls

- Basketball - AAAA
- Cross country - AAA
- Indoor track and field - AAAA
- Field hockey - AAA
- Soccer (fall) - AAA
- Softball - AAAA
- Tennis - AAA
- Track and field - AAA
- Volleyball - AAA

Junior high school sports

Boys

- Basketball
- Cross country
- Football
- Soccer
- Track and field
- Wrestling

Girls

- Basketball
- Cross country
- Field hockey
- Soccer (fall)
- Track and field
- Volleyball

According to PIAA directory July 2012
