= Lloyd Smucker =

American politician (born 1964)

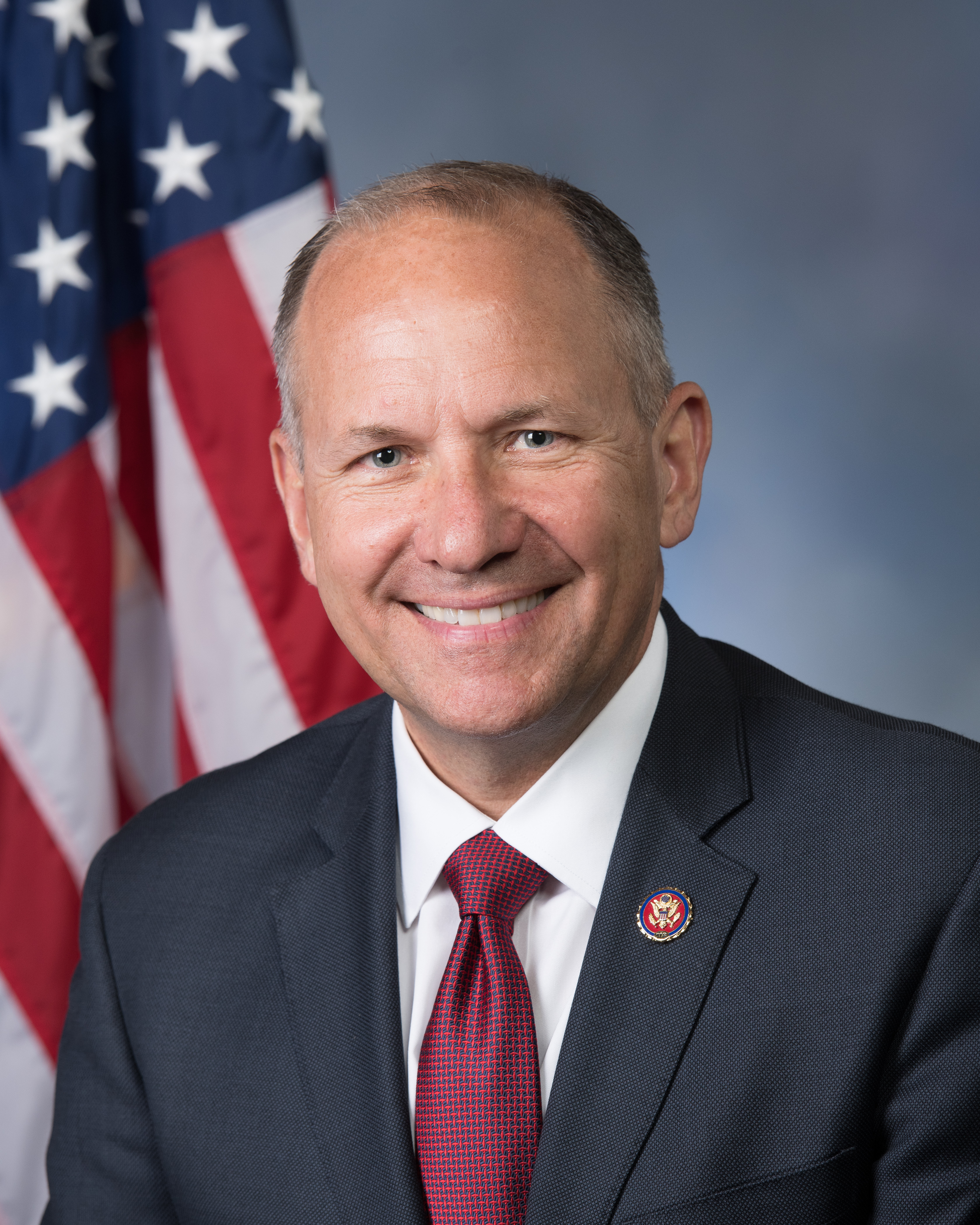
- Official portrait, 2019

Member of the U.S. House of Representatives from Pennsylvania
- Incumbent
- Assumed office January 3, 2017
- Preceded by: Joe Pitts
- Constituency: 16th district (2017–2019); 11th district (2019–present)

Member of the Pennsylvania Senate from the 13th district
- In office January 6, 2009 – November 30, 2016
- Preceded by: Gib Armstrong
- Succeeded by: Scott Martin

Personal details
- Born: Lloyd Kenneth Smucker; January 23, 1964 (age 62) Lancaster County, Pennsylvania, U.S.
- Party: Republican
- Spouse: Cindy
- Children: 3
- Education: Lebanon Valley College (attended); Franklin and Marshall College (attended)
- Website: House website Campaign website

Lloyd Kenneth Smucker (born January 23, 1964) is an American politician serving as the U.S. representative from Pennsylvania's 11th congressional district, which includes Lancaster County and most of southern York County. He is a member of the Republican Party and represented the 16th district until the Supreme Court of Pennsylvania redrew it in 2018. He was a member of the Pennsylvania State Senate for the 13th district from 2009 to 2016.

== Biography ==
Smucker was born in Lancaster County, Pennsylvania, to Daniel and Arie Smucker. At the time of his birth, the family belonged to the Old Order Amish, but they left the community when he was five years old. After graduating from Lancaster Mennonite High School in 1981, he attended Lebanon Valley College and Franklin & Marshall College, where he earned credits in liberal arts but did not complete a degree. For 25 years, he served as president of the Smucker Company, a family-owned commercial construction firm in Smoketown. Smucker is a Lutheran and has three children with his wife, Cindy.

== Pennsylvania Senate ==
Smucker was a member of the West Lampeter Township Planning Commission for four years before serving two terms as a township supervisor. In 2008, after 23-year incumbent Gib Armstrong decided to retire, Smucker entered the four-way Republican primary to succeed him, receiving 47% of the vote. In the general election, he defeated the Democratic nominee, Lancaster City Council member José E. Urdaneta, 57%-43%.

== U.S. House of Representatives ==
=== Elections ===
On November 8, 2016, Smucker defeated Christina Hartman with 53% of the vote in the race to replace the retiring Joe Pitts in Congress. He was sworn in to represent Pennsylvania's 16th congressional district on January 3, 2017.

A new congressional map imposed by the Pennsylvania Supreme Court renumbered Smucker's district as the 11th district. It picked up the sliver of Lancaster County that had previously been in the 7th district, while losing its shares of Chester and Berks counties. To make up for the loss in population, it was shifted to the west, absorbing most of the more rural eastern portion of York County. The old 16th had been one of Pennsylvania's most Republican districts, but the Democratic trend in areas of the district closer to Philadelphia had resulted in close races at the presidential level since the turn of the millennium. John McCain only carried the old 16th with 51% of the vote in 2008, while Mitt Romney won it with 52% in 2012 and Donald Trump won it with 51% in 2016. According to Nate Cohn of The New York Times, these trends theoretically left Smucker vulnerable in a Democratic wave.

In contrast, the new 11th is significantly more rural and Republican than its predecessor. Had it existed in 2016, Trump would have won it with over 60% of the vote, which would have been his fifth-best showing in the state. According to Cohn, the Republican-controlled state legislature had placed the more Democratic areas of Chester and Berks counties into the 16th in order to protect Republican incumbents in neighboring districts. As Cohn put it, the loss of those areas and the addition of part of York County had the effect of making what was already a "naturally Republican" district even more so.

As expected, Smucker won a second term handily, defeating Democratic nominee Jess King with 59% of the vote.

=== Tenure ===
During the presidency of Donald Trump, Smucker voted in line with Trump's stated position 94% of the time. As of September 2021, Smucker had voted in line with Joe Biden's stated position 14.3% of the time.

Smucker supported the American Health Care Act, the GOP's legislation to repeal and replace the Affordable Care Act (Obamacare).

On September 24, 2014, Smucker voted against Pennsylvania senate bill SB1182, which would legalize medical cannabis in Pennsylvania. He voted to repeal provisions in the Dodd-Frank Wall Street Reform and Consumer Protection Act. He has voted for increases in military spending. He supported legislation to punish sanctuary cities. In 2017, Smucker voted for a budget that proposed cutting Medicare by $537 billion and giving seniors the opportunity to enroll in private plans in competition with Medicare.

On January 6, 2021, Smucker voted to overturn the Electoral College results that would make Biden president. Pennsylvania cast its electoral ballots for Biden in the 2020 presidential election.

=== Political positions ===
==== Abortion ====
Smucker opposes abortion. He supports including fetuses among those given civil rights protections per the 14th amendment and introduced a bill to protect "infant survivors of abortion".

==== Birth control ====
Smucker is against codifying the right to birth control. He voted against the Right to Contraception Act in 2022.

==== Racial and LGBT rights ====
Smucker opposes gay marriage and voted against federally protecting gay and interracial marriages. He voted against allowing private lawsuits against schools who racially discriminate.

==== Taxes and federal spending ====
Smucker opposes an income tax increase, opposes federal spending, and supports lowering taxes as a means of promoting economic growth.

==== Education ====
Smucker opposes requiring states to adopt federal education standards. He supports leaving education standards to the state. As of July 2025, Smucker had an "F" rating from the National Education Association (NEA)'s scorecard measuring support for issues related to public education and educators.

==== Environment ====
Smucker opposes federal regulation of greenhouse gas emissions and assisting rural renewable energy. He voted to loosen restrictions on predator control in Alaska.

==== Gun rights ====
Smucker opposes gun-control legislation and voted twice against expanding background checks. In 2024, he is endorsed by the NRA Political Victory Fund.

==== Healthcare ====
Smucker supports repealing the Affordable Care Act and supports leaving healthcare to the states. He also supports patient flexibility and patients' rights; in the 119th Congress, he introduced the Hospital Inpatient Services Modernization Act to give patients flexibility to receive care in their homes.

==== Immigration ====
Smucker supports requiring immigrants who are unlawfully present to return to their country of origin before they are eligible for citizenship and supports bans on immigration for "non-cooperating" countries.

In 2021, Smucker was one of 30 Republicans who voted for the Farm Workforce Modernization Act, which would grant legal status to illegal immigrants working in agriculture and establish a pathway to permanent residency contingent on continued farm work.

In 2026, Smucker cosponsored the DIGNIDAD Act, which proposes a pathway to legal status for up to 12 million illegal immigrants, paired with stricter border enforcement and mandatory work and restitution requirements.

==== Foreign policy ====
Smucker supports increased American intervention in Iraq and Syria beyond air support.

Smucker is pro-Israel and supports keeping a United States embassy in Jerusalem.

He supported Donald Trump's strike on Iranian military leader Qasem Soleimani. In 2026, he supported Trump's decision to start the 2026 Iran War.

==== Social Security ====
Smucker supports allowing individuals to divert a portion of their Social Security taxes into personal retirement accounts. In 2024, he voted against legislation that would help pensioners receive their full Social Security benefits.

==== Donald Trump ====
Smucker voted twice against impeaching Trump and against forming the January 6th committee. Trump endorsed Smucker's 2022 reelection bid.

==== Death penalty ====
Smucker supports capital punishment and voted to expand the federal death penalty for killings of police officers.

==== Net neutrality ====
Smucker opposes net neutrality.

=== Committee assignments ===
- Committee on Ways and Means
  - Subcommittee on Oversight
  - Subcommittee on Worker and Family Support

=== Caucus memberships ===
- Republican Main Street Partnership
- Republican Study Committee
- Rare Disease Caucus

== Electoral history ==
=== 2018 ===
Pennsylvania's 11th congressional district, 2018
Party	Candidate	Votes	%
Republican	Lloyd Smucker (incumbent)	163,708	59.0
Democratic	Jess King	113,876	41.0
Total votes		277,584	100.0
Republican hold			

=== 2020 ===
Pennsylvania's 11th congressional district, 2020
Party	Candidate	Votes	%
Republican	Lloyd Smucker (incumbent)	241,915	63.1
Democratic	Sarah Hammond	141,325	36.9
Total votes		383,240	100.0
Republican hold			

=== 2022 ===
Pennsylvania's 11th congressional district, 2022
Party	Candidate	Votes	%
Republican	Lloyd Smucker (incumbent)	194,991	61.5
Democratic	Bob Hollister	121,835	38.5
Total votes		316,826	100.0
Republican hold			

=== 2024 ===
Pennsylvania's 11th congressional district, 2024
Party	Candidate	Votes	%
Republican	Lloyd Smucker (incumbent)	253,672	62.9
Democratic	Jim Atkinson	149,641	37.1
Total votes		403,313	100.0
Republican hold			

U.S. House of Representatives
Preceded by Joe Pitts	Member of the U.S. House of Representatives from Pennsylvania's 16th congressional district 2017–2019	Succeeded by Mike Kelly
Preceded by Lou Barletta	Member of the U.S. House of Representatives from Pennsylvania's 11th congressional district 2019–present	Incumbent
U.S. order of precedence (ceremonial)
Preceded by John Rutherford	United States representatives by seniority 177th	Succeeded by Darren Soto
