= John E. Barley =

American politician

Member of the Pennsylvania House of Representatives from the 100th district
- In office January 1, 1985 – April 2, 2002
- Preceded by: Gibson E. Armstrong
- Succeeded by: Gibson C. Armstrong

Republican Whip of the Pennsylvania House of Representatives
- In office January 3, 1995 – November 30, 1996
- Preceded by: John Perzel
- Succeeded by: Donald Snyder

Personal details
- Born: December 6, 1945 (age 80) Lancaster, Pennsylvania
- Party: Republican
- Spouse: Wendy L. Barley
- Occupation: Farmer

John E. Barley (born December 6, 1945) is an American former politician, who was a Republican member of the Pennsylvania House of Representatives for the 100th District.

He graduated from Penn Manor High School in 1963. He took Dale Carnegie Courses in 1977 and took an introductory law class at Penn University in 1990.

He was first elected to represent the 100th legislative district in the Pennsylvania House of Representatives in 1985. He served as Republican Caucus Secretary from 1991 to 1992, as Republican Policy Committee Chairman from 1993 to 1994, and as Majority Whip from 1995 to 1996. He was elected Majority Appropriations Chairman in 1997, a position he held until his retirement in 2002.

In 2002, he was named to the PoliticsPA list of Best Dressed Legislators, noting his fondness for Brooks Brothers suits. He is said to single-handedly keep his local Brooks Brothers store in business.

He resigned his House seat in late April 2002. He had first announced his intention to retire in early 2002, only to change his mind in March, when he unexpectedly showed up at a local party committee meeting, where he received the Republican Party endorsement, shocking all that were in attendance. He changed course again in March and announced his retirement, citing a growing controversy in his native Lancaster County over a portion of the Barley family farm to be sold to a landfill operated by Lancaster County for $24.7 million. Barley predicted that had he continued with his re-election plans, his opponents would have tried to "destroy" him and his family. Republican Gibson C. Armstrong, the son of Barley's predecessor Senator Gibson E. Armstrong, received the Republican endorsement and easily defeated Democrat Bruce Beardsley.

The former Representative Barley is married to 'Wendy L. Barley', as of December 2009, he has been living in Lancaster City, PA with his wife, Wendy Barley, where they are franchisees of the meterosexual-themed salon American Male. Barley also is the CEO of Versant Strategies.

He can currently be seen on the Pennsylvania Cable Network offering political analysis.
