= Gibson C. Armstrong =

American politician

Member of the Pennsylvania House of Representatives from the 100th district
- In office July 20, 2002 – November 30, 2006
- Preceded by: John Barley
- Succeeded by: Bryan Cutler

Personal details
- Born: 1967 (age 58–59) Marine Corps Air Station Cherry Point, North Carolina
- Party: Republican
- Parent: Gibson E. Armstrong (father)
- Education: United States Naval Academy (BS)
- Occupation: Business Development Executive

Military service
- Branch/service: United States Marine Corps
- Rank: Captain

Gibson C. Armstrong (born 1967 at Marine Corps Air Station Cherry Point) is an American politician and business development executive. He graduated from Lampeter-Strasburg High School, Pennsylvania. He served as a Republican member of the Pennsylvania House of Representatives, representing 100th legislative district from 2002 to 2006.

== Early life and education ==
Armstrong graduated from Lampeter-Strasburg High School in 1985. He attended Millersville University of Pennsylvania before earning a Bachelor of Science degree in political science from the United States Naval Academy in 1991. He also holds a diploma from the Command and Staff College of the Naval War College, Newport, RI.

== Military service ==
Armstrong served nine years in the United States Marine Corps, achieving the rank of captain. His roles included Deputy Comptroller and Executive Officer of the Marine Security Force Company at Patuxent River Naval Air Station.

== Political career ==
Armstrong was elected to the Pennsylvania House of Representatives in a special election on July 16, 2002, succeeding John Barley. He was subsequently re-elected for the 2003 and 2005 terms.

During his tenure, Armstrong served on several committees, including Appropriations, Environmental Resources and Energy, Aging and Older Adults, Transportation, and Veterans and Emergency Preparedness. Additionally, he chaired the Renewable Energy and Environmental Caucus and collaborated on the Governor's Penn Secure Fuels Initiative.

Armstrong cosponsored the 16-bill Keystone Manufacturing Initiative to cut business taxes and eliminate school property taxes.

Armstrong ran the Renewable Energy and Environmental Caucus and drafted a fuel standards bill for the Governor's Penn Secure Fuels Initiative. He was also a member of Penn Future.

He worked with Katie McGinty to stand up the Pennsylvania Energy Development Authority.

He held bipartisan hearings on education reform.

== Post-Legislative Career ==
After leaving the legislature, Armstrong served as Director of Government Relations for BlueStar Energy Services. He was appointed to the board of directors for the Pennsylvania Energy Development Authority, where he served until 2019. Armstrong has also been involved with faith-based non-profit organizations, serving as a board member, secretary, and a committee chair at Global Teen Challenge, a drug rehabilitation non-profit with a notably low recidivism rate.
