= Scott Martin (Pennsylvania politician) =

American politician from Pennsylvania

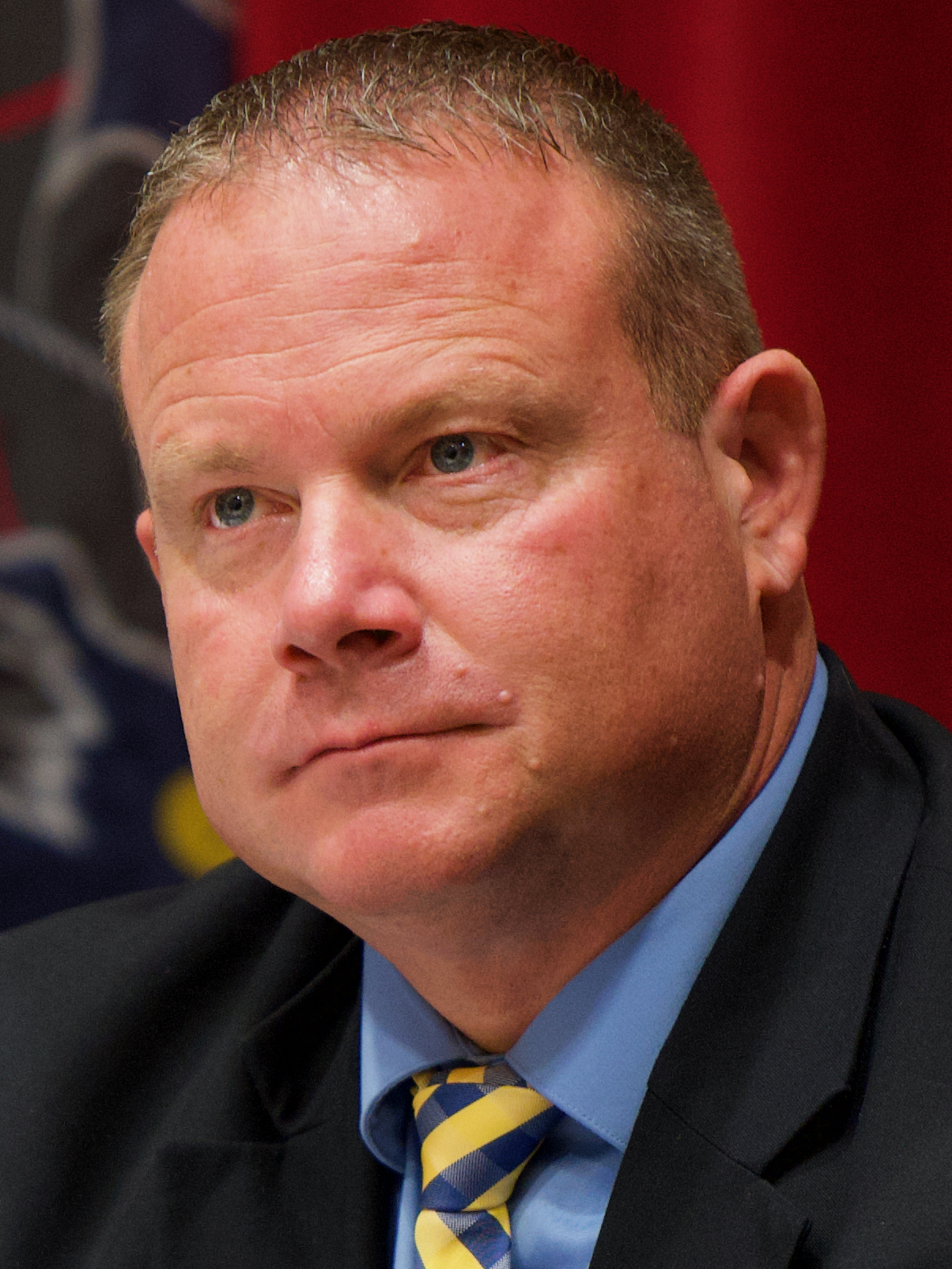

Member of the Pennsylvania Senate from the 13th district
- Incumbent
- Assumed office January 3, 2017
- Preceded by: Lloyd Smucker

Member of the Lancaster County Board of Commissioners
- In office January 7, 2008 – January 4, 2016 Serving with Dennis Stuckey, Craig Lehman
- Preceded by: Dick Shellenberger; Pete Shaub; Molly Henderson
- Succeeded by: Joshua Parsons

Personal details
- Born: 1972 or 1973 (age 52–53) Lancaster, Pennsylvania, U.S.
- Party: Republican
- Spouse: Amber Martin
- Education: Millersville University (BA)
- Website: Campaign website

Scott Martin (born 1972/1973) is an American politician from Pennsylvania who has been a Republican member of the Pennsylvania State Senate for the 13th district since January 3, 2017. He was previously a two-term Lancaster county commissioner and chairman of the Pennsylvania Republican County Commissioners Caucus. Martin is married to Amber Martin and they have four children. After a six-month exploratory committee, on December 11, 2021, Martin announced his intention to seek the office of governor of Pennsylvania. He suspended his gubernatorial bid on February 11, 2022, because of complications from a broken leg and other injuries suffered in an accident, resulting in surgery.

== Early life and education ==
Martin was born in Lancaster, Pennsylvania, and graduated from Lancaster Catholic High School and Millersville University with a degree in sociology/criminal justice.

He played professional American football in the Arena Football League.

== Political positions ==
=== Pediatric cancer ===
Martin authored legislation which was later signed into law as Act 73 of 2017, which allows Pennsylvanians to voluntarily donate $5 to the Pediatric Cancer Research Fund when electronically renewing a driver's license, photo identification card or vehicle registration.

Martin has pushed for legislation that would allow Pennsylvania businesses to apply for tax credits if they make a donation to certain Pennsylvania medical centers for the purposes of pediatric cancer research/treatment. The total amount of tax credits could not exceed $10 million in any one fiscal year and the program would last ten years.

=== Marijuana ===
Martin stated in 2019 that he is against the legalization of cannabis in Pennsylvania. In 2021, Martin voted for House Bill 1024, which allowed cannabis corporations to remediate moldy product and use additional pesticides, among other provisions. Martin voted against the home grow amendment for registered medical patients, Amendment No. A-2029, introduced by Senator Sharif Street in association with House Bill 1024.

=== Charter schools ===
As Education committee chair, Martin introduced legislation opposed by school boards and teachers’ unions that seeks to make it easier to open charter schools and to accelerate state taxpayer subsidies for private and parochial schools by hundreds of millions of dollars in the coming years. The bill also says that Charter schools would no longer be able to advertise themselves as "cost-free" or "free", as they often do in marketing themselves now. Additionally, it is said it would add transparency and accountability measures for charters to follow, as well as allowing all secondary schools to offer dual-enrollment programs with colleges.

== Committee assignments ==
For the 2025-2026 Session Martin serves as the Majority Appropriations Committee Chair and sits on the following committees in the State Senate:

- Appropriations (Chair)
- Banking & Insurance
- Environmental Resources & Energy

== Electoral history ==
Pennsylvania Senate, District 13, 2016 Republican Primary
Party	Candidate	Votes	%
Republican	Scott Martin	17,142	49.23
Republican	Neal Rice	12,654	36.34
Republican	Ethan Demme	4,977	14.29
Write-in		49	0.14
Total votes		34,822	100.00

Pennsylvania Senate, District 13, 2016
Party	Candidate	Votes	%
Republican	Scott Martin	66,595	57.78
Democratic	Greg Paulson	48,476	42.06
Write-in		180	0.16
Total votes		115,251	100.00
Republican hold			

Pennsylvania Senate, District 13, 2020
Party	Candidate	Votes	%
Republican	Scott Martin (incumbent)	73,204	55.55
Democratic	Janet Diaz	58,419	44.33
Write-in		145	0.11
Total votes		131,768	100.00
Republican hold			
