= Gibson E. Armstrong =

American politician

Member of the Pennsylvania House of Representatives from the 100th district
- In office January 4, 1977 – November 30, 1984
- Preceded by: Sherman Hill
- Succeeded by: John Barley

Member of the Pennsylvania Senate from the 13th district
- In office January 1, 1985 – November 30, 2008
- Preceded by: Richard Snyder
- Succeeded by: Lloyd Smucker

Personal details
- Born: August 28, 1943 (age 83)
- Party: Republican
- Spouse: Martha Wilson
- Education: Westminster College

Gibson E. Armstrong (born August 28, 1943) is an American politician from Pennsylvania who served as a Republican member of the Pennsylvania State Senate for the 13th district from 1984 to 2009. He was a member of the Pennsylvania House of Representatives for the 100th district from 1977 to 1984.

== Early life and education ==
Armstrong was born in Butler, Pennsylvania to S. Gibson and Helene Burns Armstrong. He graduated with a BBA from Westminster College in 1965. He served as a Captain in the U.S. Marine Corps from 1966 to 1969 in the Vietnam War.

== Career ==
Armstrong chaired the Appropriations Committee and Banking and Insurance Committees and was a member of the Finance Committee, Labor and Industry Committee, Rules Committee and the Urban Affairs Committee.

His son, Gibson C. Armstrong, held his father's former state house seat from 2002 to 2006, when he was defeated in the Republican primary due to voter anger at the 2005 legislative pay raise. The elder Armstrong had supported, voted for and accepted the pay raise, while the younger Armstrong voted against it and did not take it.
