= Hospital Inpatient Services Modernization Act =

The Hospital Inpatient Services Modernization Act is a bill in the U.S. Senate and U.S. House of Representatives introduced in 2025 that would enable hospitals to extend successful Hospital at Home programs for an additional five years.

== Bill summary ==
This bill would extend the Acute Hospital Care at Home (AHCaH) program through 2030. It also directs the U.S. Department of Health and Human Services to conduct a study on the program's efficacy.

== Legislative activity ==
On July 10, 2025, Senators Raphael Warnock and Tim Scott introduced S.2237, the Hospital Inpatient Services Modernization Act. On the same day, Representative Vern Buchanan introduced H.R.4313 as companion legislation. Representatives Lloyd Smucker and Dwight Evans are the original cosponsors of the House bill. In the Senate, the bill was referred to the Senate Committee on Finance.

The bill's goal of a five-year extension was achieved instead by the Consolidated Appropriations Act of 2026, which extended the AHCaH initiative through 2030 while mandating further study into the efficacy of hospital-at-home programs.
