= Solanco High School =

Coordinates: 39.8669°N 76.1541°W

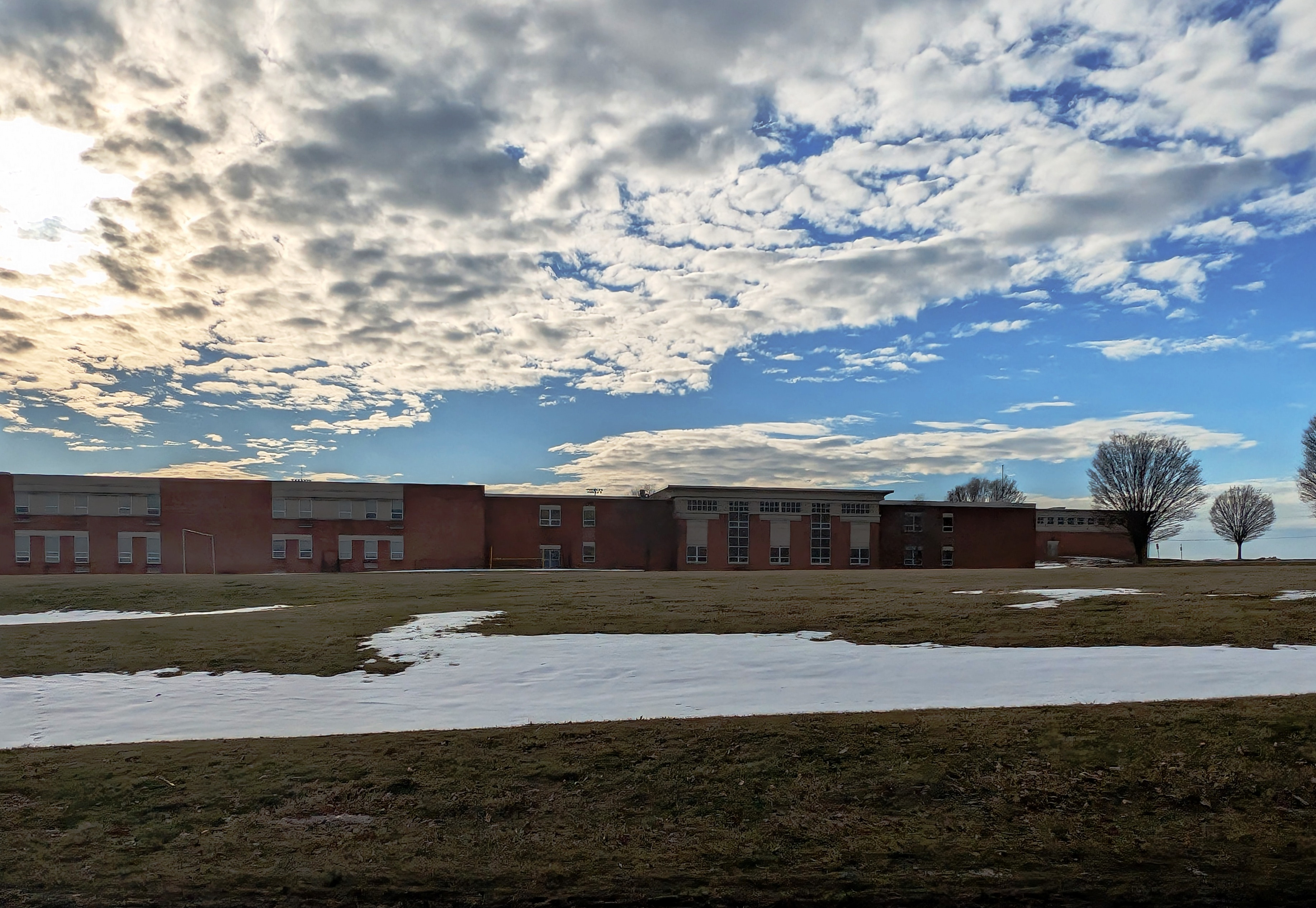

Location
- 585 Solanco Road; Quarryville, Lancaster, Pennsylvania, 17566; United States

Information
- School type: Public, secondary
- School district: Solanco School District
- Principal: Dr. Scott Long
- Staff: 63.80 (FTE)
- Grades: 9th–12th
- Student to teacher ratio: 16.55
- Colors: Black and gold
- Mascot: Golden Mule
- Website: https://www.solancosd.org/solanco-high-school/

Solanco High School is a midsized, rural, public secondary school located in southern Lancaster County in Pennsylvania, United States. It is a part of the Solanco School District. According to the National Center for Education Statistics, in the 2018–2019 school year, the school reported an enrollment of 1,056 pupils in grades 9th through 12th.

== Extracurriculars ==
Solanco School District offers a variety of clubs, activities and an extensive sports program.

=== Sports ===
The district funds:

Boys

- Baseball - 5A
- Basketball- 5A
- Cross country - AAA
- Football - 5A
- Golf - AAAA
- Indoor track and field - AAAA
- Soccer - AAA
- Track and field - AAA
- Wrestling - AAA

Girls

- Basketball - 5A
- Cross country - AAA
- Field hockey - AAA
- Indoor track and field - AAAA
- Soccer (Fall) - AAA
- Softball - 5A
- Tennis - AAA
- Track and field - AAA
- Volleyball - AAA

== Notable alumni ==
- Bryan Cutler, Class of 1993. Politician
- Don Wert, Class of 1956. Professional baseball player, Detroit Tigers.
- Šarūnas Jasikevičius, Class of 1994. Professional basketball player and coach, the 2005 Israeli Basketball Premier League MVP.
