= Sherman L. Hill =

American politician

Member of the Pennsylvania House of Representatives from the 100th district
- In office January 7, 1969 – November 30, 1976
- Preceded by: District Created
- Succeeded by: Gib Armstrong

Member of the Pennsylvania House of Representatives from the Lancaster County district
- In office 1967–1968

Personal details
- Born: December 4, 1911 Lancaster County, Pennsylvania, U.S.
- Died: March 8, 1984 (aged 72) Lancaster, Pennsylvania, U.S.
- Party: Republican

Sherman L. Hill (December 4, 1911 – March 8, 1984) was a former Republican member of the Pennsylvania House of Representatives. Hill was born in Manor Township, Lancaster County, PA. He graduated from Penn Manor High School, Millersville State College, and Temple University. Hill was elected to the Pennsylvania House of Representatives as a republican in 1965. He was then reelected for 4 consecutive terms.
