= USCGC Richard Snyder =

27th Sentinel-class cutter for the US coastguard

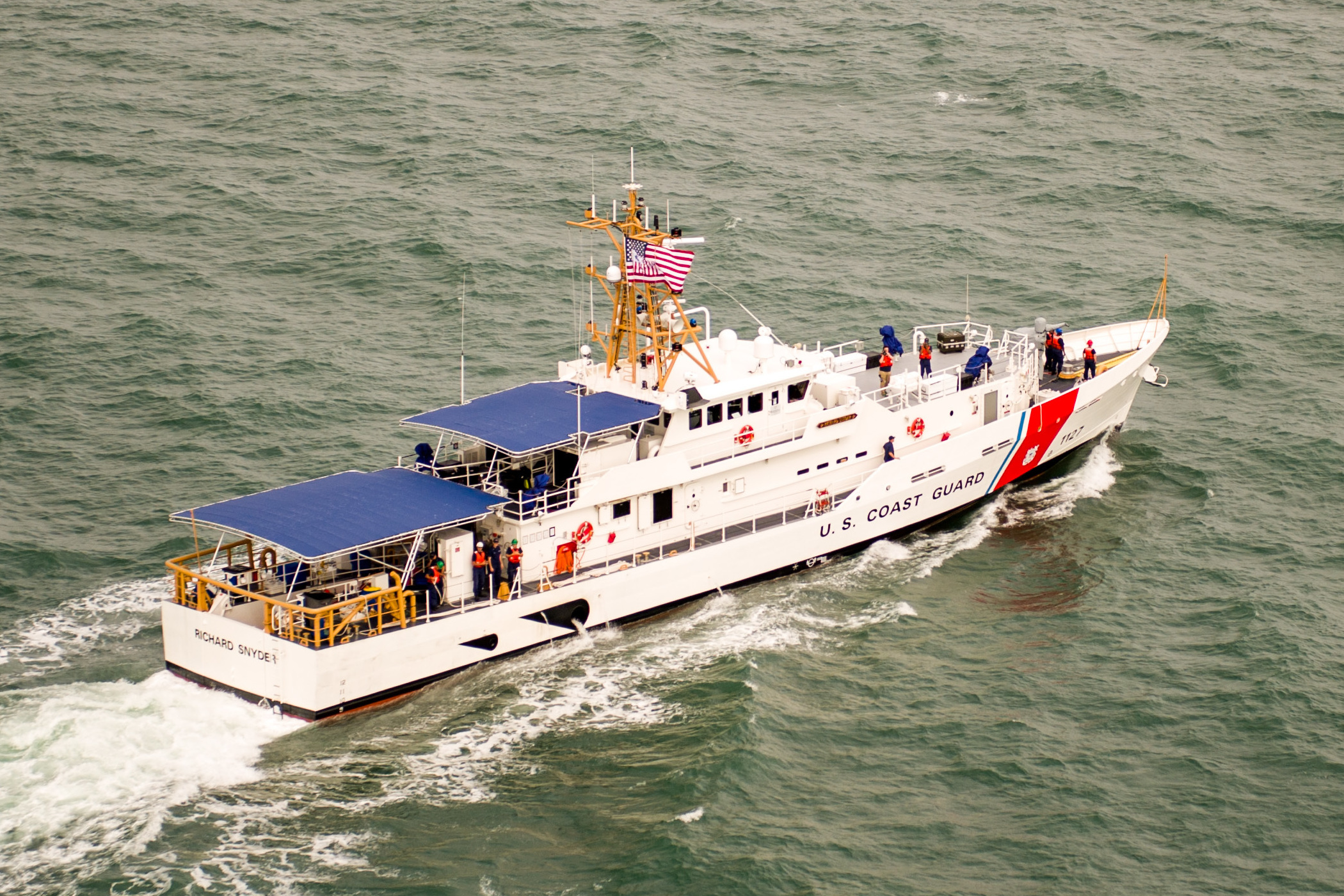
- Richard Snyder arriving at her homeport

History

United States
- Name: Richard Snyder
- Namesake: Richard Snyder
- Operator: United States Coast Guard
- Builder: Bollinger Shipyards, Lockport, Louisiana
- Launched: February 8, 2018
- Acquired: February 8, 2018
- Commissioned: April 20, 2018
- Home port: Atlantic Beach
- Identification: MMSI number: 338926427; Callsign: NRIS; Hull number: WPC-1127
- Motto: Never yield
- Status: in active service
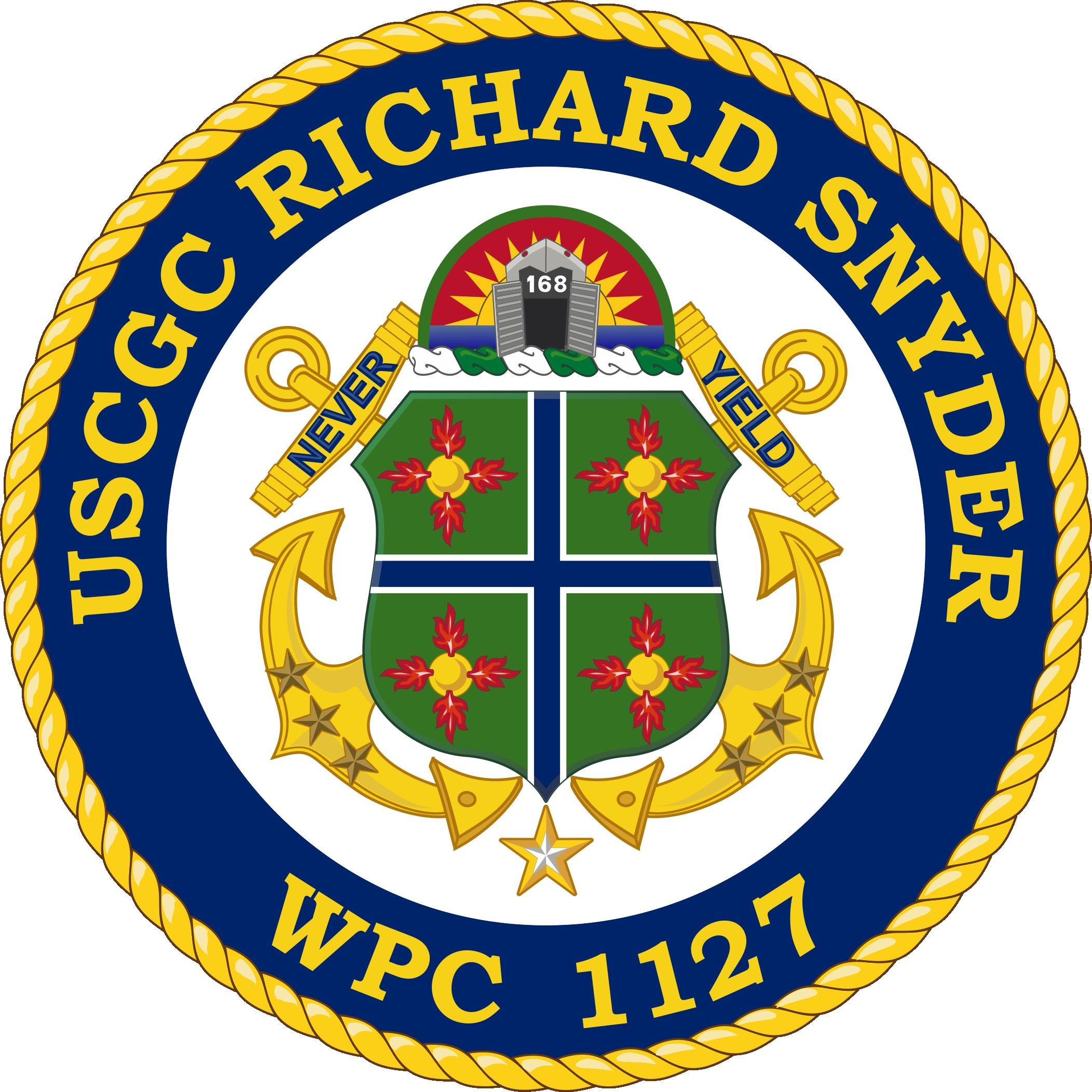
- Badge

General characteristics
- Class & type: Sentinel-class cutter
- Displacement: 353 long tons (359 t)
- Length: 46.8 m (154 ft)
- Beam: 8.11 m (26.6 ft)
- Depth: 2.9 m (9.5 ft)
- Propulsion: 2 × 4,300 kW (5,800 shp); 1 × 75 kW (101 shp) bow thruster
- Speed: 28 knots (52 km/h; 32 mph)
- Range: 2,500 nautical miles (4,600 km; 2,900 mi)
- Endurance: 5 days
- Boats & landing craft carried: 1 × Cutter Boat - Over the Horizon Interceptor
- Complement: 4 officers, 20 enlisted
- Sensors & processing systems: L-3 C4ISR suite
- Armament: 1 × Mk 38 Mod 2 25 mm automatic gun; 4 × crew-served Browning M2 machine guns

USCGC Richard Snyder (WPC-1127) is the 27th Sentinel-class cutter built for the United States Coast Guard. She is the first of her class to be home-ported in Atlantic Beach, North Carolina.

== Design ==
Like her sister ships, the Richard Snyder is built to carry out search and rescue operations, ensure port security, and intercept smugglers. She is armed with a remotely controlled, gyrostabilized 25 mm autocannon, four crew-served M2 Browning machine guns, and light arms. She is equipped with a stern launching ramp that allows her to launch or retrieve a water-jet propelled high-speed auxiliary boat without first coming to a stop. Her high-speed boat has over-the-horizon capability and is useful for inspecting other vessels and deploying boarding parties. She is designed to support her crew of 24 for missions of up to five days over distances of almost 3,000 nautical miles (5,556 km; 3,452 mi).

== Operational history ==
Richard Snyder was delivered to a Coast Guard base in Key West for her sea trials on February 8, 2018. She was commissioned on April 20, 2018, at her home port in Atlantic Beach, North Carolina.

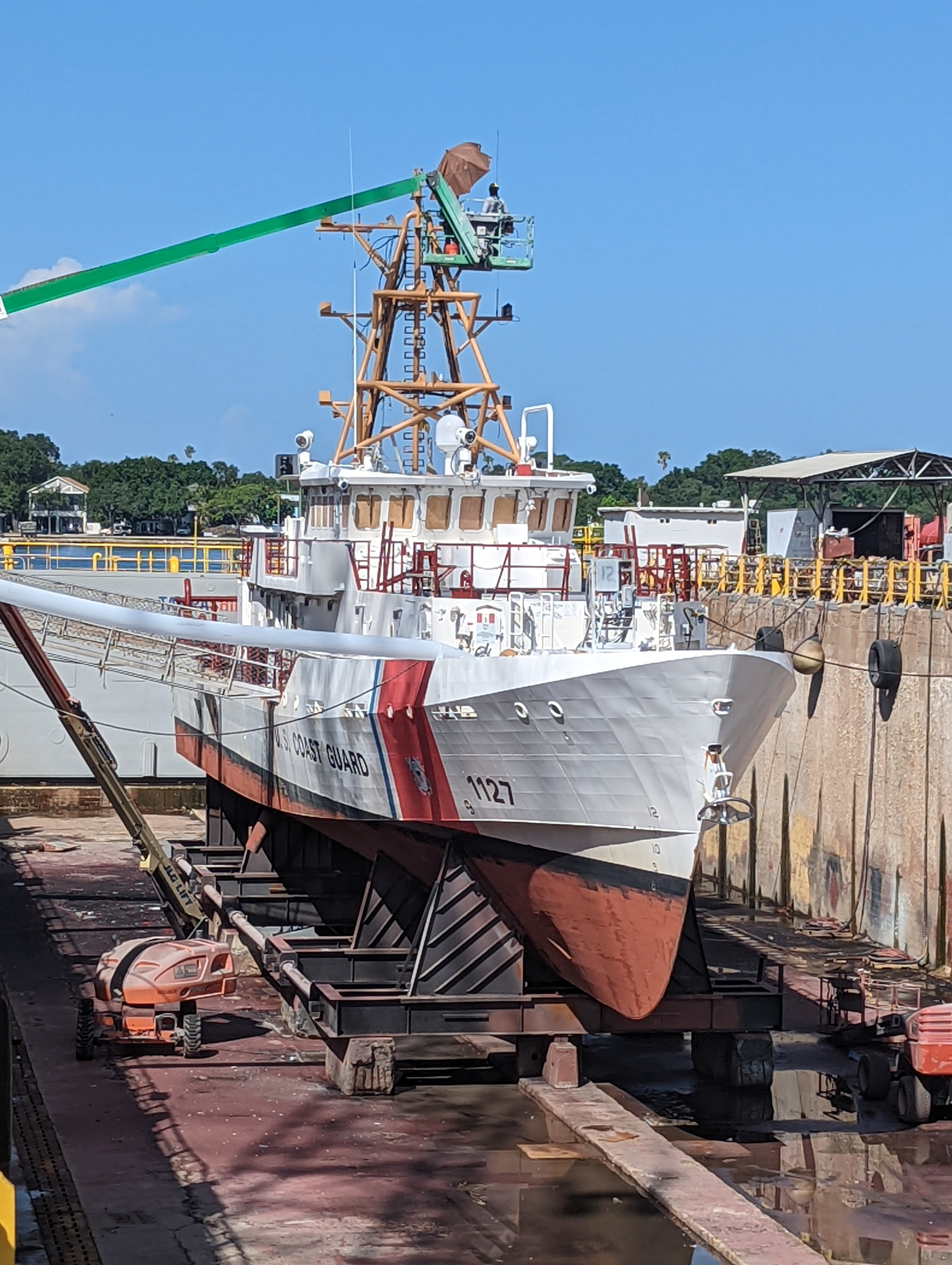
- Richard Snyder in Tampa, FL during drydock.

== Namesake ==
In 2010, Charles "Skip" W. Bowen, who was then the United States Coast Guard's most senior non-commissioned officer, proposed that all 58 cutters in the Sentinel class should be named after enlisted sailors in the Coast Guard, or one of its precursor services, who were recognized for their heroism. In 2015, the Coast Guard announced that Richard Snyder, who was awarded a Silver Star for attacking Japanese ground forces during an amphibious assault on the island of Biak, would be the namesake of the 27th cutter.
