= Richard A. Snyder =

American politician

Member of the Pennsylvania Senate from the 13th district
- In office November 11, 1962 – November 30, 1984
- Preceded by: Edward Kessler
- Succeeded by: Gibson E. Armstrong

Personal details
- Born: March 26, 1910 Lititz, Pennsylvania, US
- Died: June 17, 1992 (aged 82) Lancaster, Pennsylvania, US

Richard A. Snyder (March 26, 1910 – June 17, 1992) was an American politician from Pennsylvania who served as a Republican member of the Pennsylvania State Senate for the 13th district from 1961 to 1984.

== Early life and education ==
Snyder was born in Lititz, Pennsylvania, to Paris F. and Barbara (Ziegler) Snyder.

He graduated from Temple University Law School and worked as a staff writer for the Lancaster New Era newspaper from 1931 to 1942.

He served as a member of the United States Army Counter Intelligence Corps from 1942 to 1945.

== Career ==
He served as a member of the Pennsylvania State Senate for the 13th district for six consecutive terms from 1962 to 1984. He served on the Senate Appropriations Committee, Public Health and Welfare Committee, Education Committee and Labor and Education Committee.

He died on June 17, 1992.
