= Native holly =

Native holly is a common name for several Australian plants and may refer to:

- Alchornea ilicifolia, in the family Euphorbiaceae
- Lomatia ilicifolia, in the family Proteaceae
- Platylobium obtusangulum, in the family Fabaceae
