= Eden Township, Pennsylvania =

Township in Pennsylvania, US

Coordinates: 39°55′00″N 76°06′59″W

- Township
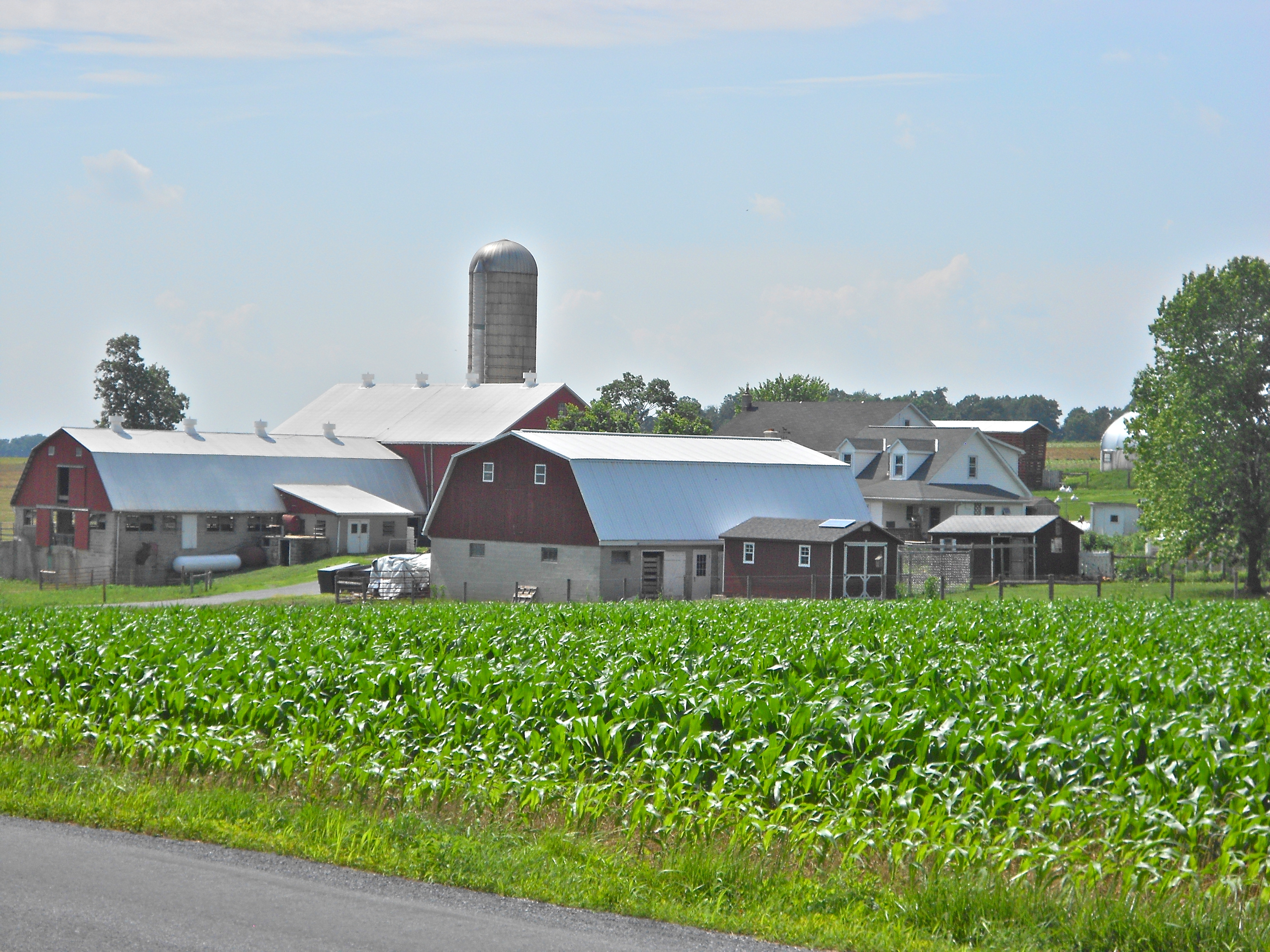
- Farm near the township office

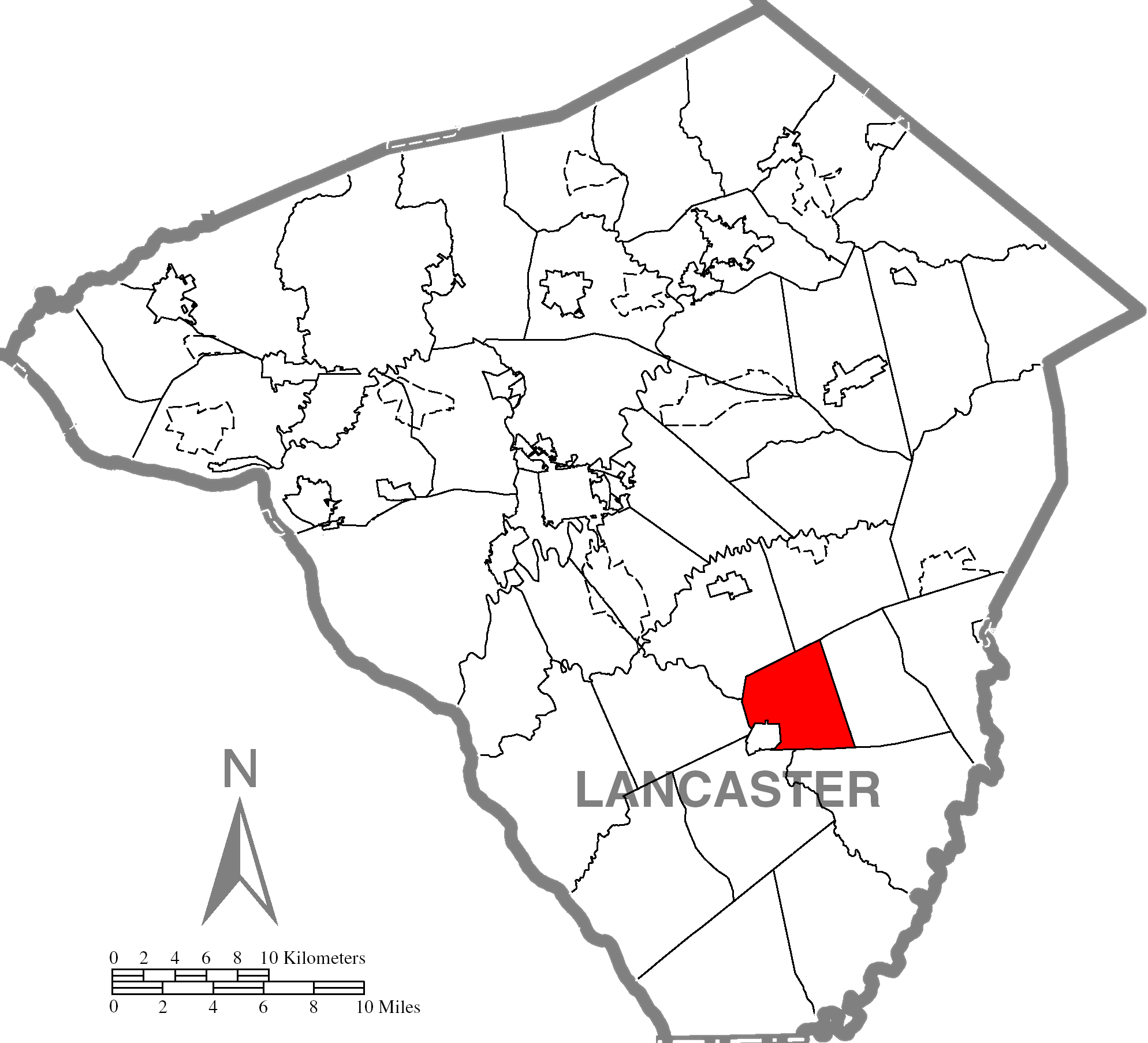
- Map of Lancaster County, Pennsylvania highlighting Eden Township

- Map of Lancaster County, Pennsylvania
- Country: United States
- State: Pennsylvania
- County: Lancaster
- Settled: 1830
- Incorporated: 1855

Government
  - Type: Board of Supervisors

Area
  - Total: 12.57 sq mi (32.55 km^{2})
  - Land: 12.53 sq mi (32.46 km^{2})
  - Water: 0.031 sq mi (0.08 km^{2})

Population (2020)
  - Total: 2,248 ▲
  - Estimate (2021): 2,254
  - Density: 173/sq mi (66.9/km^{2})
- Time zone: UTC-5 (Eastern (EST))
  - Summer (DST): UTC-4 (EDT)
- Area code: 717
- FIPS code: 42-071-22336
- Website: www.edentownship.org

Eden Township is a township in southeastern Lancaster County, Pennsylvania, United States. At the 2020 census, the population was 2,248. It is part of the Solanco School District.

== History ==
Eden Township was named for the furnace at Mount Eden.

What is now Eden Township was part of Sadsbury, Chester County before the formation of Lancaster County.

In 1744, Sadsbury Township was split into two; the western part was organized as Bart Township and the eastern part remained Sadsbury Township. In 1854, Bart Township was split into two, with the western part organized as Eden Township, and the eastern part remaining Bart Township.

== Geography ==
According to the U.S. Census Bureau, the township has a total area of 12.4 square miles (32 km^{2}), all land. Unincorporated communities in the township include Camargo, Hawksville, and Conners Mill. The borough of Quarryville borders the southwestern corner of the township.

== Demographics ==
Historical population
| Census | Pop. | Note | %± |
|---|---|---|---|
| 2000 | 1,856 | | — |
| 2010 | 2,094 | | 12.8% |
| 2020 | 2,248 | | 7.4% |
| 2021 (est.) | 2,254 | | 0.3% |
U.S. Decennial Census

At the 2000 census there were 1,856 people, 578 households, and 476 families living in the township. The population density was 149.4 inhabitants per square mile (57.7/km^{2}). There were 606 housing units at an average density of 48.8 units per square mile (18.8 units/km^{2}). The racial makeup of the township was 98.81% White, 0.48% Black or African American, 0.11% Asian, 0.05% Pacific Islander, 0.11% from other races, and 0.43% from two or more races. 0.97% of the population were Hispanic or Latino of any race. There were 578 households, 43.4% had children under the age of 18 living with them, 72.8% were married couples living together, 5.7% had a female householder with no husband present, and 17.5% were non-families. 14.0% of households were made up of individuals, and 6.6% were one person aged 65 or older. The average household size was 3.21 and the average family size was 3.57.

The age distribution was 34.1% under the age of 18, 10.1% from 18 to 24, 25.9% from 25 to 44, 21.8% from 45 to 64, and 8.2% 65 or older. The median age was 30 years. For every 100 females, there were 99.8 males. For every 100 females age 18 and over, there were 95.2 males.

The median household income was $44,620 and the median family income was $47,857. Males had a median income of $34,917 versus $21,638 for females. The per capita income for the township was $16,764. About 7.5% of families and 8.9% of the population were below the poverty line, including 11.2% of those under age 18 and 6.0% of those age 65 or over.

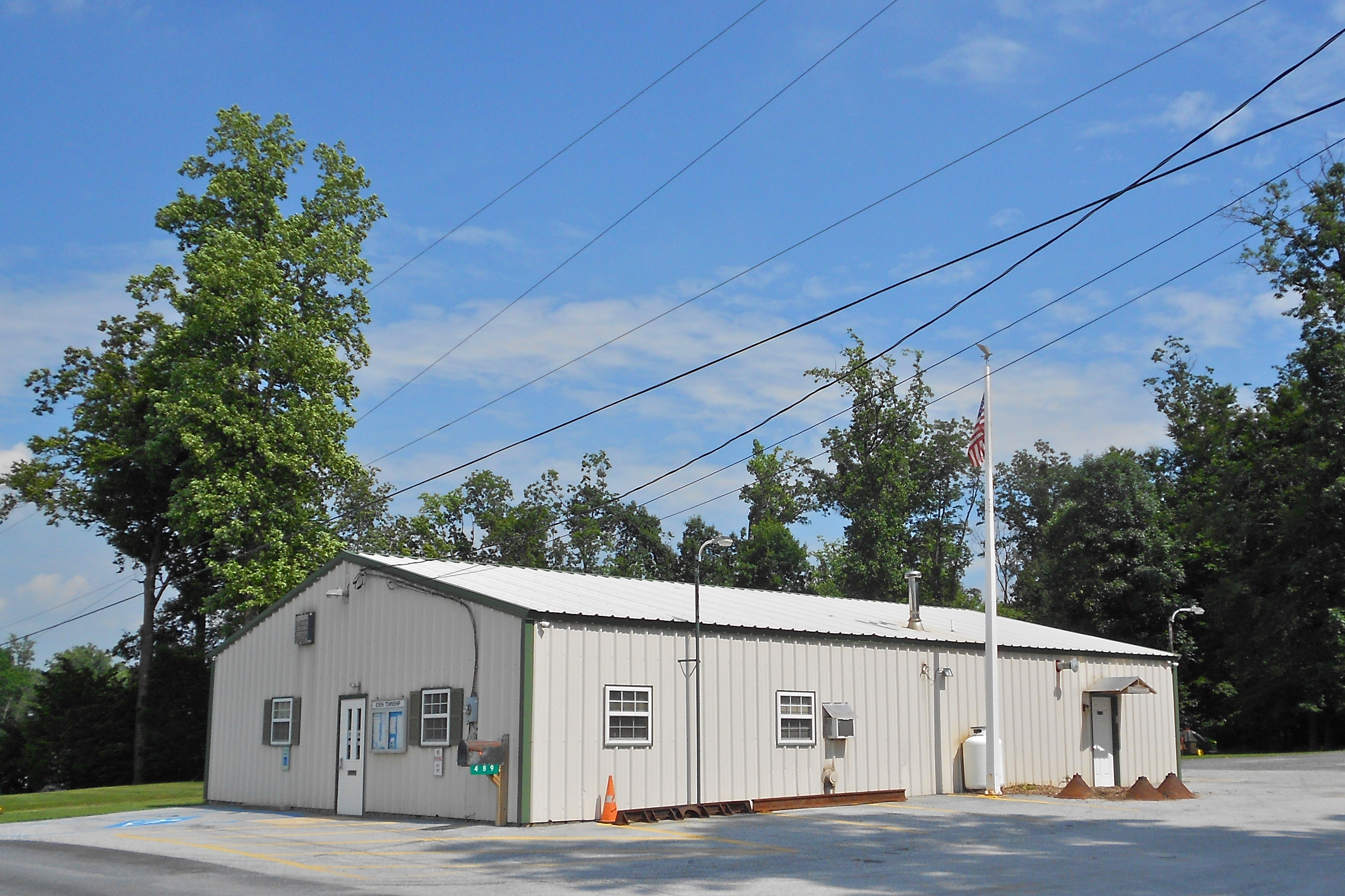
Township office

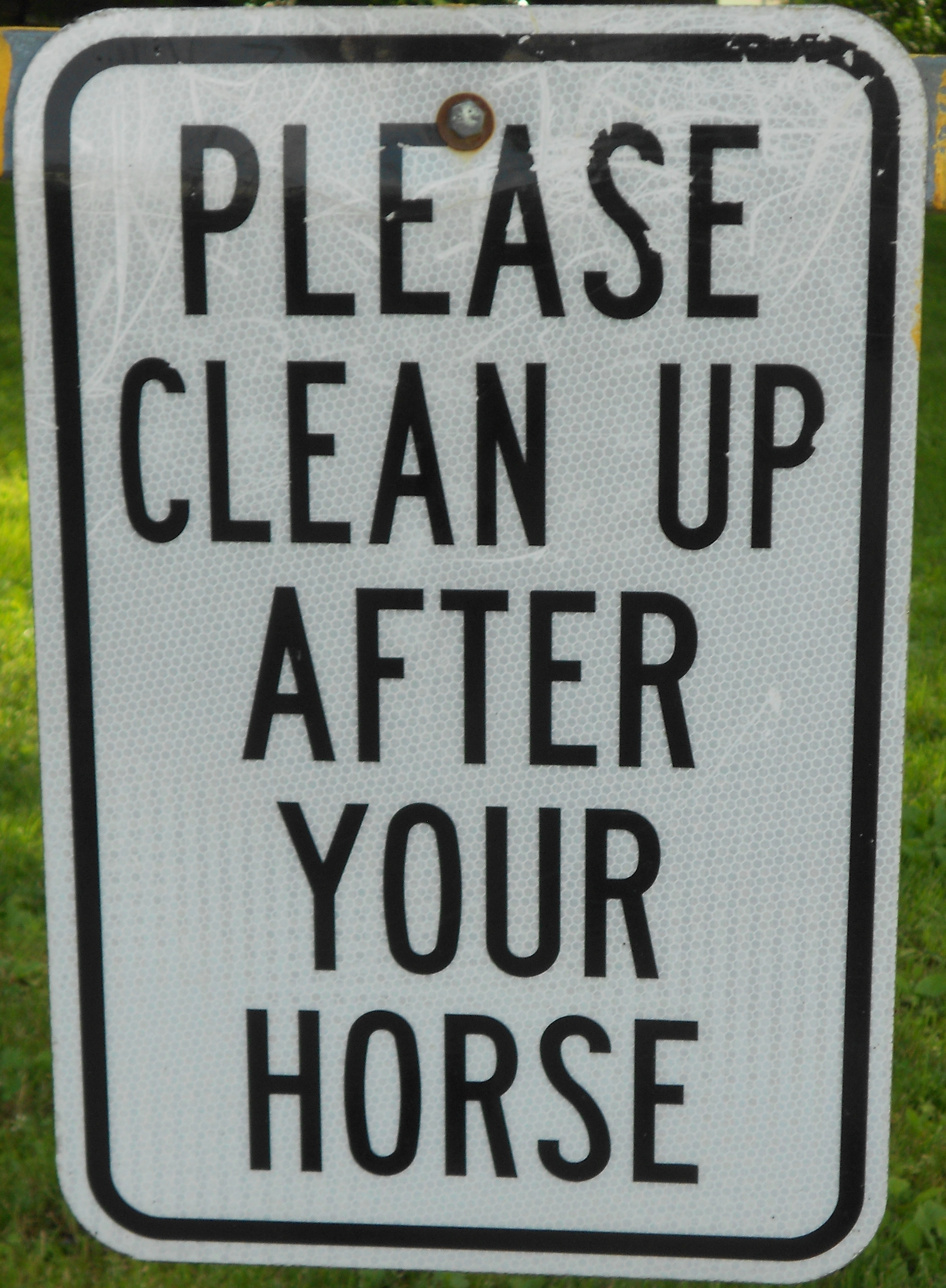
Sign in the township office parking lot on the hitching rail for Amish buggies
