= Drumore Township, Pennsylvania =

Township in Pennsylvania, US

Coordinates: 39°49′20″N 76°07′23″W

- Township
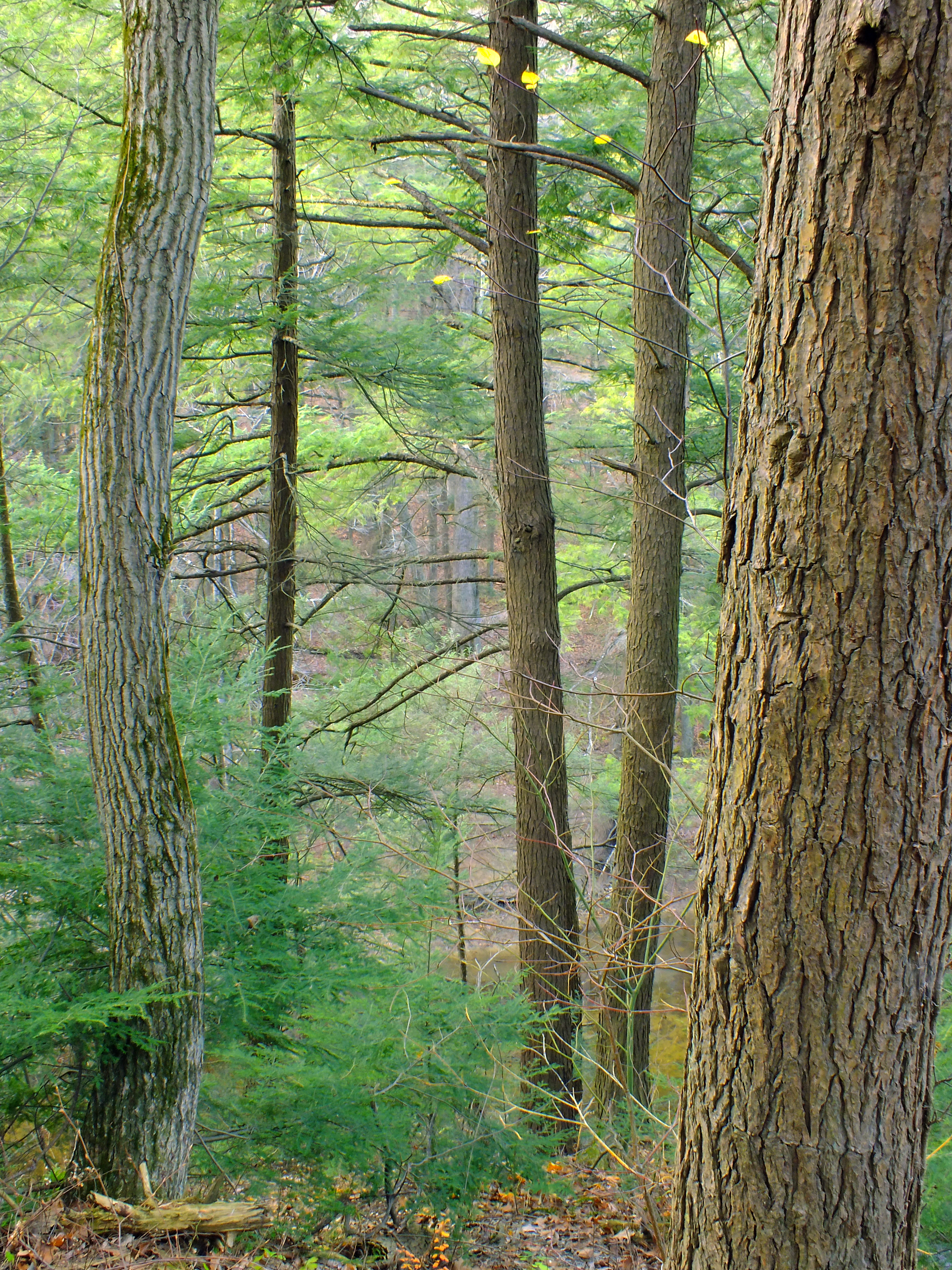
- Fishing Creek Nature Preserve

- Logo

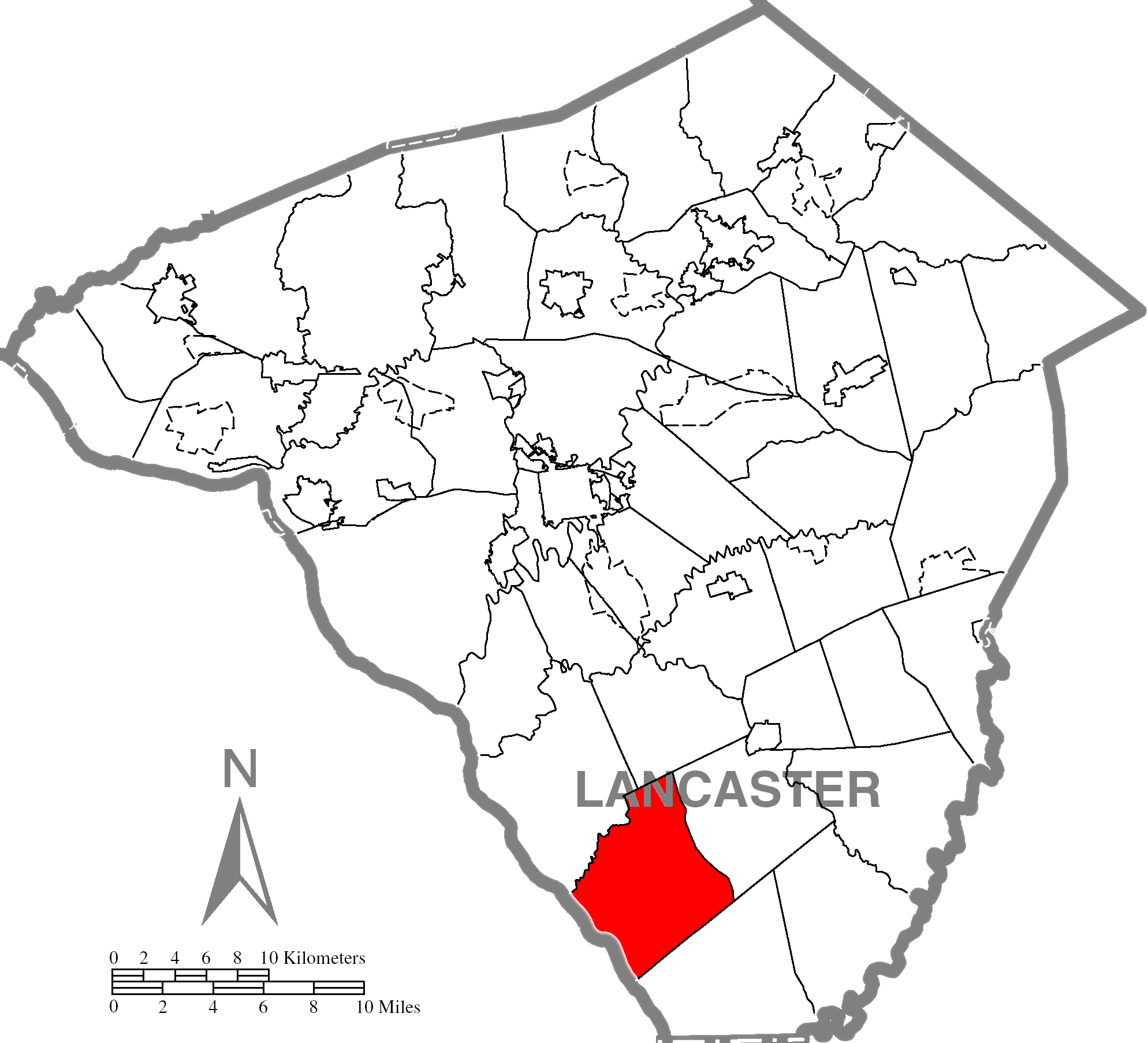
- Map of Lancaster County, Pennsylvania highlighting Drumore Township

- Map of Lancaster County, Pennsylvania
- Country: United States
- State: Pennsylvania
- County: Lancaster
- Incorporated: 1729

Government
  - Type: Board of Supervisors

Area
  - Total: 28.97 sq mi (75.03 km^{2})
  - Land: 24.03 sq mi (62.24 km^{2})
  - Water: 4.94 sq mi (12.79 km^{2})

Population (2020)
  - Total: 2,568 ▲
  - Estimate (2021): 2,591
  - Density: 109.0/sq mi (42.09/km^{2})
- Time zone: UTC-5 (Eastern (EST))
  - Summer (DST): UTC-4 (EDT)
- Area code: 717
- FIPS code: 42-071-20032
- Website: www.drumoretownship.org

Drumore Township is a township in southwestern Lancaster County, Pennsylvania, United States. At the 2020 census, the population was 2,568.

It is named after Dromore (Irish: Droim Mór), County Down, now in Northern Ireland, with which it has been twinned since 1996.

== Geography ==
According to the U.S. Census Bureau, the township has a total area of 28.9 square miles (75 km^{2}), of which 23.9 square miles (62 km^{2}) is land and 5.0 square miles (13 km^{2}) (17.36%) is water. It includes the communities of Liberty Square, Chestnut Level, Fernglen, Drumore, Furniss, and Fairfield, and parts of the communities of Buck and Henzel.

== Demographics ==
Historical population
Census	Pop.	Note	%±
2000	2,243		—
2010	2,560		14.1%
2021 (est.)	2,591
U.S. Decennial Census

As of the census of 2000, there were 2,243 people, 739 households, and 597 families residing in the township. The population density was 93.8 inhabitants per square mile (36.2/km^{2}). There were 819 housing units at an average density of 34.3 units per square mile (13.2 units/km^{2}). The racial makeup of the township was 98.75% White, 0.27% Black or African American, 0.09% Native American, 0.09% Asian, 0.27% from other races, and 0.53% from two or more races. 0.71% of the population were Hispanic or Latino of any race.

There were 739 households, out of which 38.8% had children under the age of 18 living with them, 71.7% were married couples living together, 5.4% had a female householder with no husband present, and 19.2% were non-families. 16.4% of all households were made up of individuals, and 6.2% had someone living alone who was 65 years of age or older. The average household size was 3.04 and the average family size was 3.44.

In the township the population was spread out, with 32.0% under the age of 18, 8.6% from 18 to 24, 27.9% from 25 to 44, 22.5% from 45 to 64, and 9.1% who were 65 years of age or older. The median age was 34 years. For every 100 females, there were 104.3 males. For every 100 females age 18 and over, there were 106.5 males.

The median income for a household in the township was $47,250, and the median income for a family was $51,645. Males had a median income of $36,366 versus $22,560 for females. The per capita income for the township was $17,470. About 4.0% of families and 5.1% of the population were below the poverty line, including 7.2% of those under age 18 and 6.5% of those age 65 or over.

== Parks and recreation ==
=== Drumore Township Park ===
The Drumore Township Park is located at 1675 Furniss Road, Drumore, Pennsylvania and is located on 10 acres (40,000 m^{2}) of land immediately in back of the Township Municipal Building. The land was purchased from the John O’Donnel farm with grant money from the county.

The Park is open to the public each day of the week from sun up to sun down.

=== Fishing Creek ===
Fishing Creek Nature Preserve is a 167-acre (0.68 km^{2}) preserve of mature forest along fishing creek, a creek that runs into the Susquehanna River. The creek is one of the few places in Lancaster County where a natural trout population remains. A dirt road runs along the stream, and there are several trails through the woods.

== Schools ==
Drumore Township is served by the Solanco School District. Schools in the district are:

Solanco High School 585 Solanco Road, Quarryville, PA 17566 (717)786-2151

George A. Smith Middle School 645 Kirkwood Pike, Quarryville, PA 17566 (717)786-2244

Swift Middle School 1866 Robert Fulton Highway, Quarryville, PA 17566 (717)548-2187

Providence Elementary School 137 Truce Road, New Providence, PA 17560 (717)786-3582

Quarryille Elementary School 211 South Hess Street, Quarryville, PA 17566 (717)786-2546

Clermont Elementary School 1868 Robert Fulton Highway, Quarryville, PA 17566 (717)548-2742

Bart Colerain Elementary School 1336 Noble Road, Christiana, PA 17509 (717)529-2181

== Notable people ==
- William Whipper, abolitionist
- John Steele, Brigadier General
