= Providence Township, Lancaster County, Pennsylvania =

Township in Pennsylvania, US

Coordinates: 39°52′29″N 76°15′05″W

Providence Township, Pennsylvania
- Township
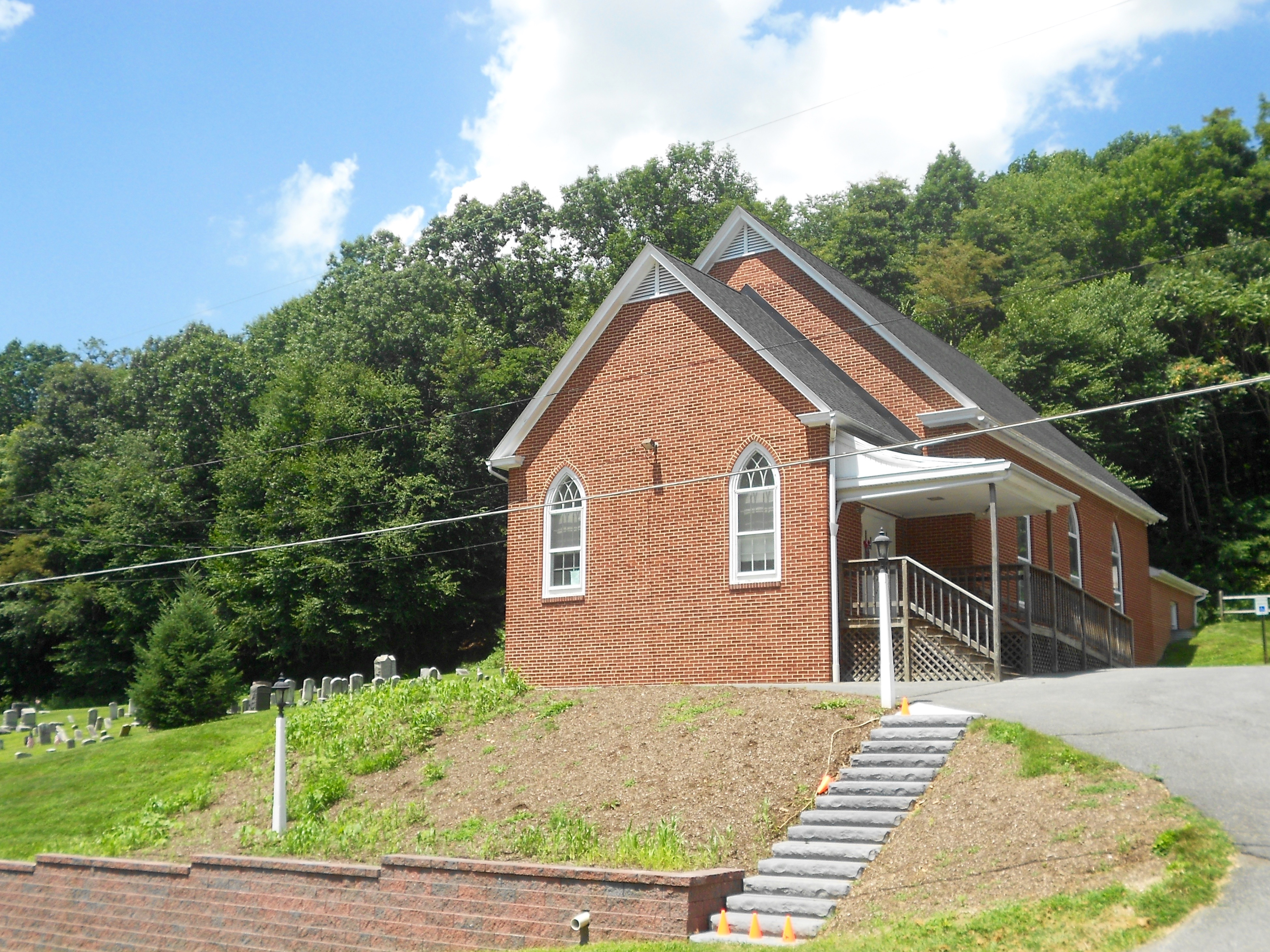
- Smithville Church of God

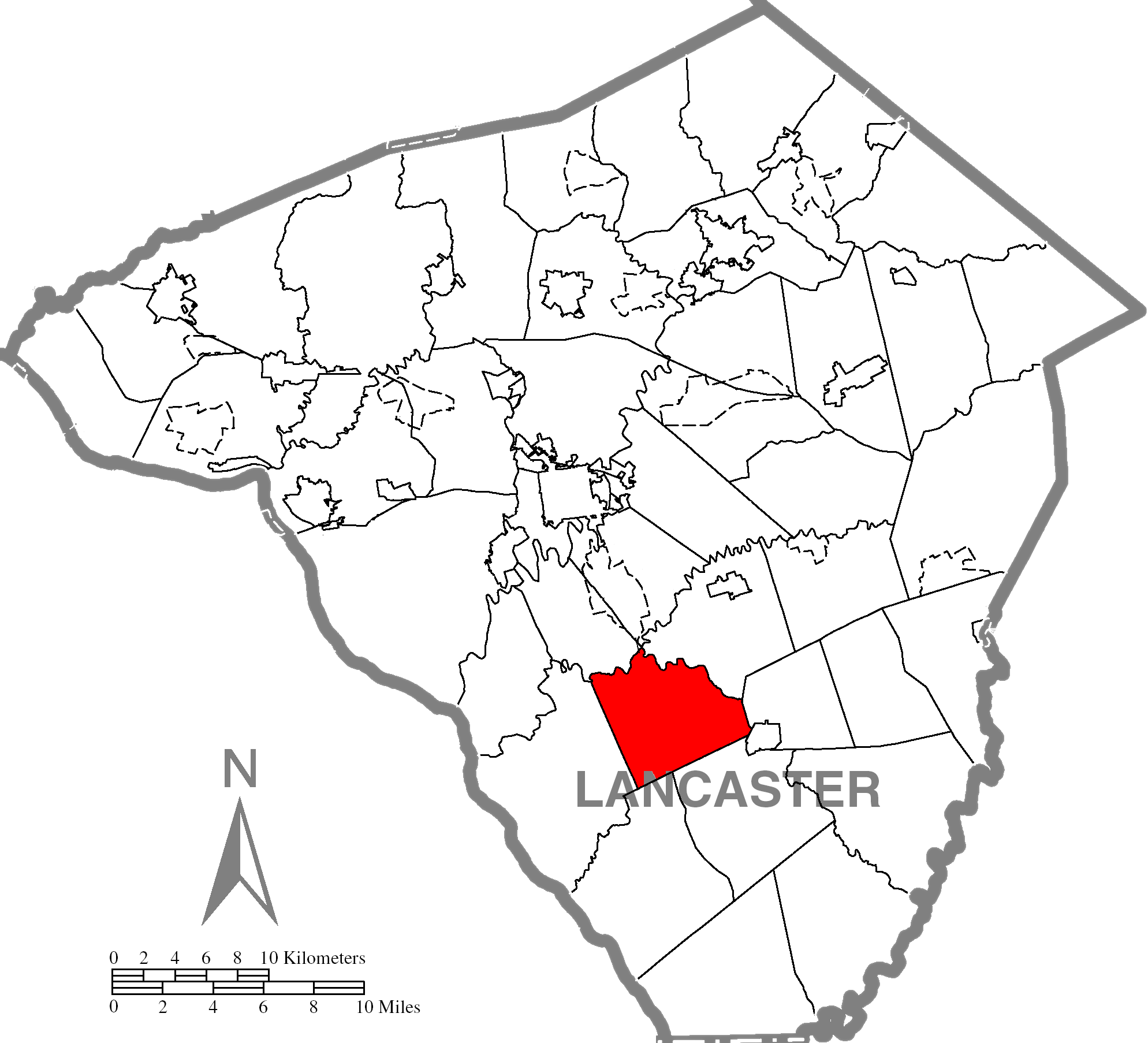
- Map of Lancaster County, Pennsylvania highlighting Providence Township

- Map of Lancaster County, Pennsylvania
- Country: United States
- State: Pennsylvania
- County: Lancaster
- Settled: 1720
- Incorporated: 1853

Government
  - Type: Board of Supervisors

Area
  - Total: 20.01 sq mi (51.82 km^{2})
  - Land: 19.88 sq mi (51.48 km^{2})
  - Water: 0.13 sq mi (0.34 km^{2})

Population (2020)
  - Total: 7,025 ▲
  - Estimate (2021): 7,007
  - Density: 350.6/sq mi (135.36/km^{2})
- Time zone: UTC-5 (Eastern (EST))
  - Summer (DST): UTC-4 (EDT)
- Area code: 717
- FIPS code: 42-071-62832
- Website: providencetownship.com

Providence Township is a township that is located in south central Lancaster County, Pennsylvania, United States. The population was 7,025 at the time of the 2020 census.

It is part of the Solanco School District.

== Geography ==
According to the United States Census Bureau, the township has a total area of 20.2 square miles (52.2 km^{2}), all land.

This township includes the unincorporated communities of Smithville, New Providence, Union, and Truce.

== Demographics ==
Historical population
Census	Pop.	Note	%±
2000	6,651		—
2010	6,897		3.7%
2020	7,025		1.9%
2021 (est.)	7,007		−0.3%
U.S. Decennial Census

At the time of the 2000 census, there were 6,651 people, 2,387 households, and 1,847 families living in the township.

The population density was 330.3 inhabitants per square mile (127.5/km^{2}). There were 2,486 housing units at an average density of 123.4 per square mile (47.6/km^{2}).

The racial makeup of the township was 97.74% White, 0.62% African American, 0.17% Native American, 0.21% Asian, 0.02% Pacific Islander, 0.35% from other races, and 0.90% from two or more races. Hispanic or Latino of any race were 0.92%.

Out of the 2,387 households that were documented during the census, 36.8% had children who were under the age of eighteen, 66.1% were married couples living together, 7.5% had a female householder with no husband present, and 22.6% were non-families. 18.7% of households were made up of individuals, and 7.1% were one-person households with residents who were aged sixty-five or older.

The average household size was 2.78 and the average family size was 3.19.

The age distribution was 27.8% of residents who were under the age of eighteen, 8.2% who were aged eighteen to twenty-four, 28.9% who were aged twenty-five to forty-four, 24.0% who were aged forty-five to sixty-four, and 11.1% who were aged sixty-five or older. The median age was thirty-seven years.

For every one hundred females, there were 98.8 males. For every one hundred females who were aged eighteen or older, there were 96.8 males.

The median household income was $45,018 and the median family income was $49,738. Males had a median income of $37,207 compared with that of $24,571 for females.

The per capita income for the township was $17,912.

Approximately 5.2% of families and 6.0% of the population were living below the poverty line, including 9.0% of those who were under the age of eighteen and 9.1% of those who were aged sixty-five or older.
