= Quarryville, Pennsylvania =

Borough in Pennsylvania, US

- Borough
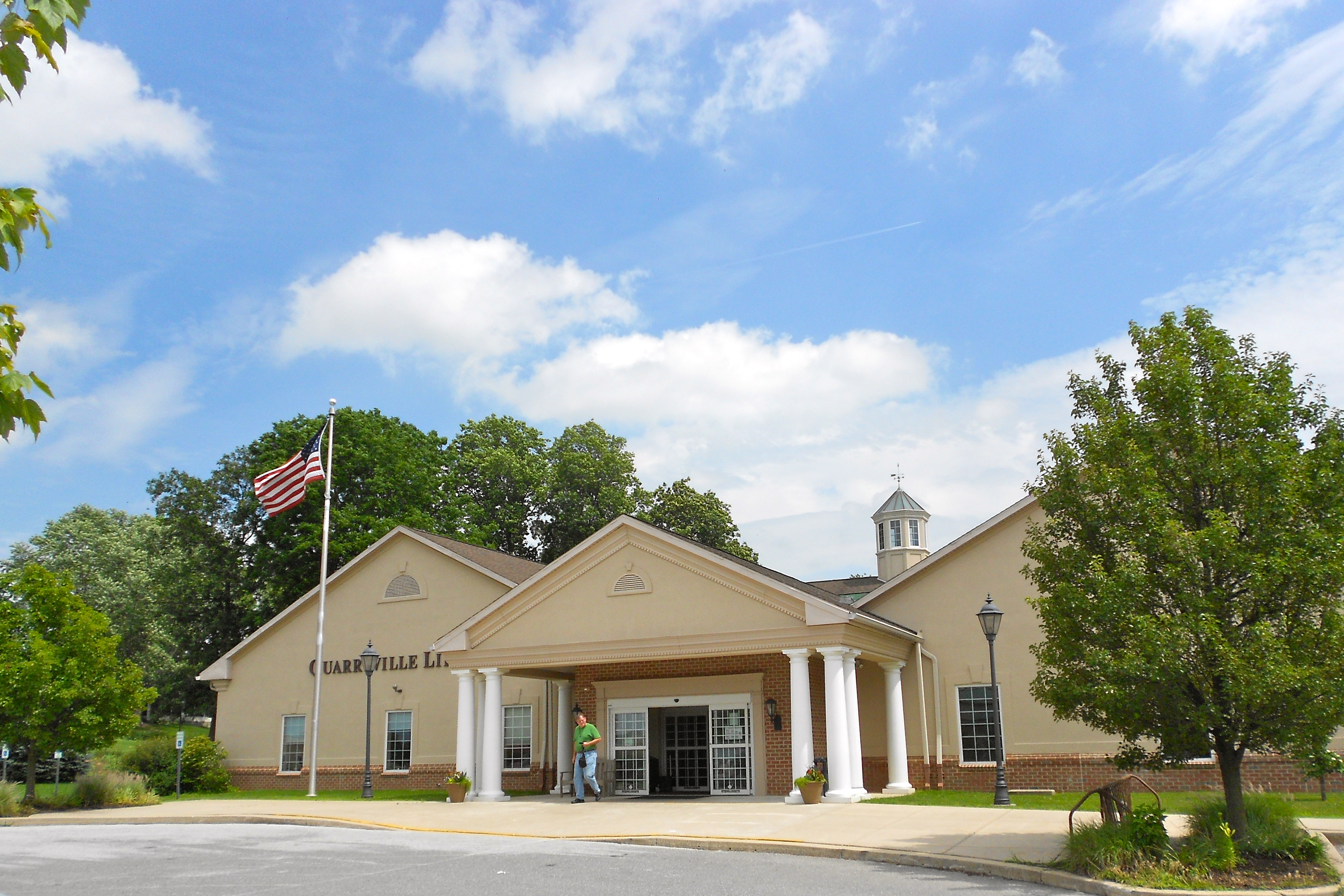
- Quarryville Library

- Logo

- Location in Lancaster County, Pennsylvania

- Location in Pennsylvania Location in the United States
- Coordinates: 39°53′43″N 76°09′44″W
- Country: United States
- State: Pennsylvania
- County: Lancaster
- Founded: 1791
- Incorporated: 1892

Area
  - Total: 1.31 sq mi (3.40 km^{2})
  - Land: 1.29 sq mi (3.34 km^{2})
  - Water: 0.019 sq mi (0.05 km^{2})
- Elevation: 545 ft (166 m)

Population (2020)
  - Total: 2,843
  - Density: 2,202/sq mi (850.1/km^{2})
- Time zone: UTC-5 (EST)
  - Summer (DST): UTC-4 (EDT)
- ZIP code: 17566
- Area codes: 717
- FIPS code: 42-63064
- Website: quarryvilleborough.com

Quarryville is a borough in Lancaster County, Pennsylvania, United States. The population was 2,852 at the 2020 census, an increase over the figure of 2,576 tabulated in 2010.

== Geography ==
Quarryville is located in southern Lancaster County. U.S. Route 222 passes through the borough, leading northwest 14 miles (23 km) to Lancaster, the county seat, and south 17 miles (27 km) to U.S. Route 1 in Conowingo, Maryland. Pennsylvania Route 372 (State Street) also passes through Quarryville, leading east 16 miles (26 km) to Parkesburg and west 11 miles (18 km) to its crossing of the Susquehanna River near Holtwood. Pennsylvania Route 472 (South Lime Street) leads southeast from Quarryville 13 miles (21 km) to Oxford.

According to the United States Census Bureau, the Borough of Quarryville has a total area of 1.3 square miles (3.4 km^{2}), of which 0.02 square miles (0.05 km^{2}), or 1.53%, are water. The borough is drained by the headwaters of the South Fork of Big Beaver Creek, a northwestward-flowing tributary of Pequea Creek, itself a tributary of the Susquehanna River.

== Demographics ==
Historical population
Census	Pop.	Note	%±
1880	346		—
1900	565		—
1910	739		30.8%
1920	823		11.4%
1930	1,028		24.9%
1940	1,120		8.9%
1950	1,187		6.0%
1960	1,427		20.2%
1970	1,571		10.1%
1980	1,558		−0.8%
1990	1,642		5.4%
2000	1,994		21.4%
2010	2,576		29.2%
2020	2,843		10.4%
2021 (est.)	2,861	▲	0.6%

As of the census of 2000, there were 1,994 people, 838 households, and 578 families residing in the borough. The population density was 1,520.9 inhabitants per square mile (587.2/km^{2}). There were 864 housing units at an average density of 659.0 per square mile (254.4/km^{2}). The racial makeup of the borough was 96.69% White, 0.45% African American, 0.10% Native American, 0.25% Asian, 1.50% from other races, and 1.00% from two or more races. Hispanic or Latino of any race were 2.26% of the population.

There were 838 households, out of which 34.0% had children under the age of 18 living with them, 53.6% were married couples living together, 12.3% had a female householder with no husband present, and 31.0% were non-families. 28.4% of all households were made up of individuals, and 13.6% had someone living alone who was 65 years of age or older. The average household size was 2.38 and the average family size was 2.92.

In the borough the population was spread out, with 27.0% under the age of 18, 7.6% from 18 to 24, 27.4% from 25 to 44, 20.0% from 45 to 64, and 18.1% who were 65 years of age or older. The median age was 37 years. For every 100 females there were 90.4 males. For every 100 females age 18 and over, there were 82.2 males.

The median income for a household in the borough was $35,798, and the median income for a family was $44,000. Males had a median income of $38,550 versus $23,989 for females. The per capita income for the borough was $19,105. About 5.9% of families and 7.1% of the population were below the poverty line, including 10.6% of those under age 18 and 5.7% of those age 65 or over.

== History ==
The land which became Quarryville Borough was originally located within Providence Township and was the property of a John ("Swamp John") Groff. There was a stone quarry adjacent to the village where many of the workers lived. This village became larger as the work force grew, hence the town acquired the name "Quarryville". Locals say that one day the men went to lunch and returned to find the quarry half-full of water. The quarry site remains, now full of water.

Every September, the community is home to the Solanco Fair, which began in 1950 and takes place on the Solanco Fairgrounds.

The final scenes in the movie The Boys from Brazil (film) take place on a farm near Quarryville.

== Education ==
Quarryville is part of the Solanco School District.

Quarryville Elementary School, Smith Middle School, and Solanco High School serve Quarryville.

== Local services ==
The Quarryville Library is part of the Lancaster County Library System. The Quarryville Fire Company is a volunteer unit.

== Notable people ==
- Edwin Duing Eshleman, former member of the United States House of Representatives
- Robert Fulton, inventor and painter; born outside of Quarryville
- William Roy Wallace, architect, born in Quarryville
- Johnny Weir, US Olympic figure skater; grew up in Quarryville
- Don Wert, played third base for the Detroit Tigers 1963–1970
