= Pennsylvania Route 372 =

State highway in Pennsylvania, US

Pennsylvania Route 372

Route information
- Maintained by PennDOT and Borough of Christiana
- Length: 34.912 mi (56.185 km)

Major junctions
- West end: PA 74 in Lower Chanceford Township
- PA 272 in Buck; US 222 in Quarryville; PA 472 in Quarryville; PA 896 in Georgetown; PA 41 in Atglen; PA 10 in Parkesburg
- East end: PA 82 in Coatesville

Location
- Country: United States
- State: Pennsylvania
- Counties: York, Lancaster, Chester

Highway system
- Pennsylvania State Route System; Interstate; US; State; Scenic; Legislative
| ← PA 371 | → PA 374 |
| ← PA 570 | PA 572 | → PA Turnpike 576 |

Pennsylvania Route 372 (PA 372) is an east–west highway in York, Lancaster, and Chester counties in the U.S. state of Pennsylvania. Its western terminus is at PA 74 in Lower Chanceford Township north of Delta and west of Holtwood, and its eastern terminus is at PA 82 in Coatesville. PA 372 heads east from PA 74 in York County and crosses the Susquehanna River on the Norman Wood Bridge. The route continues through Lancaster County, intersecting PA 272 in Buck, U.S. Route 222 (US 222) and PA 472 in Quarryville, and PA 896 in Georgetown. PA 372 crosses into Chester County and intersects PA 41 in Atglen and PA 10 in Parkesburg before continuing to Coatesville. PA 372 is a two-lane undivided road throughout its length.

In 1809, the state authorized for a road between Parkesburg and McCall's Ferry on the Susquehanna River. PA 372 was first designated in 1928 to run between McCall's Ferry and PA 41 in Christiana. PA 572 was designated from PA 372 in Christiana to PA 41 in Atglen. Another section of PA 572 was designated between PA 42 (now PA 10) in Parkesburg and PA 82 in Coatesville by 1930; these two sections were linked in 1937. In the 1940s, PA 372 was rerouted to its current eastern terminus, replacing PA 572. PA 372 was realigned to its current western terminus in 1968 following the completion of the Norman Wood Bridge. The PA 272 intersection was relocated in 2007 in order to improve safety.

== Route description ==
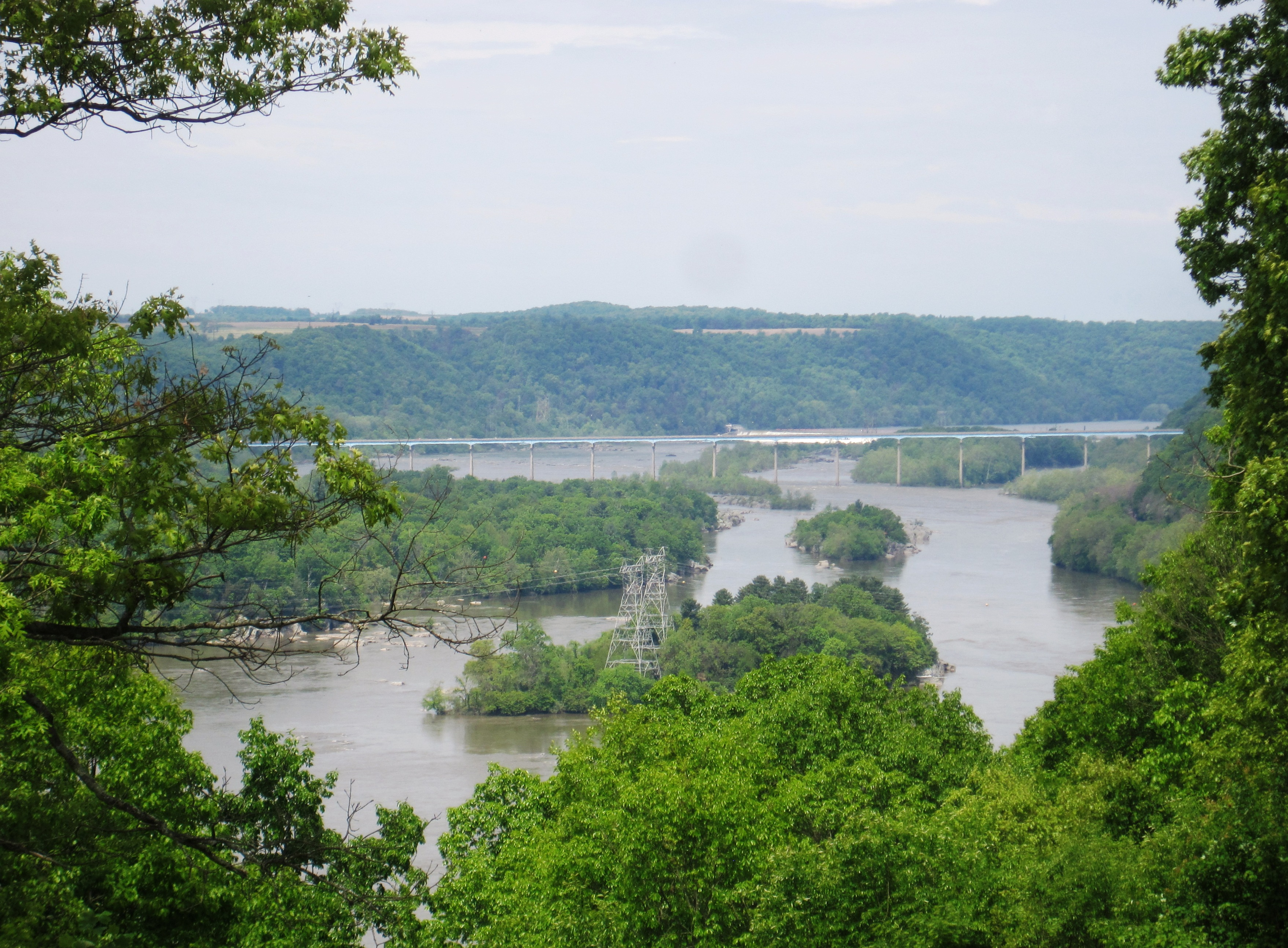
PA 372 crossing the Susquehanna River on the Norman Wood Bridge

PA 372 begins at an intersection with PA 74 in Lower Chanceford Township, York County, heading northeast as two-lane undivided Holtwood Road. The route heads through wooded areas with some farmland and comes to the Norman Wood Bridge over the Susquehanna River, located to the south of Holtwood Dam. Upon crossing the river, PA 372 enters Martic Township in Lancaster County and passes over Norfolk Southern's Port Road Branch railroad line as it continues into forested areas. The road turns north as it passes to the west of the Muddy Run Pumped Storage Facility and to the east of the community of Holtwood. The route curves northeast into a mix of farmland and woodland with some homes near the community of Bethesda. PA 372 crosses Muddy Run into Drumore Township and continues through rural areas. The route reaches the community of Buck, where it comes to an intersection with PA 272.

Here, PA 372 turns south from Holtwood Road and curves east to PA 272. Eastbound PA 372 turns north for a short concurrency with PA 272 on Lancaster Pike before turning east on Buck Road while westbound PA 372 follows Friendly Drive south and west from Buck Road to PA 272. Upon crossing PA 272, PA 372 enters East Drumore Township and continues northeast along Buck Road through agricultural areas with some woods and residences, passing through the community of Oakbottom. The route makes a sharp turn northwest before immediately turning northeast again before it enters the borough of Quarryville.

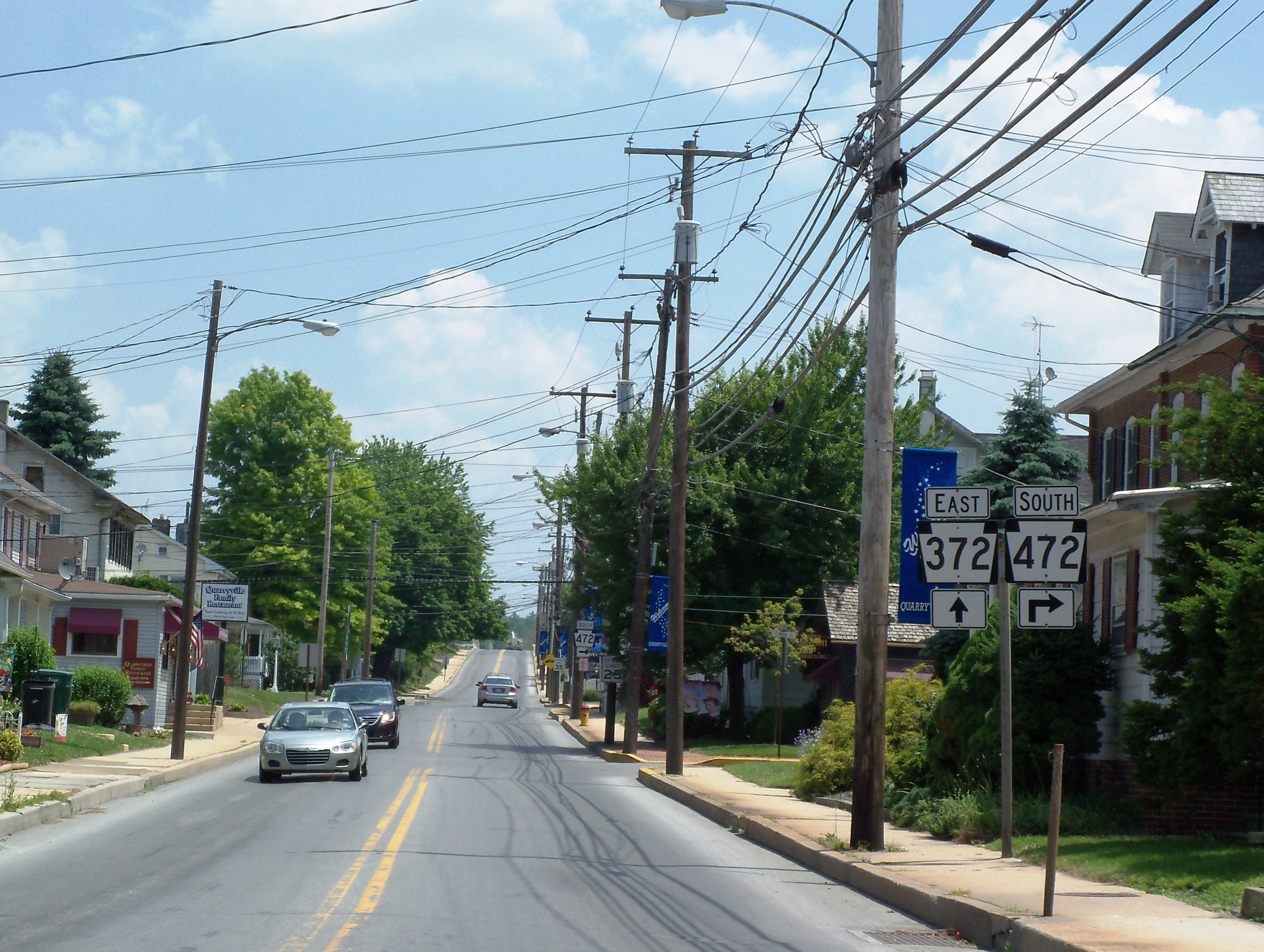
PA 372 eastbound at PA 472 in Quarryville

Here, the name of the road becomes West State Street and it passes homes, reaching a junction with US 222. At this point, US 222 becomes concurrent with PA 372 and the road is lined with more residences. In the center of Quarryville, US 222 turns to the south and PA 372 continues along East State Street through the commercial downtown. The route passes homes and businesses in the eastern part of Quarryville and intersects the northern terminus of PA 472. The road comes to a bridge over the Enola Low Grade Trail and leaves Quarryville for Eden Township, where the name changes to Valley Road. At this point, the route enters the Pennsylvania Dutch Country of eastern Lancaster County, which is home to many Amish farms. PA 372 heads east-northeast through farmland with some wooded areas and homes. The route continues into Bart Township and passes through more rural land before it reaches an intersection with PA 896 in the community of Green Tree. At this point, PA 372 turns north onto PA 896 and the two routes run concurrent through a mix of farms and homes along Georgetown Road.

PA 372 splits from PA 896 by heading east on Christiana Pike, at which point PA 896 turns west towards the community of Georgetown. PA 372 continues east through farmland and crosses into Sadsbury Township, where it passes through the community of Smyrna. The road heads into wooded areas with some homes as it enters the borough of Christiana. Here, the route bypasses the center of Christiana to the south along borough-maintained Germantown Avenue. PA 372 turns southeast onto state-maintained South Bridge Street and runs through woodland with some development on the west bank of the East Branch Octoraro Creek.

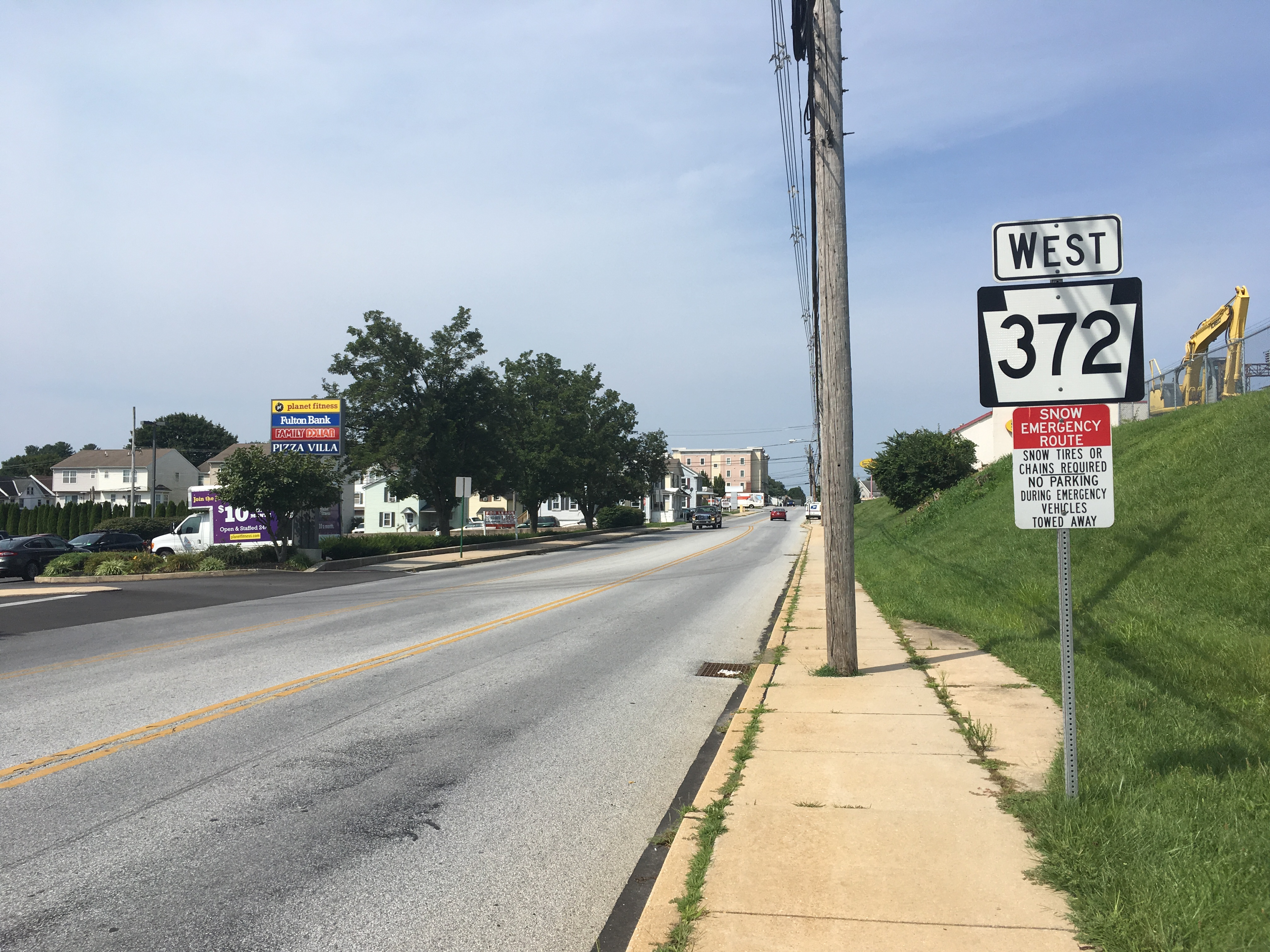
PA 372 westbound past PA 10 in Parkesburg

The route turns east and crosses the East Branch Octoraro Creek into West Sadsbury Township in Chester County, heading southeast along Valley Avenue. The road curves south and passes under the Enola Low Grade Trail before making a sharp turn to the east into the borough of Atglen. PA 372 follows Valley Avenue through residential areas before turning south onto Main Street in the commercial center of the borough. The route passes homes before it turns east onto Lower Valley Road and passes commercial establishments, reaching a junction with PA 41. A short distance past this intersection, PA 372 crosses back into West Sadsbury Township and heads through farmland with some industrial buildings and homes. The route turns north onto South Limestone Road and runs along the border between West Sadsbury Township and the borough of Parkesburg to the east before fully entering Parkesburg, passing between industrial areas to the west and residential neighborhoods to the east. PA 372 curves east and follows West First Avenue past homes, continuing into business areas further east. The route crosses PA 10 and becomes East First Avenue, passing residences.

The road leaves Parkesburg for Sadsbury Township and heads through a mix of farmland and woodland with some homes on Valley Road, crossing Buck Run. The route turns north at the Strasburg Road intersection and turns east a short distance later, passing through the residential community of Pomeroy. PA 372 enters Valley Township and runs through wooded areas with some fields and residential neighborhoods, heading through the community of Westwood and crossing under an abandoned railroad line. The road passes between homes to the north and a Cleveland-Cliffs (formerly Lukens Steel Company) steel plant to the south, becoming the border between the city of Coatesville to the north and Valley Township to the south before fully entering Coatesville. PA 372 reaches its eastern terminus at an intersection with PA 82.

== History ==
Pennsylvania Route 572
- Location: Christiana – Coatesville
- Existed: 1928–1940s

In 1809, the Pennsylvania General Assembly authorized for a road between Parkesburg and McCall's Ferry on the Susquehanna River. This road, which ran through the Great Valley, became known as Valley Road or McCall's Ferry Road. When Pennsylvania first legislated routes in 1911, what is now PA 372 existed as a paved road between Quarryville and Georgetown while the remainder of the route west of Quarryville and from Georgetown and Christiana was unpaved. The route was not designated as part of a legislative route. By 1926, the road was paved between Georgetown and Christiana.

PA 372 was designated in 1928 to run from McCall's Ferry, where a ferry crossed the Susquehanna River to York County and connected to an unpaved road leading to PA 74 in Kyleville, east to PA 41 (Newport Avenue) in Christiana. The route followed Pinnacle Road and Holtwood Road to Holtwood, its current alignment between Holtwood and Christiana, and Water Street, Bridge Street, and Sadsbury Avenue through Christiana. At this time, the entire length of PA 372 was paved. PA 572 was designated to run from PA 372 in Christiana to PA 41 in Atglen on an unpaved road, following Bridge Street and Valley Avenue. At this time, the current alignment east of Atglen was unnumbered and was paved between Parkesburg and Coatesville. By 1930, a separate section of PA 572 was designated onto the paved road between PA 42 (now PA 10) in Parkesburg and PA 82 in Coatesville. In 1937, the road between Atglen and Parkesburg was paved and became a part of PA 572, resulting in a continuous route from PA 372 in Christiana to PA 82 in Coatesville.

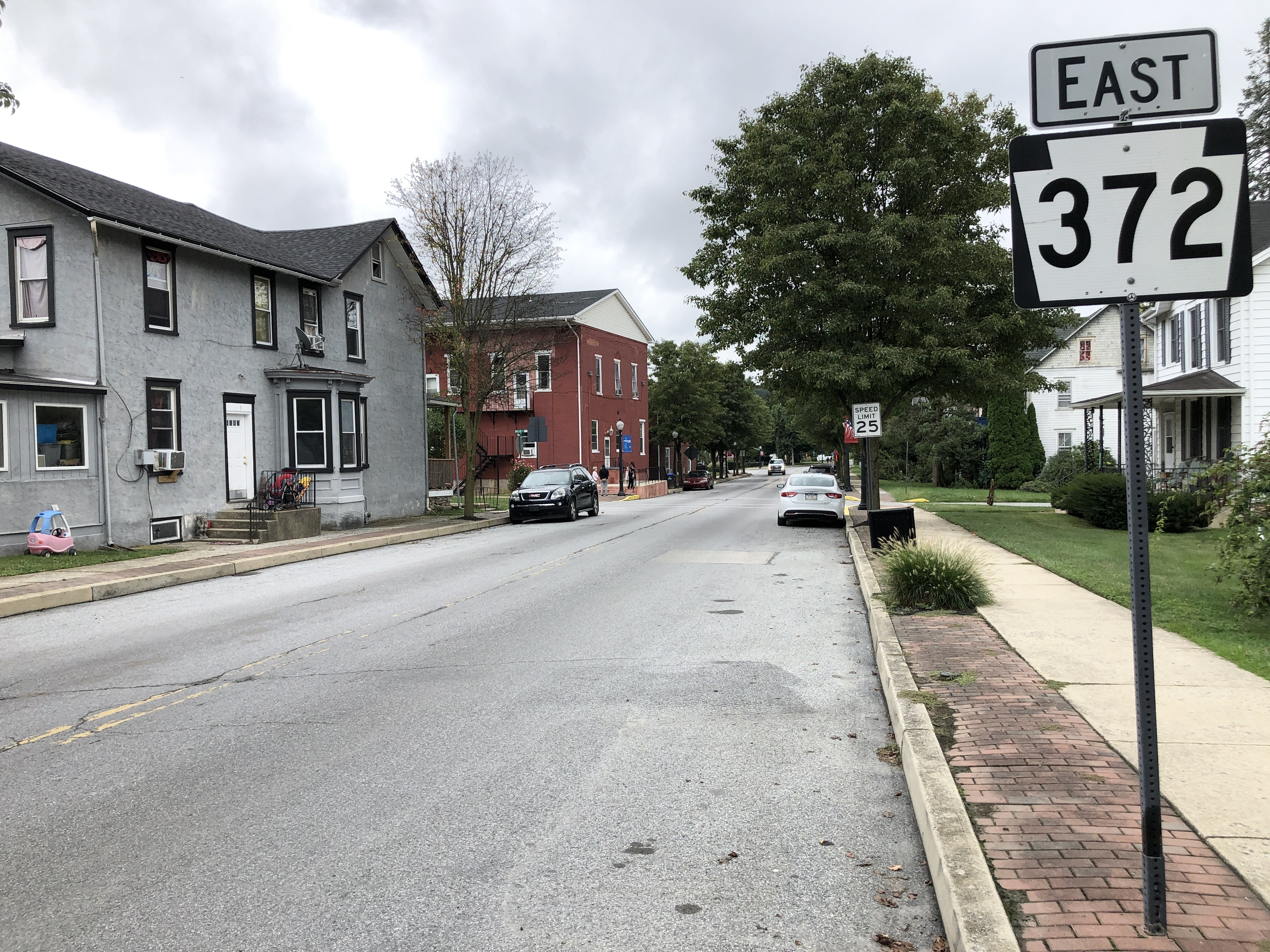
PA 372 east through the borough of Atglen

PA 372 was rerouted to its current eastern terminus at PA 82 in Coatesville in the 1940s, replacing the PA 572 designation between Christiana and Coatesville. On August 21, 1968, the Norman Wood Bridge over the Susquehanna River was opened, and PA 372 was rerouted at Bethesda to head over the bridge to its current western terminus at PA 74. Prior to 2007, the intersection of PA 372 and PA 272 in Buck was considered by the Intelligencer Journal to be one of the deadliest intersections in Lancaster County due to the number of fatal accidents that occurred there. In 2007, the highways' intersection was moved to a new signalized intersection just south of the original stop-controlled intersection. The project also involved widening existing roads to accommodate the new intersection and allowing only right turns at the original intersection.

On September 28, 2015, the Norman Wood Bridge that carries PA 372 over the Susquehanna River was closed indefinitely after a crack was discovered in one of the steel girders. The bridge reopened with one lane of traffic on October 16, 2015 and all restrictions were removed on November 2, 2015.

== Major intersections ==
| County | Location | mi | km | Destinations | Notes |
|---|---|---|---|---|---|
| York | Lower Chanceford Township | 0.000 | 0.000 | PA 74 (Delta Road) – Maryland, Red Lion | Western terminus |
| Susquehanna River | | 2.349 | 3.780 | Norman Wood Bridge | |
| Lancaster | Drumore–East Drumore township line | 9.637 | 15.509 | PA 272 south (Lancaster Pike) | West end of PA 272 concurrency eastbound |
| Lancaster | Drumore–East Drumore township line | 9.877 | 15.895 | PA 272 north (Lancaster Pike) | East end of PA 272 concurrency eastbound |
| Lancaster | Quarryville | 13.494 | 21.716 | US 222 north (West Fourth Street) – Lancaster | West end of US 222 concurrency |
| Lancaster | Quarryville | 13.947 | 22.446 | US 222 south (South Church Street) – Maryland | East end of US 222 concurrency |
| Lancaster | Quarryville | 14.197 | 22.848 | PA 472 south (South Lime Street) | Northern terminus of PA 472 |
| Lancaster | Bart Township | 19.409 | 31.236 | PA 896 south (Georgetown Road) – Nine Points | West end of PA 896 concurrency |
| Lancaster | Bart Township | 20.429 | 32.877 | PA 896 north (Georgetown Road) – Strasburg, Lancaster | East end of PA 896 concurrency |
| Chester | Atglen | 26.758 | 43.063 | PA 41 (Gap Newport Pike) – Gap, Cochranville | |
| Chester | Parkesburg | 30.068 | 48.390 | PA 10 (Church Street) – Honey Brook, Cochranville | |
| Chester | Coatesville | 34.912 | 56.185 | PA 82 (Strode Avenue) | Eastern terminus |
1.000 mi = 1.609 km; 1.000 km = 0.621 mi: Concurrency terminus
