= Eichelberger's Covered Bridge =

Eichelberger's Covered Bridge may refer to:

- Buck Hill Farm Covered Bridge, a covered bridge on private property that spans a farm pond inlet in Lancaster County, Pennsylvania
- Jackson's Sawmill Covered Bridge, a covered bridge that spans the West Branch of the Octoraro Creek in Lancaster County, Pennsylvania
