= Georgetown, Pennsylvania =

Georgetown, Pennsylvania may refer to:

- Georgetown, Beaver County, Pennsylvania
- Georgetown, Lancaster County, Pennsylvania
- Georgetown, Luzerne County, Pennsylvania
