= MQS =

MQS may refer to:

- Mustique Airport, IATA code MQS
- Chester County G. O. Carlson Airport, FAA location identifier MQS
