= Esther Ann Reeser =

American baseball player (1928–2014)

Esther Ann Hershey
- Outfielder
- Born: January 5, 1928; Nine Points, Pennsylvania, U.S.
- Died: January 14, 2014 (aged 86); Honey Brook, Pennsylvania, U.S.
- Batted: Right Threw: Right

Teams
- Springfield Sallies (1948)

Career highlights and awards
- Women in Baseball – AAGPBL Permanent Display at the Baseball Hall of Fame and Museum (since 1988)

Esther Ann Hershey [Reeser] (January 5, 1928 – January 14, 2014) was an American outfielder who played briefly for the Springfield Sallies of the All-American Girls Professional Baseball League (AAGPBL) in 1948. Esther Ann played under her maiden name, and she was nicknamed Zan.

She was born in Nine Points, Pennsylvania and died in Honey Brook, Pennsylvania.
