= Passtown Elementary School =

- U.S. National Register of Historic Places
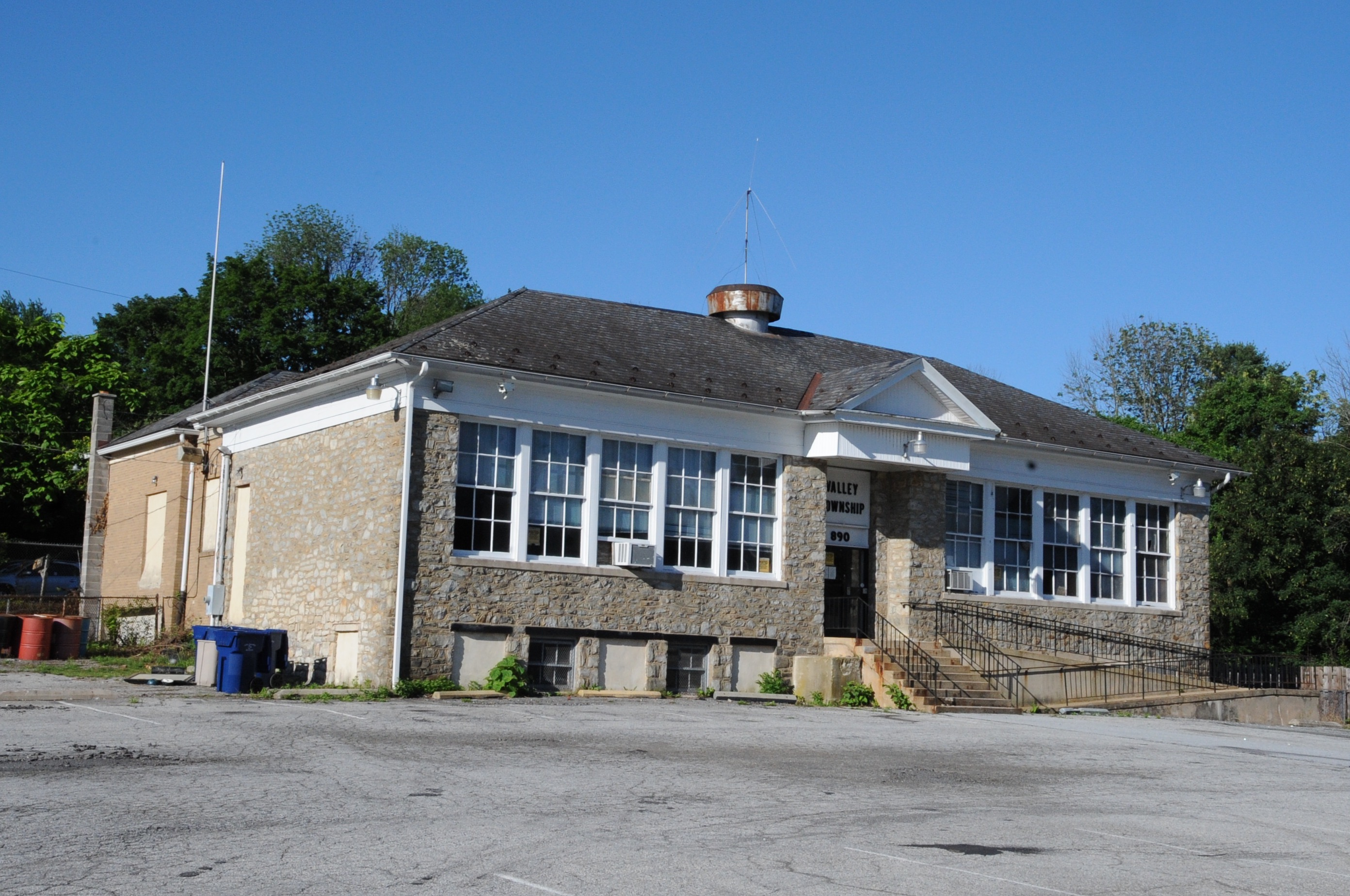
- Passtown Elementary School in 2022

- Location within Pennsylvania Location within the United States
- Location: 890 West Lincoln Hwy., Valley Township, Pennsylvania, US
- Coordinates: 39°59′02″N 75°50′45″W
- Built: 1923
- Architectural style: Colonial Revival
- NRHP reference No.: 100007787
- Added to NRHP: June 13, 2022

Passtown Elementary School is a historic American school building in Valley Township, Chester County, Pennsylvania. Built in 1923 and expanded in 1950, this racially segregated school anchored the mostly African American Hayti neighborhood, just west of the city of Coatesville. Passtown was listed on the National Register of Historic Places on June 13, 2022.

== Description and history ==
Passtown Elementary School, also called Pass School, was constructed as a two-room schoolhouse in 1923 and expanded to four rooms in 1950. It replaced a one-room schoolhouse across the street that was built in 1914. The school served elementary and middle-schoolers from the African American community that grew up in the Hayti neighborhood, just west of the industrial city of Coatesville, in the years following the American Civil War. Together with the First Baptist Church of Passtown nearby, the school was an anchor for the local Black community. After the U.S. Supreme Court ruled school segregation unconstitutional in the Brown v. Board of Education decision of 1954, Passtown Elementary School was racially desegregated in 1957.

Passtown was a school into the 1960s. At various times, the building hosted dances and festivals and served as a community center, polling site, childcare location, and temporary church. After its educational purposes ceased, the building functioned as municipal offices for 30 years. As of 2020, the town planned to vacate the building soon, and its fate was unclear. Backed by the Pennsylvania state preservation office, the Hayti Historical Society has spearheaded efforts to preserve the school.

According to its National Register of Historic Places nomination, Passtown Elementary School is historically significant as an African American schoolhouse and one of Chester County's few formerly segregated schoolhouses still in existence.

== See also ==
- National Register of Historic Places listings in northern Chester County, Pennsylvania
