= Valley Township, Chester County, Pennsylvania =

Township in Pennsylvania, US

Valley Township
- Township
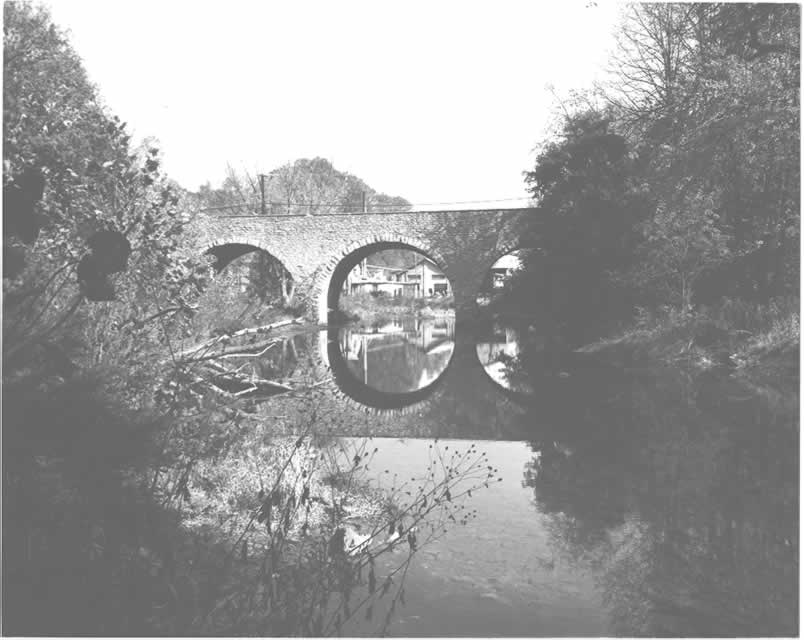
- County Bridge No. 101 in Valley Township

- Location in Chester County and the U.S. state of Pennsylvania.
- Coordinates: 39°58′48″N 75°51′09″W
- Country: United States
- State: Pennsylvania
- County: Chester

Area
  - Total: 5.97 sq mi (15.46 km^{2})
  - Land: 5.93 sq mi (15.37 km^{2})
  - Water: 0.031 sq mi (0.08 km^{2})
- Elevation: 640 ft (200 m)

Population (2010)
  - Total: 6,794
  - Estimate (2016): 7,653
  - Density: 1,289.3/sq mi (497.81/km^{2})
- Time zone: UTC-5 (EST)
  - Summer (DST): UTC-4 (EDT)
- Area code: 610
- FIPS code: 42-029-79544
- Website: www.valleytownship.org

Valley Township is a township in Chester County, Pennsylvania, United States. The population was 6,794 at the 2010 census.

== History ==
County Bridge No. 101, Hopewell Farm, and Passtown Elementary School are listed on the National Register of Historic Places.

== Geography ==
According to the U.S. Census Bureau, the township has a total area of 6.0 square miles (16 km^{2}), of which 0.17% is water. The township partially surrounds the adjacent city of Coatesville on the northern and western sides. It contains the census-designated place of Hayti and Westwood.

== Demographics ==
Historical population
Census	Pop.	Note	%±
1930	2,735		—
1940	2,663		−2.6%
1950	3,148		18.2%
1960	3,101		−1.5%
1970	3,791		22.3%
1980	3,598		−5.1%
1990	4,007		11.4%
2000	5,116		27.7%
2010	6,794		32.8%
2020	7,985		17.5%

At the 2010 census, the township was 64.3% non-Hispanic White, 23.8% Black or African American, 0.2% Native American, 1.5% Asian, and 3.8% were two or more races. 7.5% of the population were of Hispanic or Latino ancestry.

At the 2000 census there were 5,116 people, 1,874 households, and 1,362 families living in the township. The population density was 857.1 inhabitants per square mile (330.9/km^{2}). There were 1,974 housing units at an average density of 330.7 per square mile (127.7/km^{2}). The racial makeup of the township was 75.10% White, 12.30% African American, 0.90% Native American, 3.60% Asian, 5.50% from other races, and 2.40% from two or more races. Hispanic or Latino of any race were 12.50%.

There were 1,874 households, 35.6% had children under the age of 18 living with them, 55.0% were married couples living together, 12.0% had a female householder with no husband present, and 27.3% were non-families. 22.3% of households were made up of individuals, and 7.4% were one person aged 65 or older. The average household size was 2.66 and the average family size was 3.11.

The age distribution was 26.5% under the age of 18, 6.2% from 18 to 24, 34.2% from 25 to 44, 20.8% from 45 to 64, and 12.3% 65 or older. The median age was 36 years. For every 100 females, there were 95.0 males. For every 100 females age 18 and over, there were 93.1 males.

The median household income was $50,933 and the median family income was $58,712. Males had a median income of $37,451 versus $33,385 for females. The per capita income for the township was $20,648. About 3.5% of families and 5.2% of the population were below the poverty line, including 5.1% of those under age 18 and 4.2% of those age 65 or over.

== Transportation ==
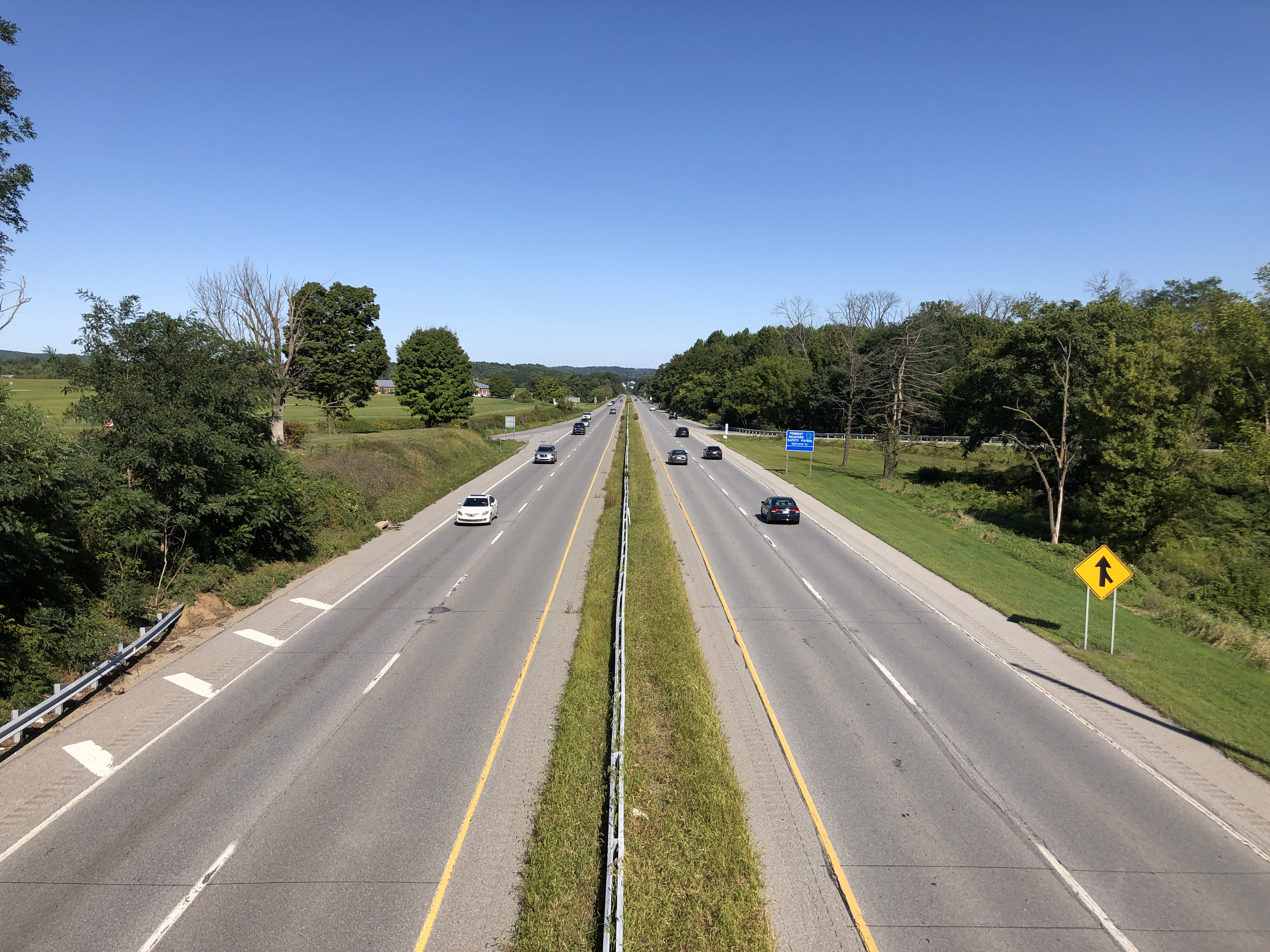
US Route 30 eastbound in Valley Township

As of 2021, there were 44.25 miles (71.21 km) of public roads in Valley Township, of which 10.69 miles (17.20 km) were maintained by the Pennsylvania Department of Transportation (PennDOT) and 33.56 miles (54.01 km) were maintained by the township.

U.S. Route 30 is the most prominent highway serving Valley Township. It follows the Coatesville-Downington Bypass along a southwest–northeast alignment across the northwestern portion of the township. U.S. Route 30 Business follows the old alignment of US 30 along Lincoln Highway through the middle of the township. Pennsylvania Route 82 follows Strode Avenue and First Avenue on a north–south alignment through eastern portions of the township. Pennsylvania Route 340 follows Kings Highway along an east–west alignment along the northeastern edge of the township. Finally, Pennsylvania Route 372 follows Valley Road along a southwest–northeast alignment across the southern portion of the township.

A general aviation airport, Chester County G. O. Carlson Airport, which allows private and corporate aircraft to easily access the town, is located in Valley Township. The airport is located about 2 miles (3 km) west of the center of the nearest major town, Coatesville.
