= Bartville, Pennsylvania =

Unincorporated community in Pennsylvania, US

- Unincorporated community
- Location within Pennsylvania Location within the United States
- Coordinates: 39°53′28″N 76°04′06″W
- Country: United States
- State: Pennsylvania
- County: Lancaster
- Township: Bart
- Elevation: 682 ft (208 m)
- Time zone: UTC-5 (Eastern (EST))
  - Summer (DST): UTC-4 (EDT)
- Area code: 717
- GNIS feature ID: 1203028

Bartville is an unincorporated community in Lancaster County, Pennsylvania, United States. It operated a post office during the 1870s and 1880s.

== Sources ==
- Platt, Franklin and Platt, William. (1877). Report of Progress in the Cambria and Somerset district of the bituminous coalfields of western Pennsylvania. Part 2. Somerset County. Harrisburg, PA
- Pennsylvania Geological Survey, 2nd series, HHH, xxiv, 348 p. illus. atlas, scale 1 in=2 mi.
- Gap Survey 1876: Mineral resources, railroads, locales, people, schools and churches.
