= Westwood, Chester County, Pennsylvania =

Unincorporated community in Pennsylvania, US

Westwood, Pennsylvania
- Census-designated place
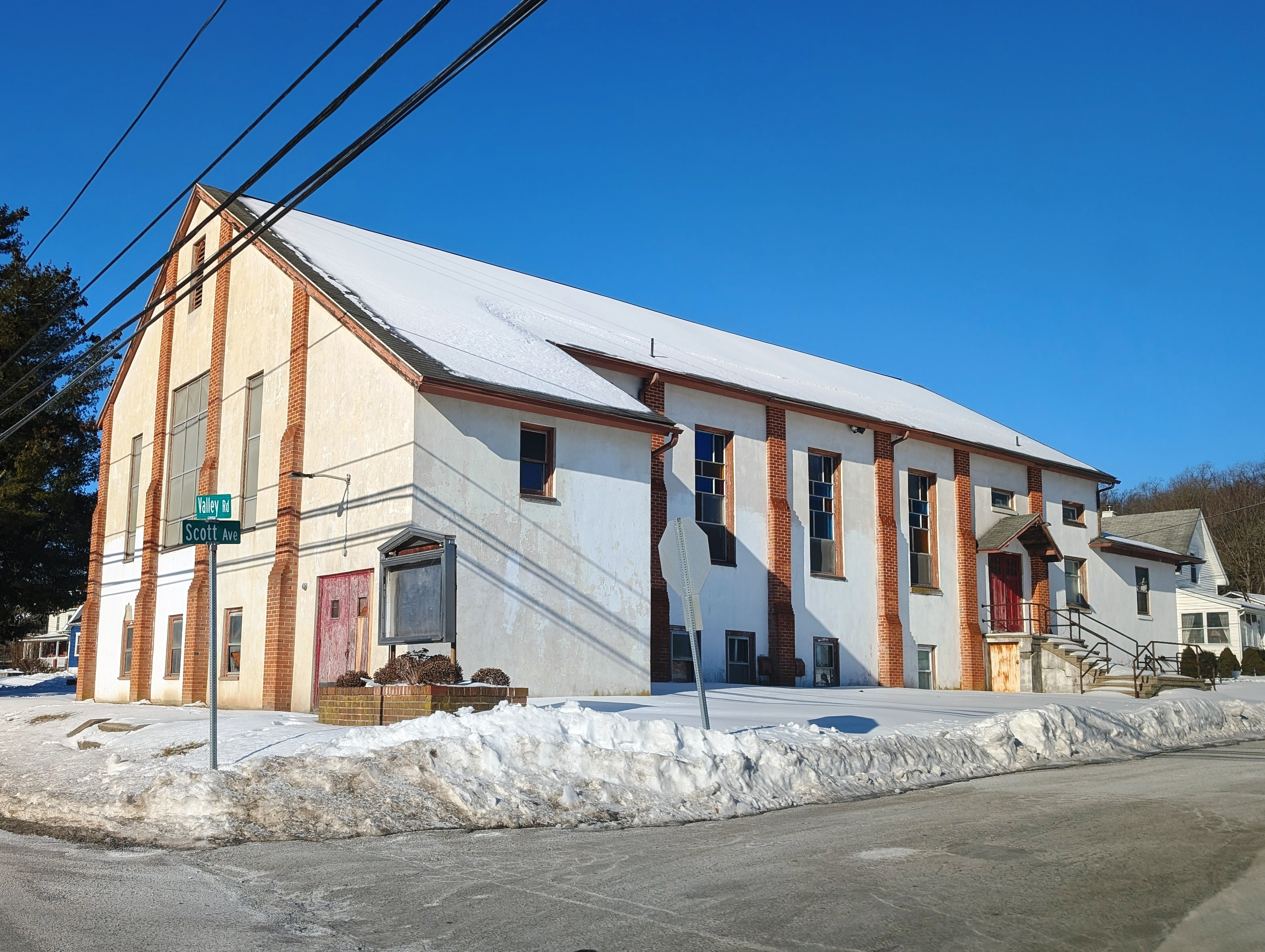
- Victory Way of the Cross Community Church

- Location in Chester County and the state of Pennsylvania.
- Coordinates: 39°58′17″N 75°51′12″W
- Country: United States
- State: Pennsylvania
- County: Chester
- Township: Valley

Area
  - Total: 0.46 sq mi (1.2 km^{2})
  - Land: 0.46 sq mi (1.2 km^{2})
  - Water: 0 sq mi (0.0 km^{2})
- Elevation: 360 ft (110 m)

Population (2010)
  - Total: 950
  - Density: 2,100/sq mi (790/km^{2})
- Time zone: UTC-5 (Eastern (EST))
  - Summer (DST): UTC-4 (EDT)
- ZIP Code: 19320 (Coatesville)
- Area code: 610
- FIPS code: 42-84248
- GNIS feature ID: 1191185

Westwood is a census-designated place (CDP) in Valley Township, Chester County, Pennsylvania, United States. The population was 950 at the 2010 census.

== Geography ==
Westwood is located at 39°57′51″N 75°53′11″W, immediately west of the city of Coatesville. Valley Road (Pennsylvania Route 372) passes through the center of the village, connecting Coatesville with Pomeroy and Parkesburg to the west. According to the U.S. Census Bureau, Westwood has a total area of 0.46 square miles (1.2 km^{2}), all land.

== Education ==
The school district is Coatesville Area School District.
