= Bethesda, Pennsylvania =

Unincorporated community in Pennsylvania, US

Coordinates: 39°50′45″N 76°18′14″W

Bethesda is an unincorporated community in Lancaster County, Pennsylvania. It is situated at the junction between Township Road 432 and Lancaster County, in Pennsylvania. It is situated at the junction between T-432 (Hilldale Road) and Pennsylvania Route 372.

== History ==
A post office called Bethesda was established in 1857, and remained in operation until it was discontinued in 1904. The community was named after the Pool of Bethesda, a place mentioned in the Bible.
