= County Bridge No. 101 =

- U.S. National Register of Historic Places
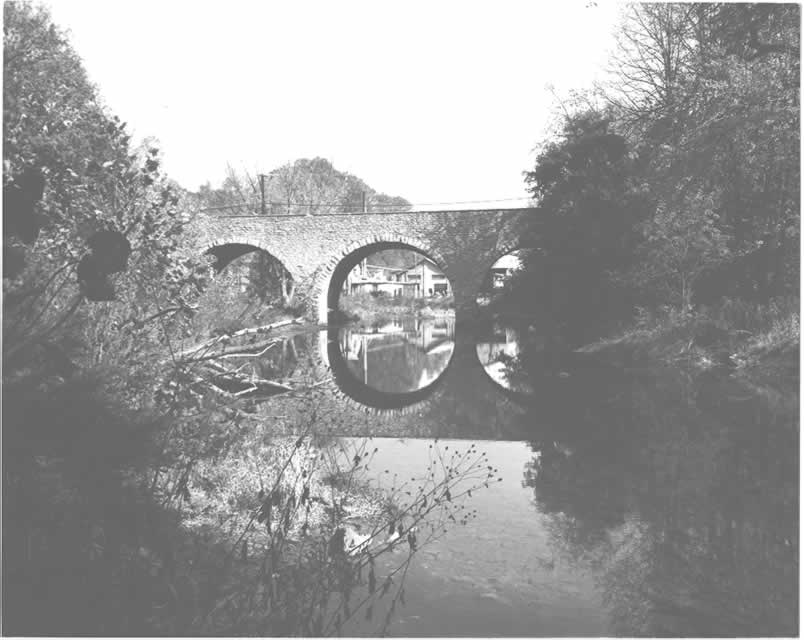
- County Bridge No. 101, 1982

- Location within Pennsylvania Location within the United States
- Location: Wagontown Road over Brandywine Creek, near Rock Run, Valley Township, Pennsylvania
- Coordinates: 39°59′29″N 75°49′52″W
- Area: less than one acre
- Built: 1918
- Built by: Corcorn Construction Co.
- Architectural style: Stilted arch
- MPS: Highway Bridges Owned by the Commonwealth of Pennsylvania, Department of Transportation TR
- NRHP reference No.: 88000780
- Added to NRHP: June 22, 1988

County Bridge No. 101 is a historic stone arch bridge located in Valley Township, Chester County, Pennsylvania. It spans Brandywine Creek. It has four stilted arch spans, each of which are 40-feet long. The bridge was constructed in 1918.

It was listed on the National Register of Historic Places in 1988.
