= Georgetown, Lancaster County, Pennsylvania =

Unincorporated community in Pennsylvania, US

Georgetown, Pennsylvania
- Census-designated place
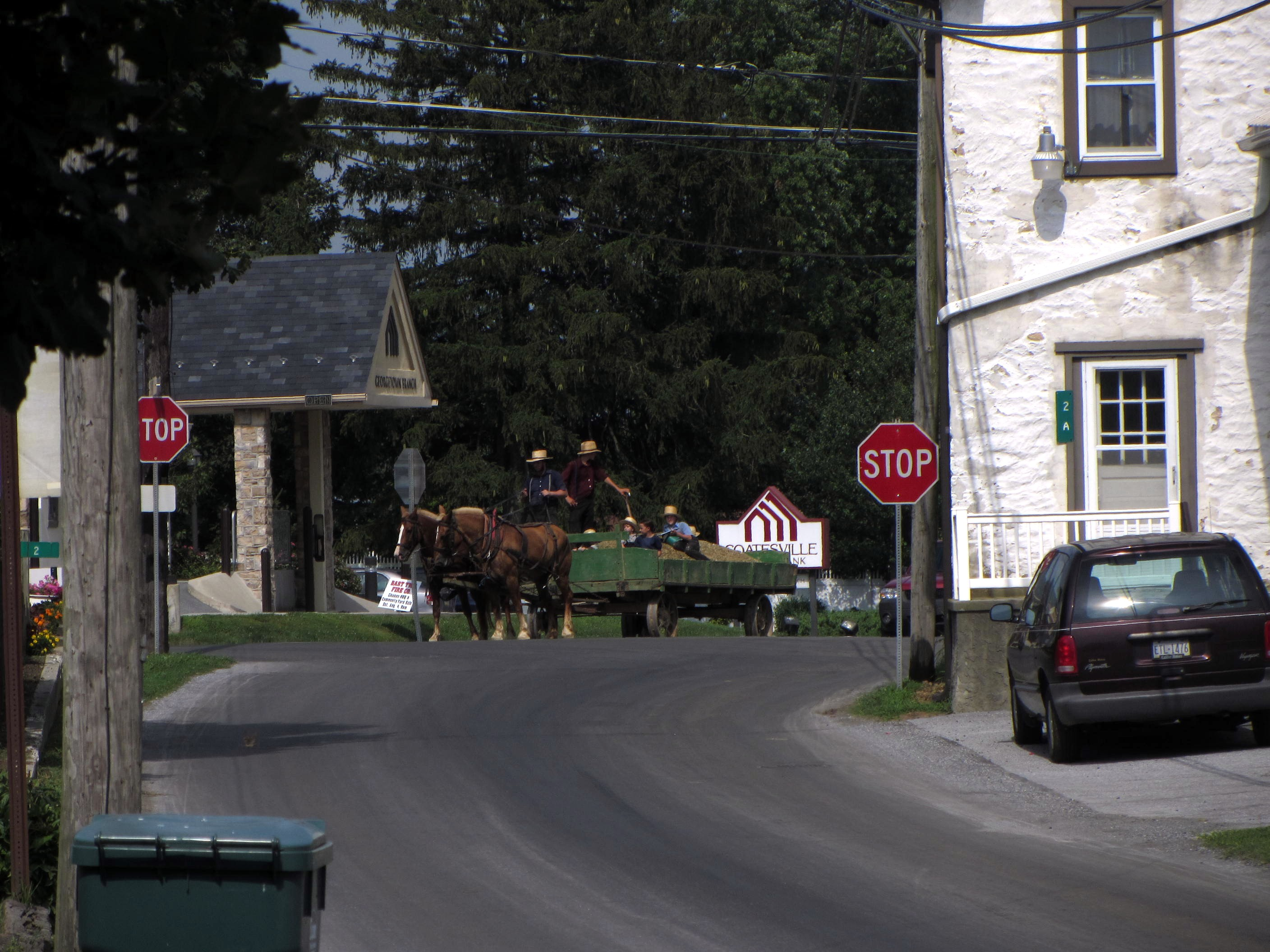

- Location in Pennsylvania Location in the United States
- Coordinates: 39°56′15″N 76°05′00″W
- Country: United States
- State: Pennsylvania
- County: Lancaster
- Township: Bart

Area
  - Total: 4.08 sq mi (10.57 km^{2})
  - Land: 4.07 sq mi (10.55 km^{2})
  - Water: 0.0077 sq mi (0.02 km^{2})
- Elevation: 678 ft (207 m)

Population (2020)
  - Total: 1,058
  - Density: 259.6/sq mi (100.25/km^{2})
- Time zone: UTC-5 (Eastern (EST))
  - Summer (DST): UTC-4 (EDT)
- ZIP codes: 17503 (Bart); 17509 (Christiana); 17562 (Paradise); 17566 (Quarryville)
- Area code: 717
- FIPS code: 42-28828
- GNIS feature ID: 1175542

Georgetown is an unincorporated community and census-designated place (CDP) in Bart Township, Pennsylvania, United States. As of the 2010 census, the population was 1,022. Georgetown has a post office for P.O. boxes that is called Bart and has the ZIP code of 17503. Otherwise, the CDP is divided into three ZIP code areas for more distant communities.

Half of the small community of Nickel Mines, the site of the West Nickel Mines School shooting, is within the Georgetown CDP. The alleged shooter, Charles Carl Roberts IV, was a resident of Georgetown, where he lived with his wife and children.

== Geography ==
Georgetown is located in southern Lancaster County in northern Bart Township, an area with a large concentration of Amish residents. It is about 52 miles (84 km) west of Philadelphia. The main roads running through the village are Georgetown Road (Pennsylvania Route 896) and the Christiana Pike (PA Route 372). Route 896 leads northwest 7 miles (11 km) to Strasburg and southeast 26 miles (42 km) to Newark, Delaware, while Route 372 leads east 5 miles (8 km) to Christiana and southwest 6 miles (10 km) to Quarryville.

According to the U.S. Census Bureau, the Georgetown CDP has a total area of 4.1 square miles (10.6 km^{2}), of which 0.01 square miles (0.02 km^{2}), or 0.17%, are water. The village of Nickel Mines is along the northern border of the CDP, and the village of Green Tree is on the southern border. Nickel Mines Run, a headwaters of the West Branch of Octoraro Creek, flows southward through the eastern part of the CDP. The entire community, via Octoraro Creek, is part of the Susquehanna River watershed.

== Demographics ==
Historical population
Census	Pop.	Note	%±
2020	1,058		—
U.S. Decennial Census
