= Norman Wood Bridge =

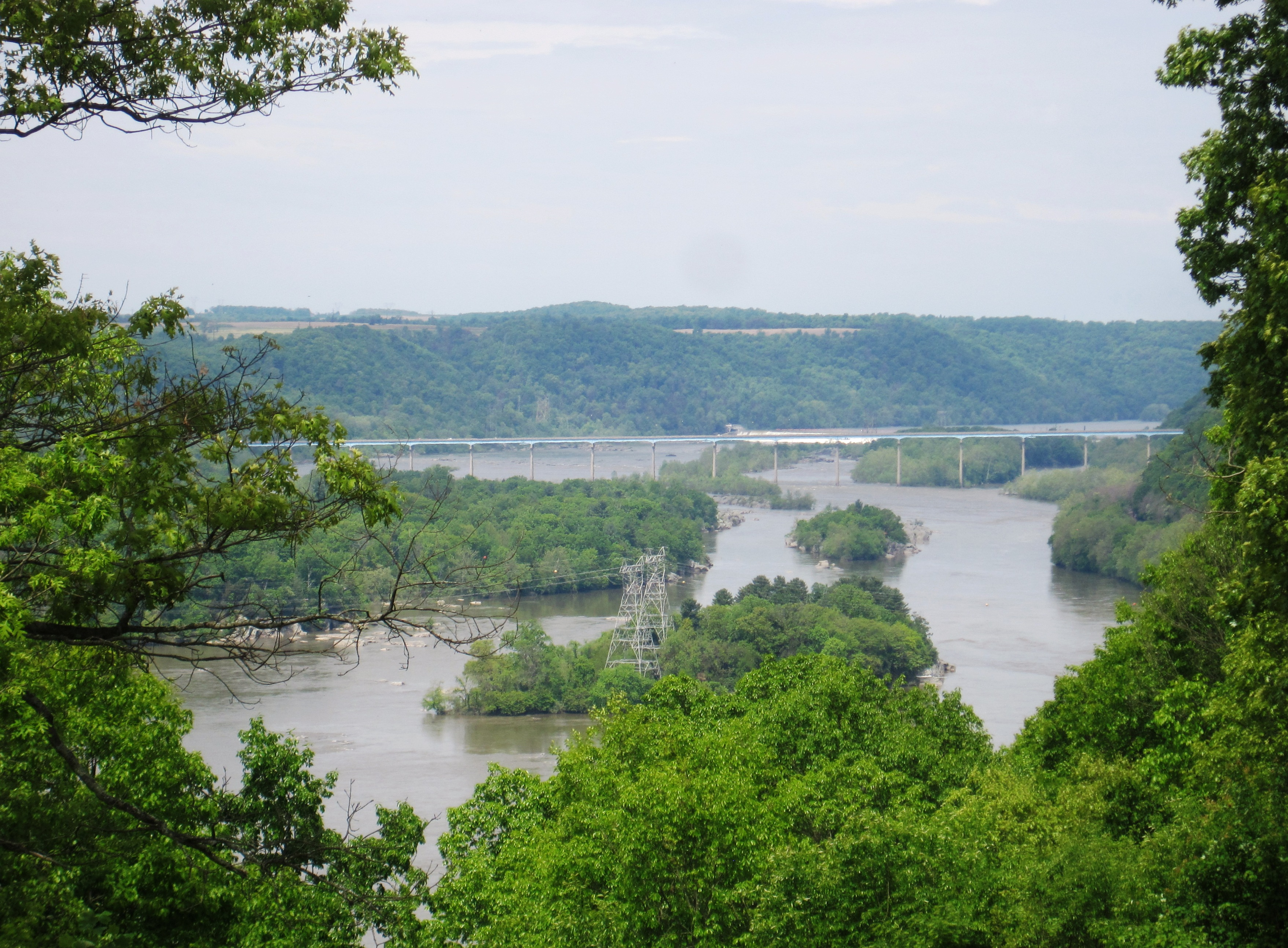
- Norman Wood Bridge in May 2023
- Coordinates: 39°49′03″N 76°19′24″W
- Carries: PA 372
- Crosses: Susquehanna River
- Locale: York County, Pennsylvania and Lancaster County, Pennsylvania

Location
- Interactive map of Norman Wood Bridge

The Norman Wood Bridge carries Pennsylvania Route 372 across the Susquehanna River between York County, Pennsylvania and Lancaster County, Pennsylvania.

== History and architectural features ==
Construction of this bridge took two years. It opened for use on August 21, 1968. Its namesake served more than 40 years in the Pennsylvania House of Representatives.

On September 28, 2015, the bridge was closed abruptly because an inspector found a crack in one of the steel girders; it reopened with one lane of traffic on October 16, 2015, and all restrictions were removed on November 2, 2015.

== Gallery ==
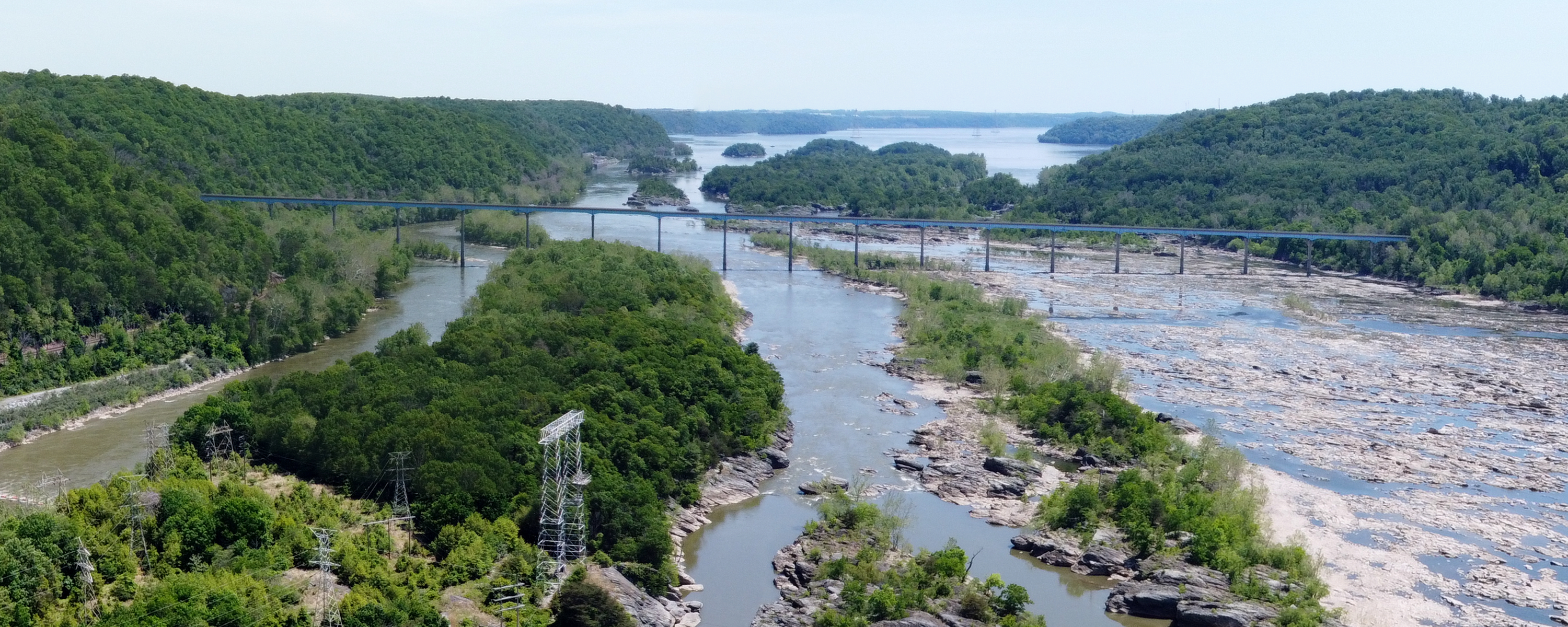
Norman Wood Bridge on the Susquehanna River
