= Chester County G. O. Carlson Airport =

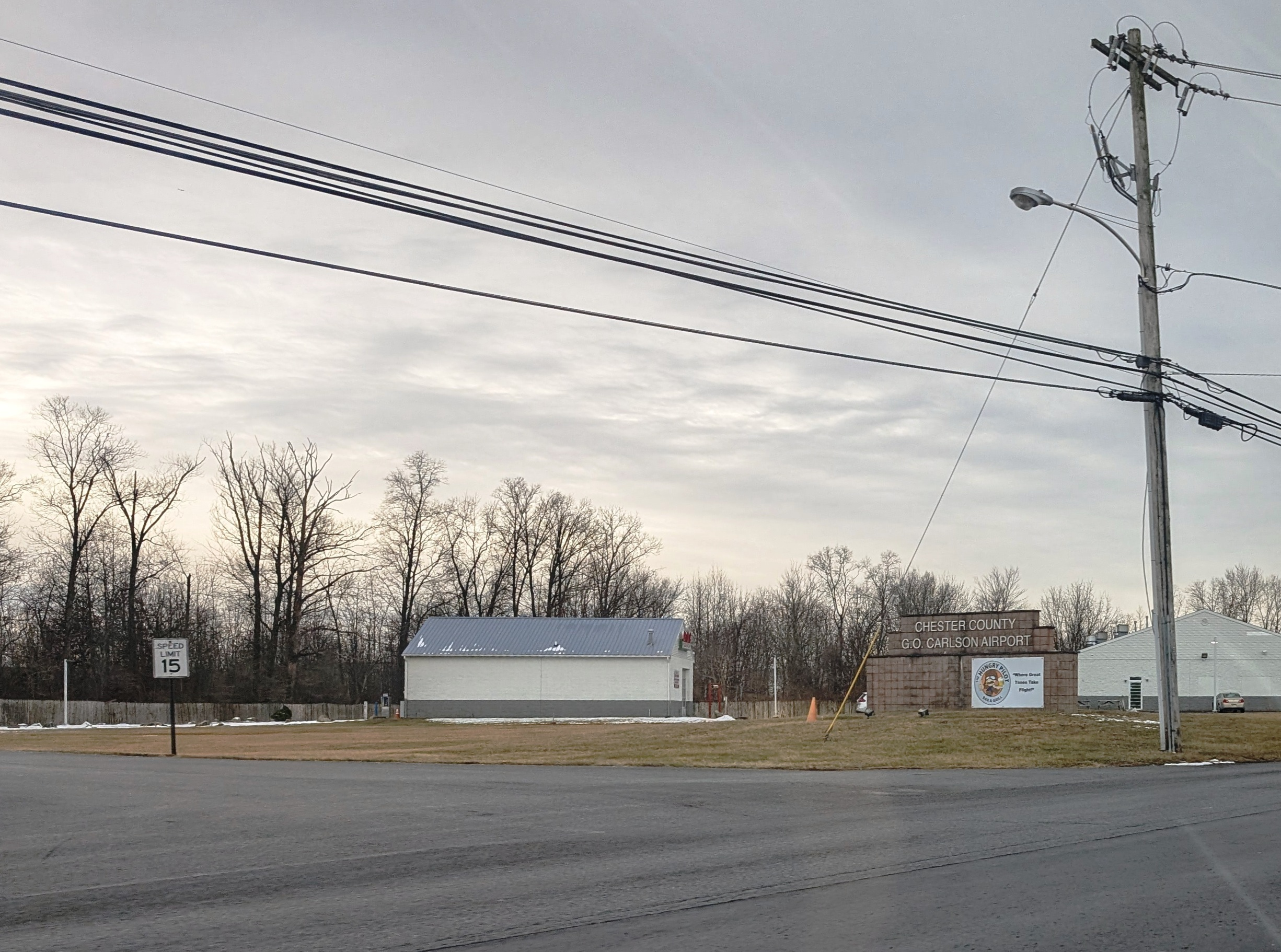
- Airport's main entrance
- IATA: CTH; ICAO: KMQS; FAA LID: MQS

Summary
- Airport type: Public
- Owner: Chester County Area Airport Authority
- Serves: Coatesville, Pennsylvania, U.S.
- Location: Valley Township, Pennsylvania, U.S.
- Elevation AMSL: 660 ft (200 m)
- Coordinates: 39°58′44″N 075°51′56″W
- Website: www.chestercountyairport.com

Map
- Location of airport in Pennsylvania MQS (the United States)

Runways
Direction	Length		Surface
Direction	ft	m	Surface
11/29	5,400	1,646	Asphalt

Statistics (2022)
- Aircraft operations (year ending 12/12/2022): 42,274
- Based aircraft: 77
- Source: Federal Aviation Administration

Chester County G. O. Carlson Airport (IATA: CTH, ICAO: KMQS, FAA LID: MQS) is a public airport 2 miles (3.2 km) west of Coatesville, in Valley Township, Chester County, Pennsylvania, United States. It is owned by the Chester County Area Airport Authority.

Chester County's airport identifier was 40N but the identifier has recently changed to MQS. The airport is next to Keystone Heliport (closed). Signature Flight Support, a fixed-base operator, and flight training offered by Chester County Aviation are also located on the field.

Most U.S. airports use the same three-letter location identifier for the FAA and IATA, but Chester County Airport is MQS to the FAA and CTH to the IATA, which was assigned MQS to Mustique Airport on Mustique in Saint Vincent and the Grenadines.

== History ==
The airport opened May 1, 1928, as Coatesville Airport, and it was owned and operated by the City of Coatesville. In 1959, Chester County purchased the airport and took over operations. At the time, Chester County Area Airport Authority was formed and the airport was renamed to Chester County Airport. In 1962, the airport was renamed in honor of the first Authority chairman, G. O. Carlson.

== Facilities ==
The airport covers 352 acres (142 ha); its one runway, 11/29, is 5,400 x 100 ft (1,646 x 30 m) asphalt. In the year ending December 12, 2022, the airport had 42,274 aircraft operations, average 116 per day: 94% general aviation, 6% air taxi and <1% military. 77 aircraft at the time were based at the airport: 58 single-engine, 11 multi-engine, 7 jet, and 1 helicopter.

== Expansion ==
As part of the 12-year-plan for the airport, many projects are planned. A new apron is planned south of the current runway. New hangars will be built for corporate jets. The biggest project is a new 6,000-foot (1,800 m) long runway, more aligned with the usual winds at the airport. The current runway will remain. A control tower is being discussed, if traffic increases.

== See also ==
- List of airports in Pennsylvania
