= Jackson's Sawmill Covered Bridge =

Covered bridge in Pennsylvania, US

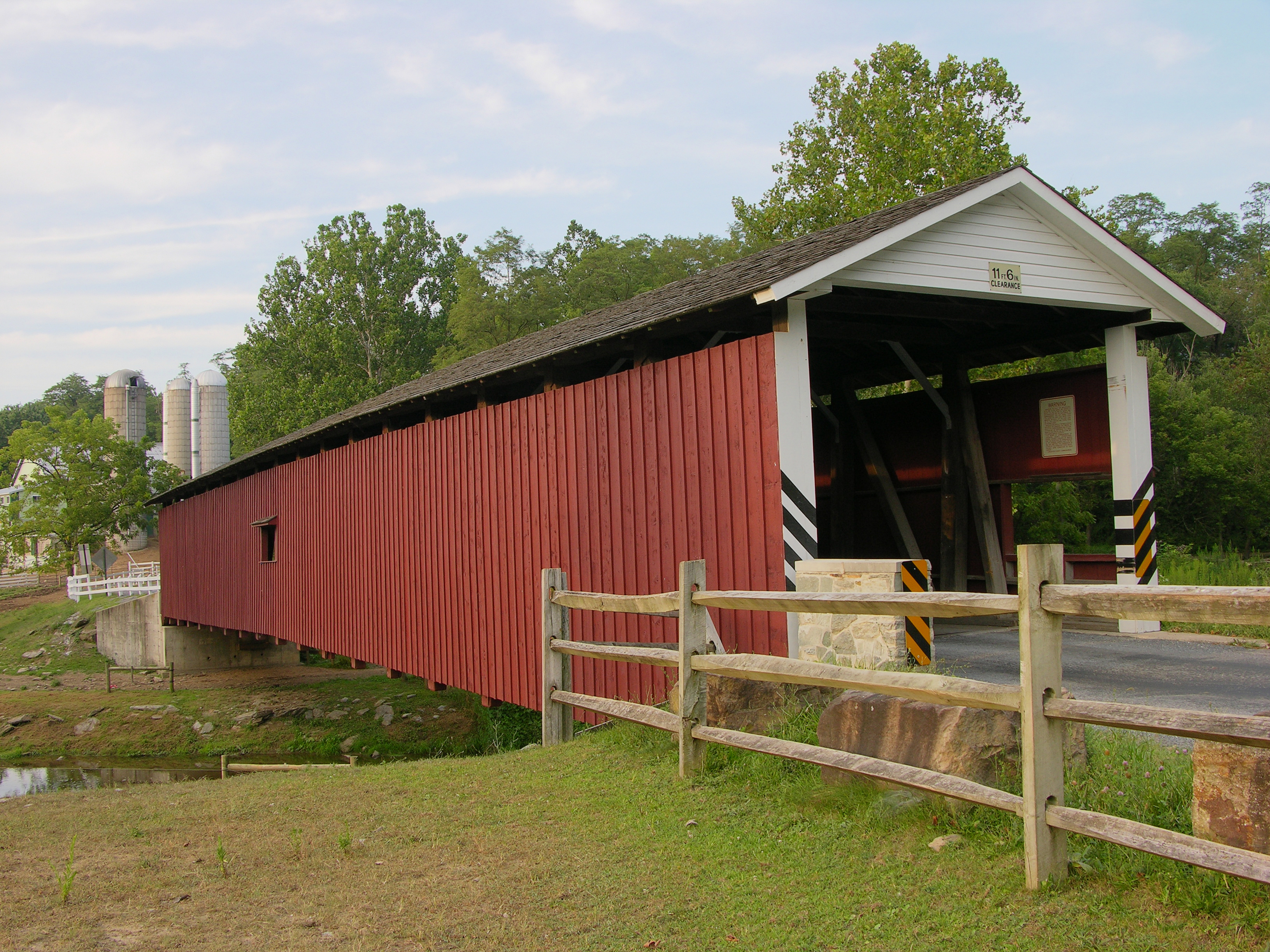
- Coordinates: 39.8970°N 76.0800°W
- Locale: Lancaster County, Pennsylvania, United States
- Official name: West Octoraro #1 Bridge

Characteristics
- Design: single span, double Burr arch truss
- Total length: 139 feet (42.4 m)

History
- Constructed by: John Smith and Samuel Stauffer
- Construction start: 1878
- Jackson's Sawmill Covered Bridge
- Formerly listed on the U.S. National Register of Historic Places
- MPS: Covered Bridges of Lancaster County TR
- NRHP reference No.: 80003520

Significant dates
- Added to NRHP: December 11, 1980
- Removed from NRHP: June 27, 1986

Location
- Interactive map of Jackson's Sawmill Covered Bridge

The Jackson's Sawmill Covered Bridge or Eichelberger's Covered Bridge is a covered bridge that spans the West Branch of the Octoraro Creek in Lancaster County, Pennsylvania. A county-owned and maintained bridge, its official designation is the West Octoraro #1 Bridge. The bridge is purportedly the only covered bridge in the county that is not built perpendicular to the stream it crosses due to the placement of the sawmill on one side of the bridge and the rock formations faced by the builders on the other side.

The bridge has a single span, wooden, double Burr arch trusses design with the addition of steel hanger rods. The deck is made from oak planks. It is painted red, the traditional color of Lancaster County covered bridges, on both the inside and outside. Both approaches to the bridge are painted in the traditional white color.

The bridge's WGCB Number is 38-36-33. In 1980 it was added to the National Register of Historic Places as structure number 80003520, but it was removed from the Register in 1986. It is located at 39°53′49.2″N 76°4′48″W (39.89700, -76.08000). The bridge lies in Bart Township, 3.25 mi (5.23 km) to the east of Quarryville and 1.5 mi (2.4 km) south of Pennsylvania Route 372 on Mt Pleasant Road. Due to its remote location in an isolated part of the county, it is seen less than many of the county's other covered bridges that are closer to the major populations centers such as Lancaster.

== History ==
The bridge was built in 1878 by John Smith and Samuel Stauffer at a cost of $2,410. It was last rebuilt and rededicated by the County Commissioners in 1985 at a cost of $75,000 after it was washed away mostly intact from its foundations and deposited a short distance downstream in a flood. During the rebuilding, the bridge was raised 3 feet (0.91 m) to protect it against future flooding. A year later in 1986, it was removed from the National Register of Historic Places. As of summer 2006, the bridge was in good conditions, having undergone a recent rehabilitation in May 2005.

== Dimensions ==
- Length: 139 feet (42 m) span and 143 feet (44 m) total length
- Width: 14 feet (4.3 m) clear deck and 15 feet (4.6 m) total width
- Overhead clearance: 11 feet 6 inches (3.51 m)
- Underclearance: 14 feet (4.3 m)

== Gallery ==
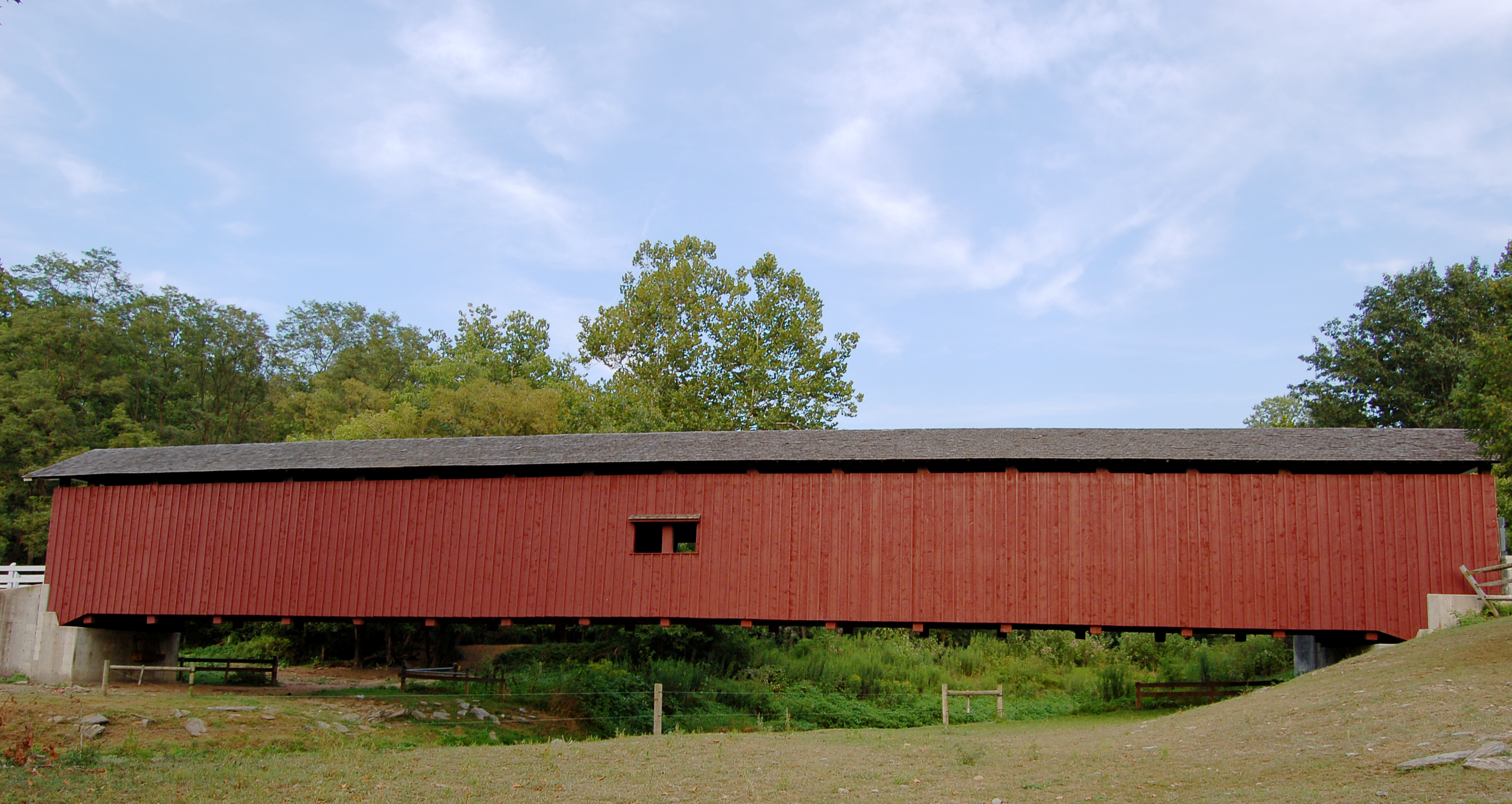
A wide view of the bridge

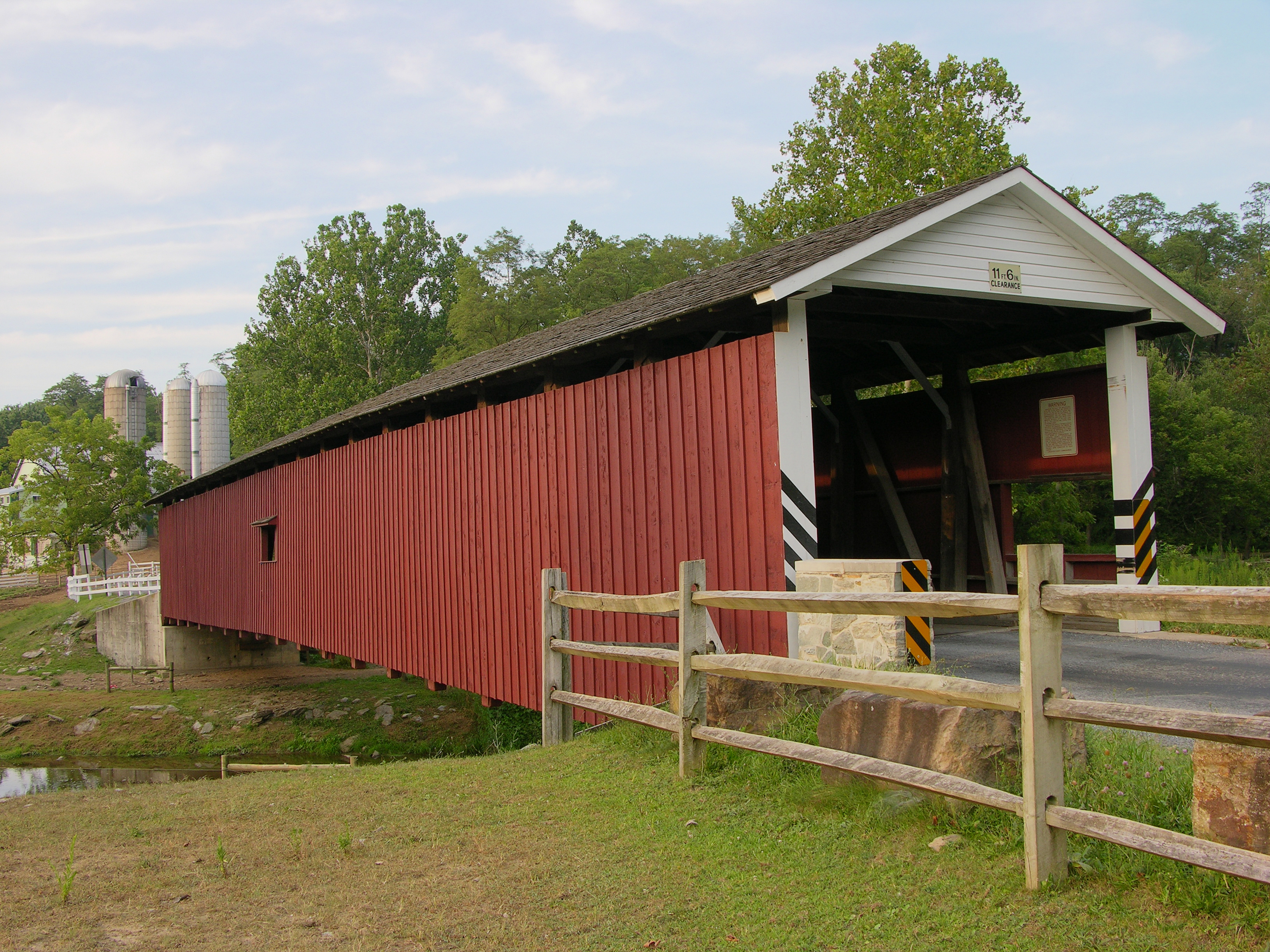
Three quarters view

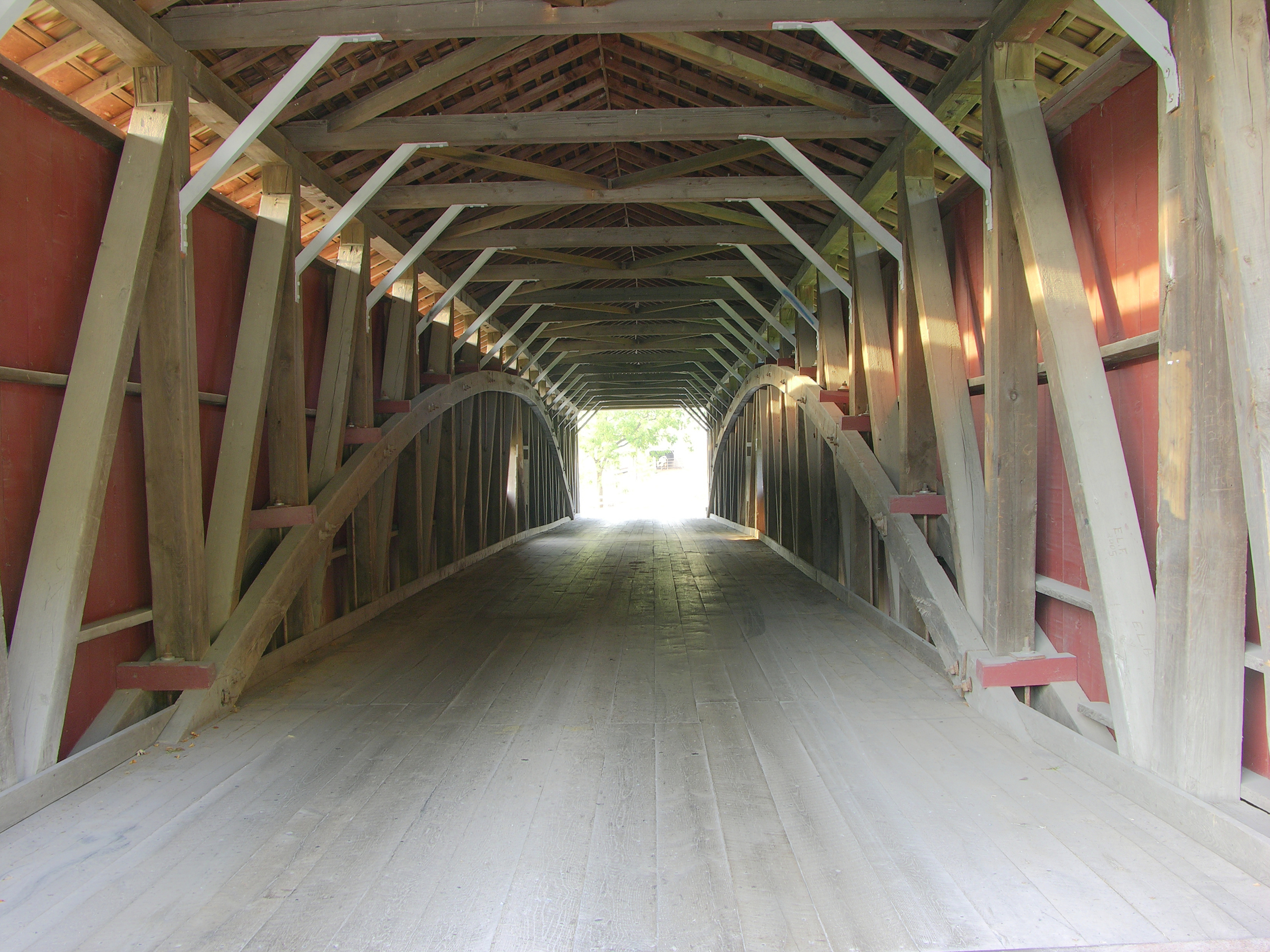
View of the inside of the bridge showing the Burr arch truss

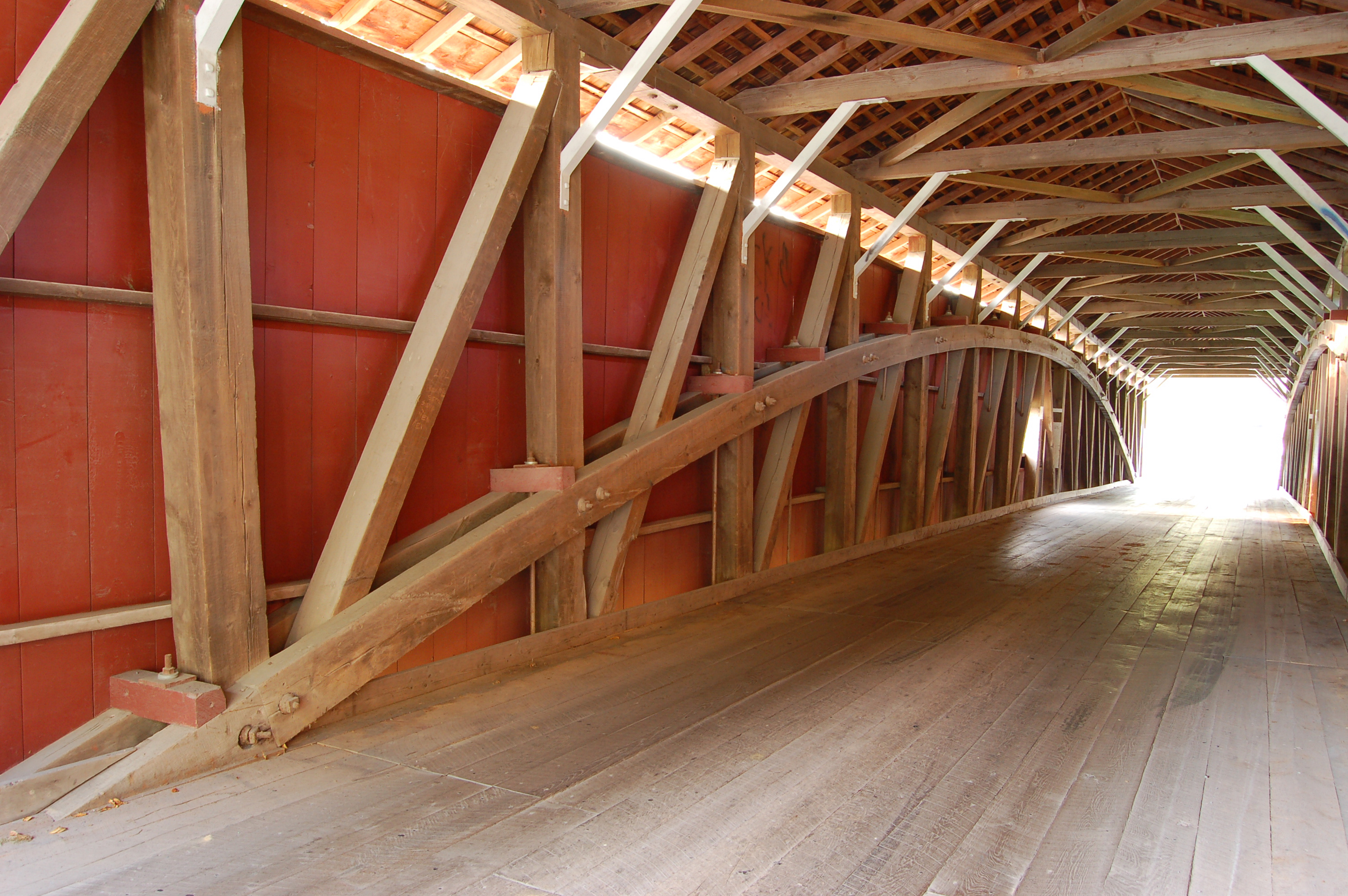
A closeup of the Burr arch truss

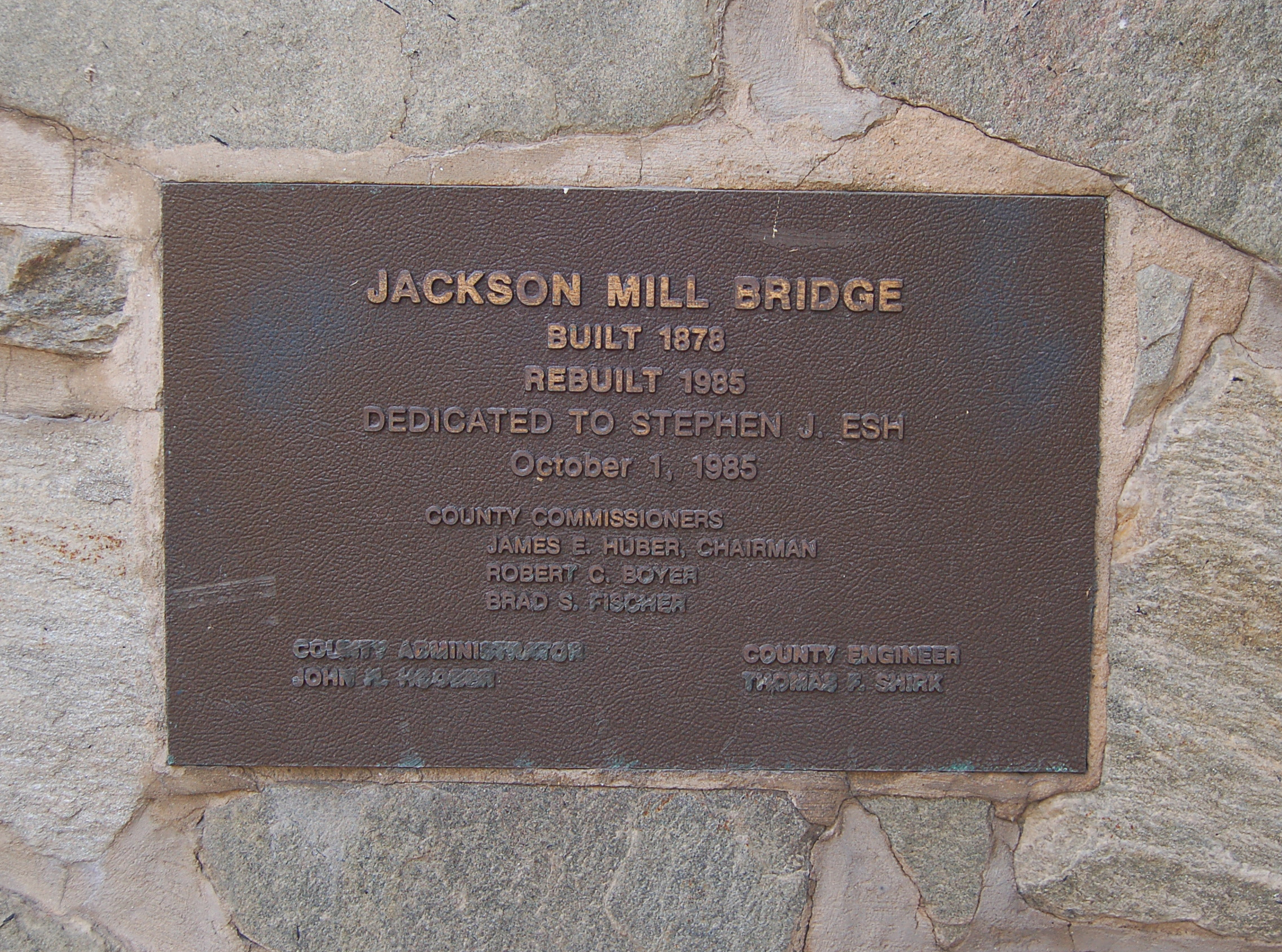
A metal nameplate describing the 1985 rebuilding

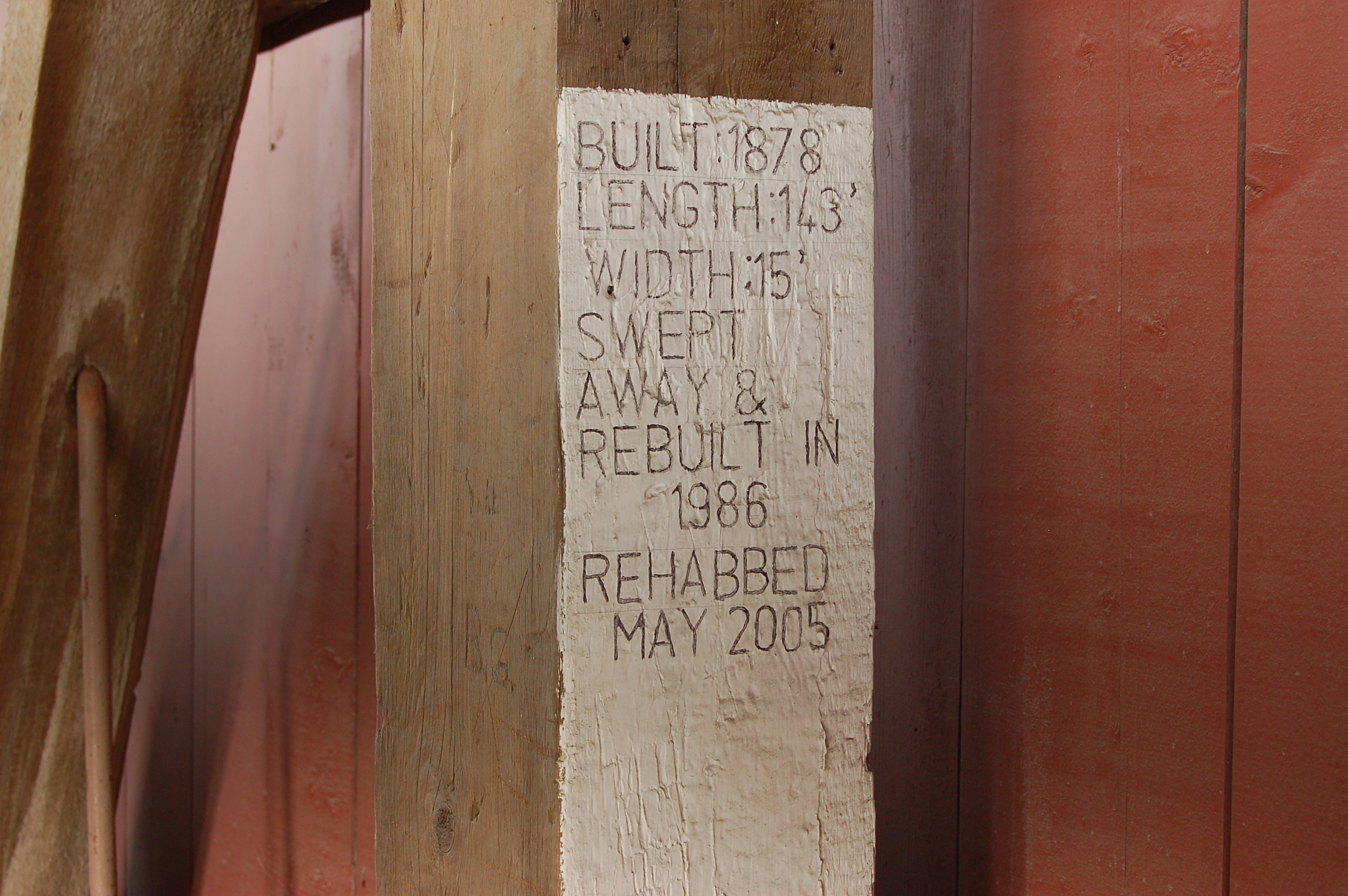
Sign inside the bridge describing its history

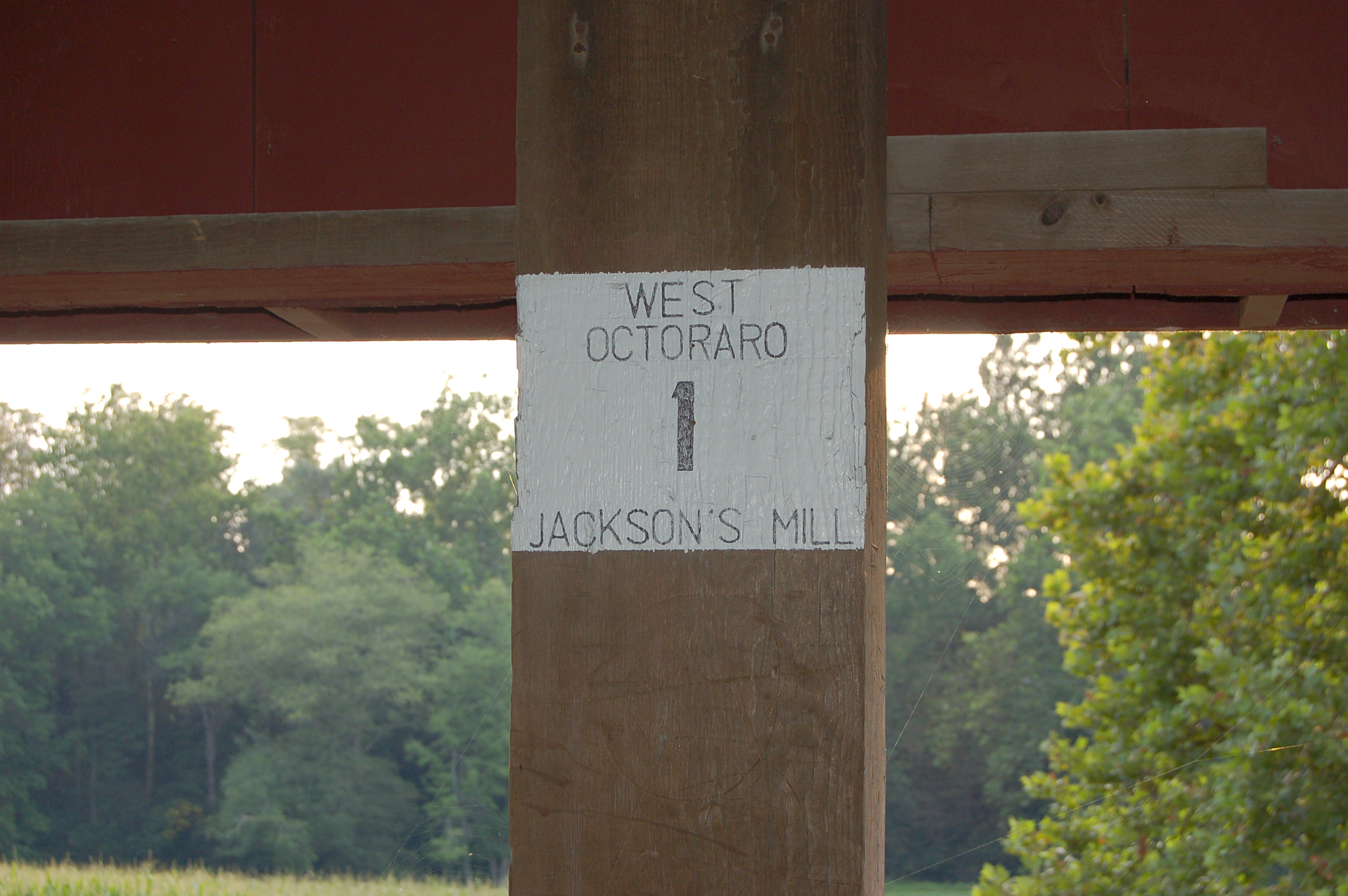
The identification sign inside the center of the bridge

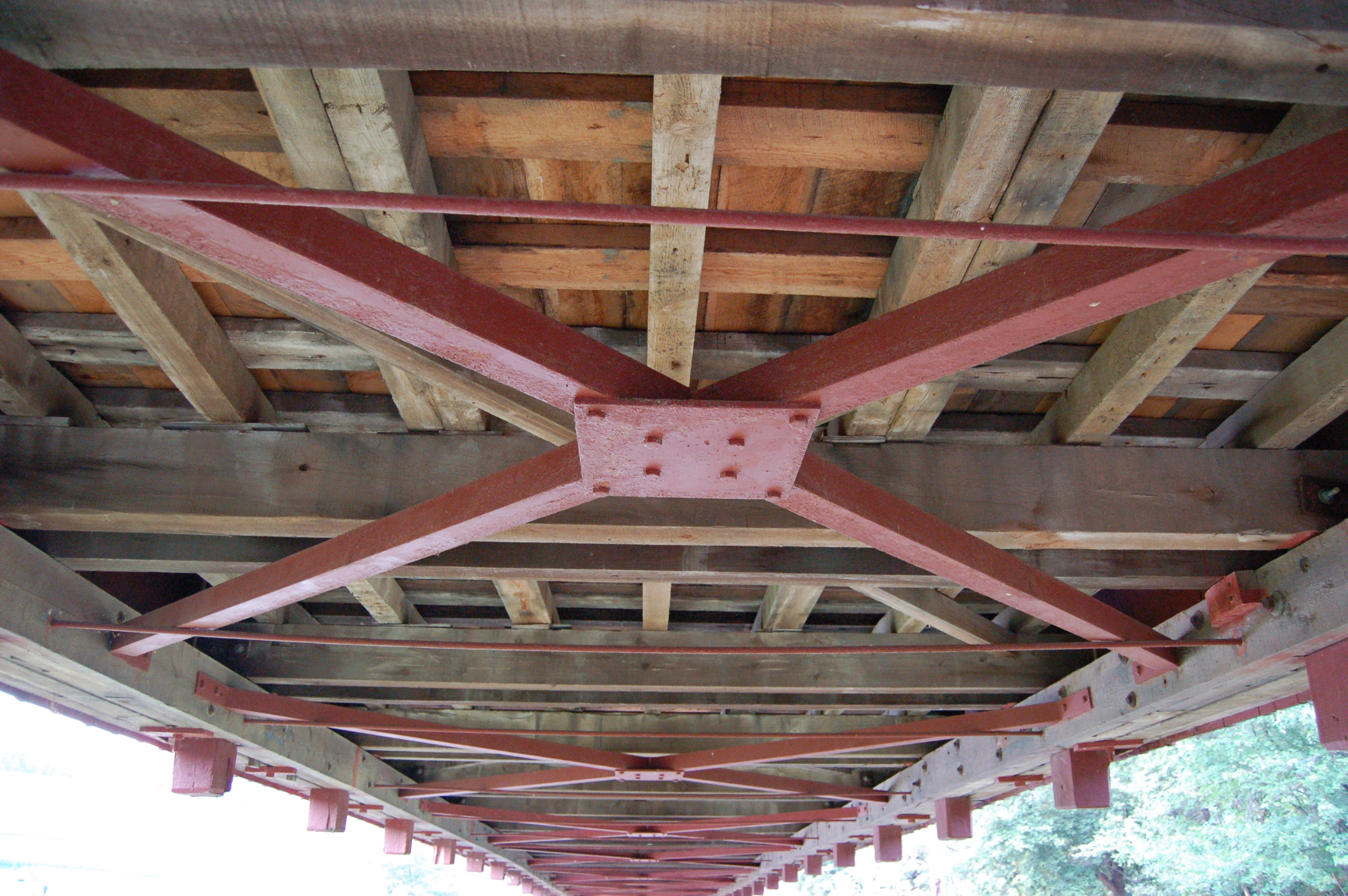
The underside of the bridge

== See also ==
- Burr arch truss
- List of Lancaster County covered bridges
