= Nickel Mines, Pennsylvania =

Unincorporated community in Pennsylvania, US

- Hamlet
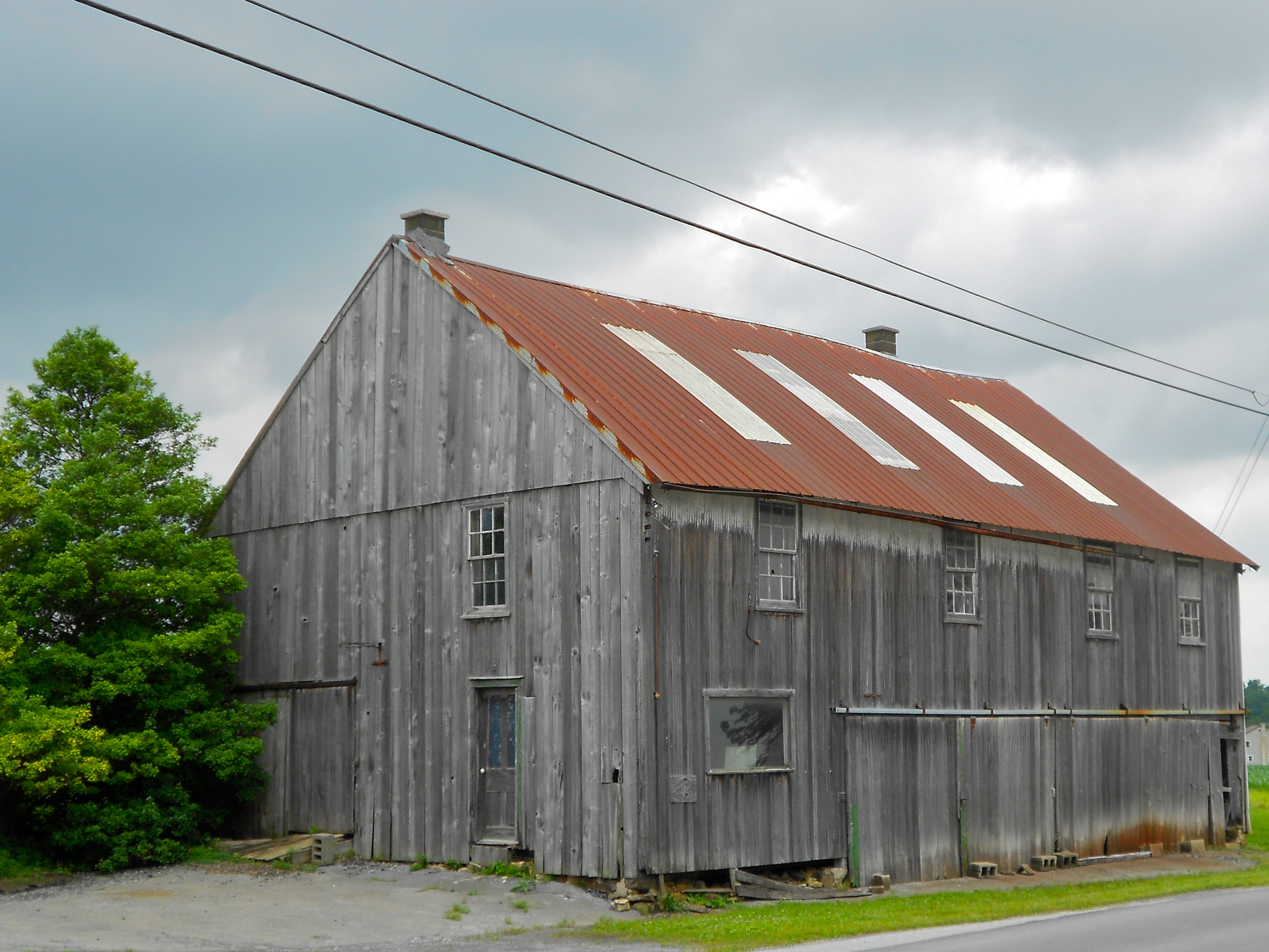
- Barn in town

- Location in Pennsylvania Location in the United States
- Coordinates: 39°57′32″N 76°4′50″W
- Country: United States
- State: Pennsylvania
- County: Lancaster
- Township: Bart

Area
  - Total: 0.38 sq mi (0.98 km^{2})
  - Land: 0.38 sq mi (0.98 km^{2})

Population (2010)
  - Total: 35
  - Estimate (2016): 32
  - Density: 92/sq mi (36/km^{2})
- Time zone: UTC-5 (Eastern (EST))
  - Summer (DST): UTC-4 (EDT)
- ZIP codes: 17562
- Area code: 717
- GNIS feature ID: 1182445

Nickel Mines is a hamlet that is located in Bart Township, Lancaster County, Pennsylvania, United States. The zip code is 17562 and the area code is 717.

The area now has a sizable Amish community.

== History ==
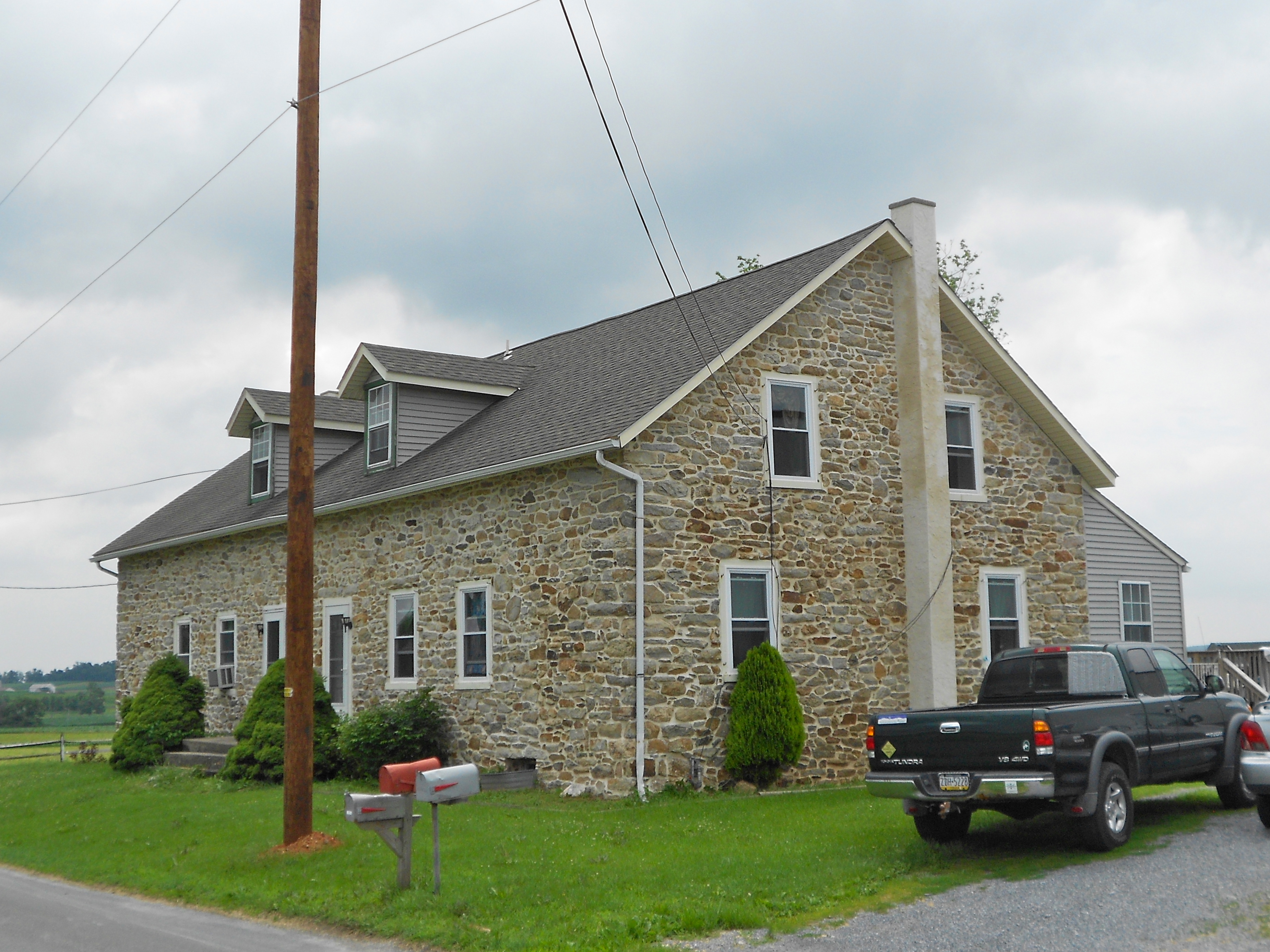
House near the crossroads of White Oaks and Mine Roads

The nickel mines that give the town its name were worked in a deposit of sulfide ore, principally millerite. The mines were originally opened during the early eighteenth century for copper, but were given up as unproductive.

In 1849, the Gap Mining Company attempted to work the mines for copper, again unsuccessfully, but discovered the presence of nickel in late 1852 or early 1853. (The ore had previously been misidentified as iron sulfide). An Episcopal Church was built in 1857 to serve the mining community at the time.

Gap Mining worked the mines for nickel until 1860, when they were closed as unprofitable. It sold the mine to Joseph Wharton in late 1862. Between 1862 and 1893, 4.5 million pounds of nickel were extracted from the site, amounting to as much as twenty-five percent of world production in some years. Wharton refined the nickel in Camden, New Jersey and was the first industrial producer of malleable nickel. He was influential in persuading the United States Mint to issue the first five-cent nickel coins in 1866, using nickel produced from his mines.

In 1883, the town consisted of the superintendent's mansion, twenty-three miners' homes, a store with dwelling, and five outbuildings.

The mine closed in 1893 because of competition from the new nickel mines in Sudbury, Ontario, Canada. No trace of the mines remains today, except for a few waste dumps. The area is now entirely agricultural.

=== 2006 school shooting ===
On October 2, 2006, the community became the subject of national media attention after a lone gunman, identified as Charles Carl Roberts IV, took ten girls hostage for nearly an hour at a one-room Amish schoolhouse serving the community. He then shot all ten hostages, killing five of them, and later committed suicide as responding police officers tried to breach the schoolhouse. The emphasis on forgiveness and reconciliation in the response of the Amish community became a topic of wide discussion in numerous national media outlets.

== Demographics ==
Historical population
Census	Pop.	Note	%±
1990	30		—
2000	43		43.3%
2010	35		−18.6%
2016 (est.)	32		−8.6%

As of 2016, there were 16 households.
