= Bart Township, Pennsylvania =

Township in Pennsylvania, US

Coordinates: 39°55′00″N 76°04′59″W

- Township
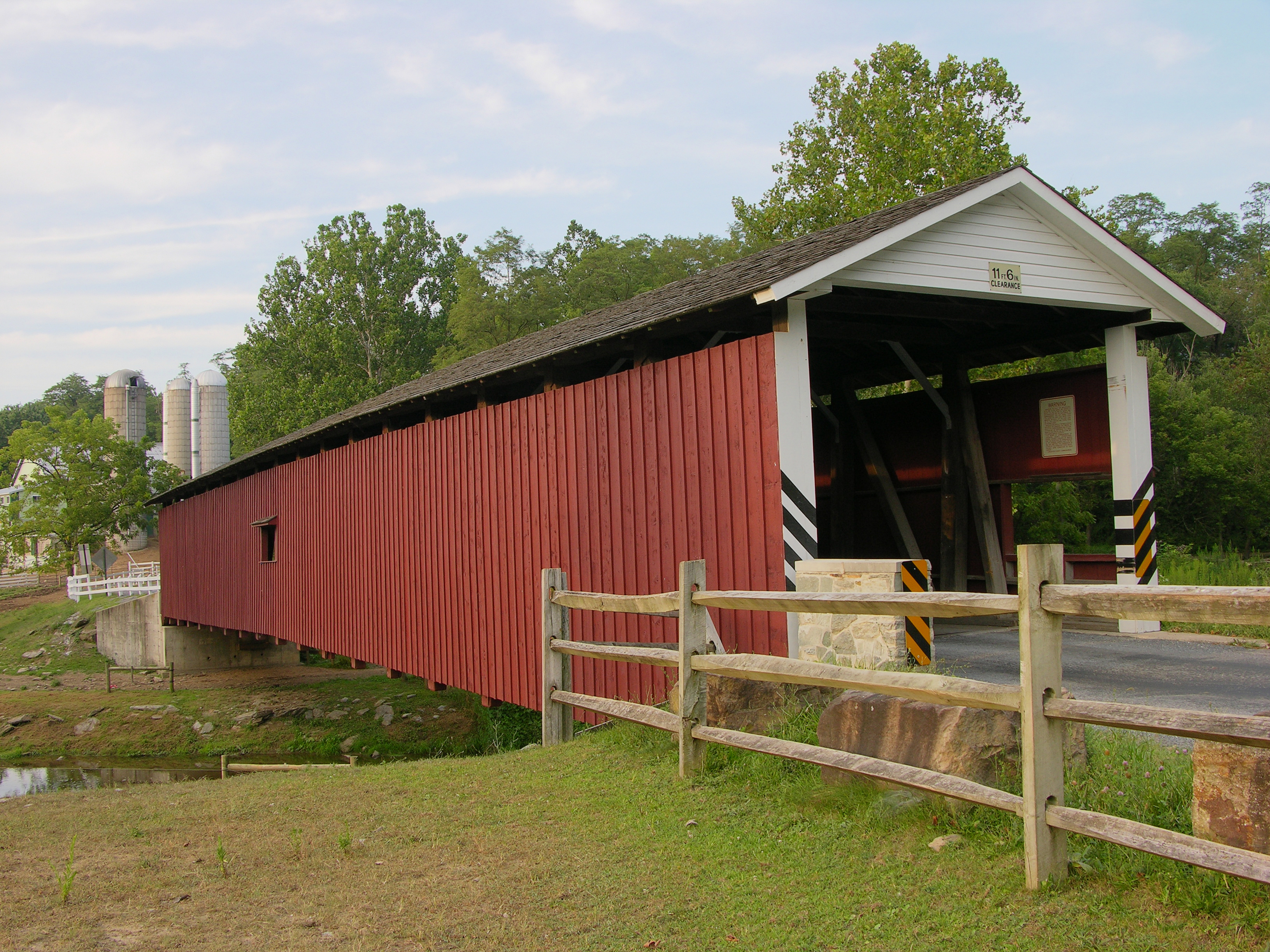
- Jackson's Sawmill Covered Bridge in Bart Township

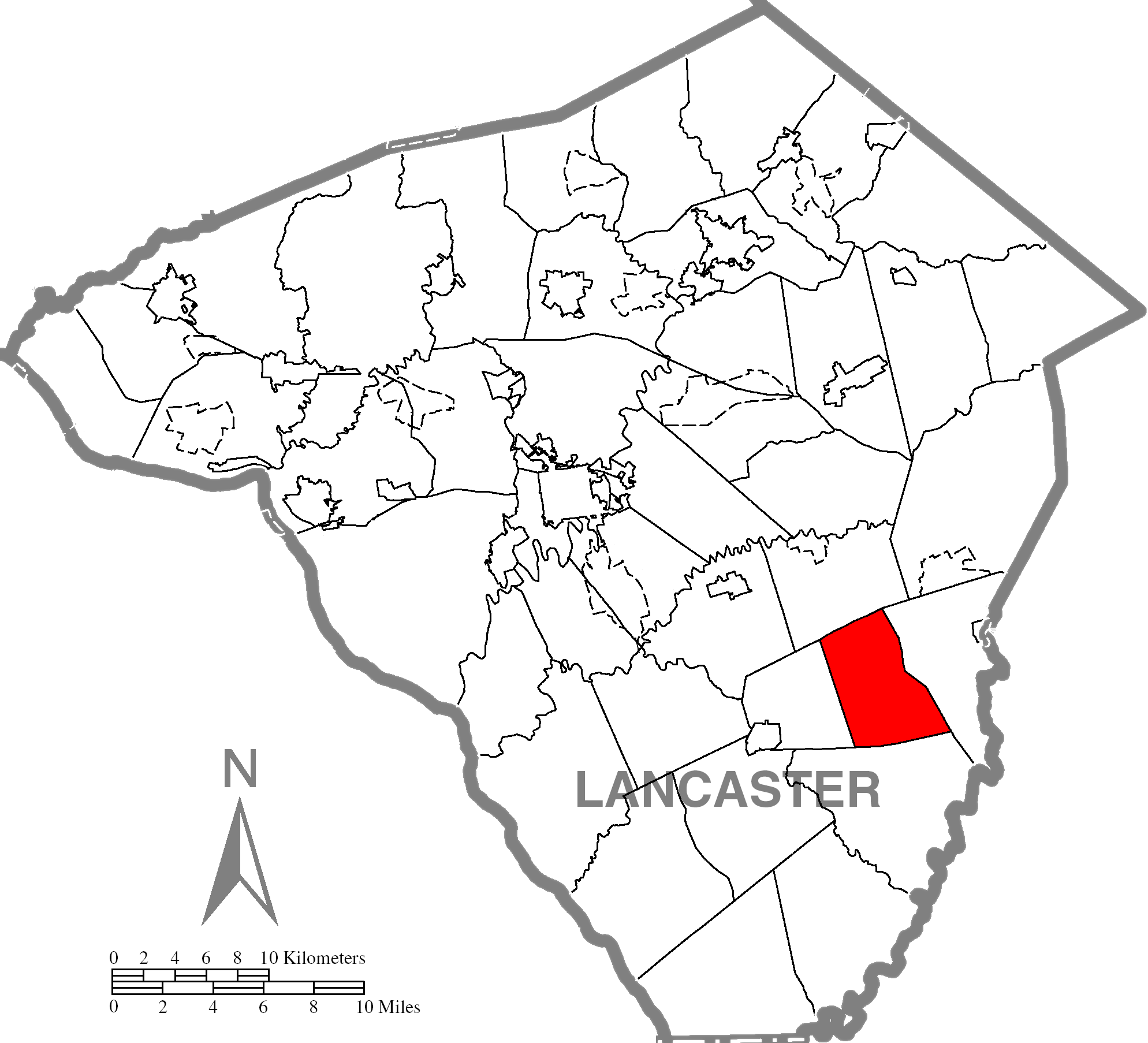
- Map of Lancaster County, Pennsylvania highlighting Bart Township

- Map of Lancaster County, Pennsylvania
- Country: United States
- State: Pennsylvania
- County: Lancaster
- Incorporated: 1744

Government
  - Type: Board of Supervisors

Area
  - Total: 16.45 sq mi (42.61 km^{2})
  - Land: 16.39 sq mi (42.46 km^{2})
  - Water: 0.054 sq mi (0.14 km^{2})

Population (2020)
  - Total: 3,181
  - Density: 194.0/sq mi (74.92/km^{2})
- Time zone: UTC-5 (Eastern (EST))
  - Summer (DST): UTC-4 (EDT)
- Area code: 717
- FIPS code: 42-071-04376
- Website: https://www.barttwp.com/

Bart Township is a township in southeastern Lancaster County, Pennsylvania, United States. At the 2020 census, the population was 3,181, up from 3,094 at the 2010 census.

Situated in a highly Amish region of Lancaster County, only 43.7% of the township's population speaks English, while 56.3% speaks an "other [than Spanish] Indo-European language" (almost entirely Pennsylvania German/German).

== History ==
=== Founding ===
The name of Bart Township apparently comes from a reinterpretation of the abbreviation "Bart." for "Baronet". This abbreviation was used by former Colonial Governor Sir William Keith, Bart. After being forced out of the Governorship by Hannah Penn, Sir William Keith, Bart. won election as an Assemblyman in Philadelphia. In March 1728, Sir William Keith, Bart. left Pennsylvania in a hurry—he was running out on his debts. He left for England, never to return He abandoned his wife, Lady Keith, who is buried in Christ Church Cemetery in Philadelphia.

What is now Bart Township was part of Sadsbury, Chester County before the formation of Lancaster County.

In 1744, Sadsbury Township was split into two; the western part was organized as Bart Township and the eastern part remained Sadsbury Township. In 1854, Bart Township was split into two, with the western part organized as Eden Township, and the eastern part remaining Bart Township.

=== Modern history ===
On October 2, 2006, a lone gunman, identified as Charles Carl Roberts IV, shot ten Amish schoolgirls, killing five of them, in an attack on West Nickel Mines Parochial School, an Amish one-room school in Nickel Mines, Bart Township. Roberts then shot and killed himself as police responded.

== Geography ==
According to the U.S. Census Bureau, the township has a total area of 16.2 square miles (42 km^{2}), all land. It includes the communities of Nickel Mines, Georgetown (Bart P.O.), Mount Pleasant, Green Tree, Ninepoints, and Bartville.

== Demographics ==
Historical population
Census	Pop.	Note	%±
1980	2,235		—
1990	2,774		24.1%
2000	3,003		8.3%
2010	3,094		3.0%
2020	3,181		2.8%
U.S. Decennial Census 2020

As of the census of 2000, there were 3,003 people, 820 households, and 700 families residing in the township. The population density was 185.3 inhabitants per square mile (71.5/km^{2}). There were 836 housing units at an average density of 51.6 units per square mile (19.9 units/km^{2}). The racial makeup of the township was 98.60% White, 0.80% Black or African American, 0.27% Native American, 0.17% from other races, and 0.17% from two or more races. 0.13% of the population were Hispanic or Latino of any race.

There were 820 households, out of which 45.7% had children under the age of 18 living with them, 77.9% were married couples living together, 4.5% had a female householder with no husband present, and 14.6% were non-families. 12.8% of all households were made up of individuals, and 7.7% had someone living alone who was 65 years of age or older. The average household size was 3.66 and the average family size was 4.04.

In the township the population was spread out, with 37.4% under the age of 18, 11.0% from 18 to 24, 23.5% from 25 to 44, 18.7% from 45 to 64, and 9.5% who were 65 years of age or older. The median age was 27 years. For every 100 females, there were 102.2 males. For every 100 females age 18 and over, there were 101.5 males.

The median income for a household in the township was $45,250, and the median income for a family was $47,604. Males had a median income of $33,387 versus $21,379 for females. The per capita income for the township was $14,399. About 10.3% of families and 13.0% of the population were below the poverty line, including 19.7% of those under age 18 and 11.0% of those age 65 or over.

== Education ==
Bart Township is served by the Solanco School District.
