= Ninepoints, Pennsylvania =

Unincorporated community in Pennsylvania, US

- Unincorporated community
- Location within Pennsylvania Location within the United States
- Coordinates: 39°54′48″N 76°2′43″W
- Country: United States
- State: Pennsylvania
- County: Lancaster
- Township: Bart
- Elevation: 715 ft (218 m)
- Time zone: UTC-5 (Eastern (EST))
  - Summer (DST): UTC-4 (EDT)
- Area code: 717
- GNIS feature ID: 1182468

Ninepoints (also known as Nine Points) is an unincorporated community in Bart Township in Lancaster County, Pennsylvania, United States. Ninepoints is located at the intersection of Pennsylvania Route 896 and Noble Road.
