= Les McCrabb =

American baseball player (1914-2008)

- Pitcher
- Born: November 4, 1914; Wakefield, Pennsylvania, U.S.
- Died: October 8, 2008 (aged 93); Lancaster, Pennsylvania, U.S.
- Batted: Right Threw: Right

MLB debut
- September 7, 1939, for the Philadelphia Athletics

Last MLB appearance
- May 4, 1950, for the Philadelphia Athletics

MLB statistics
- Win–loss record: 10–15
- Earned run average: 5.96
- Strikeouts: 57

Teams
- Philadelphia Athletics (1939–1942, 1950)

Lester William "Buster" McCrabb (November 4, 1914 – October 8, 2008) was an American starting pitcher who played in Major League Baseball. He batted and threw right-handed. The 5 ft 11 in (1.80 m), 175 lb (79 kg) McCrabb was born in Wakefield, Pennsylvania.

== Biography ==
McCrabb's professional baseball playing career began in 1937 and lasted for a dozen seasons. He was obtained by the Philadelphia Athletics from the Wilkes-Barre team (Eastern) as part of a minor league working agreement. He reached the majors in 1939 with the Athletics, spending four consecutive years for them. In his only full season, he went 9–13 for the last-place 1941 A's with 11 complete games, one shutout (a seven-hit, three-strikeout whitewashing of the defending American League champion Detroit Tigers on July 27 at Shibe Park) and two saves. After an eight-year absence, including spending 1942–1947 in the minors, he returned with the club in 1950 for his last Major League appearance, then served the Athletics as a full-time coach from 1951–1954.

In a five-season American League career, McCrabb posted a 10–15 record with 57 strikeouts and a 5.96 ERA in 210 innings, including 13 complete games, one shutout, and one save. He surrendered 270 hits and 63 bases on balls.

== Death ==
At the time of his death, aged 93, McCrabb was recognized as one of the oldest living MLB players. He died on October 8, 2008, and was survived by his wife Gladys Sprout McCrabb.
