= Pennsylvania Route 272 =

State highway in Pennsylvania, US

Pennsylvania Route 272

Route information
- Maintained by PennDOT
- Length: 54.666 mi (87.976 km)

Major junctions
- South end: MD 272 at the Maryland state line near Nottingham
- US 1 in Nottingham; US 222 in Fulton Township; PA 372 in Buck; US 222 / PA 741 in Willow Street; PA 72 in Lancaster; PA 23 / PA 462 in Lancaster; US 30 / US 222 in Lancaster; PA 772 in Brownstown; US 322 in Ephrata
- North end: US 222 / PA 568 near Adamstown

Location
- Country: United States
- State: Pennsylvania
- Counties: Chester, Lancaster, Berks

Highway system
- Pennsylvania State Route System; Interstate; US; State; Scenic; Legislative
← PA 271	→ PA 274

Pennsylvania Route 272 (PA 272) is a 54.7-mile-long (88.0 km) highway in southeastern Pennsylvania, in the Lancaster area. The southern terminus of the route is at the Mason–Dixon line southeast of Nottingham, where the road continues into Maryland as Maryland Route 272 (MD 272). The northern terminus is at an interchange with U.S. Route 222 (US 222) and PA 568 near Adamstown, where PA 568 continues east. The route heads from the Maryland border northwest through the southwestern corner of Chester County, intersecting US 1 in Nottingham. PA 272 continues west into Lancaster County and intersects US 222 in Wakefield, where it turns north and passes through Buck before widening into a divided highway as it comes to another junction with US 222 in Willow Street. Here, the route becomes unsigned and follows US 222 north through Lancaster along a one-way pair of city streets. North of Lancaster, US 222 splits at an interchange with US 30 and PA 272 becomes signed again, heading northeast parallel to the freeway alignment of US 222 and passing through Akron, Ephrata (where it intersects US 322), and Adamstown. The route enters Berks County and comes to its northern terminus.

PA 272 was first designated in 1928 to run from US 222/PA 72 in Wakefield east to US 1/PA 12 in Nottingham. The route was fully paved by 1940. In the 1940s, PA 272 was extended south from Nottingham to the Maryland border, replacing a section of PA 42 between the Maryland border and Chrome. The route was extended north from Wakefield to US 222 in Willow Street in the 1960s. This extension replaced what became a southern extension of PA 72 from Lancaster in the 1930s. The route was extended from Willow Street to US 222 and PA 568 in Adamstown following the completion of the US 222 freeway between Lancaster and Adamstown in 1977. PA 272 followed US 222 through Lancaster and ran along the former alignment of US 222 between Lancaster and Adamstown. In 2006, the intersection at the northern terminus was converted to an interchange following the extension of the US 222 freeway from Adamstown to the Reading area.

== Route description ==
PA 272 is mostly in Lancaster County, except for about a mile at the northern terminus where it enters Berks County and the southernmost part of the route, which is in Chester County. Through the city of Lancaster, it is unsigned but concurrent with US 222.

=== Maryland state line to Lancaster ===
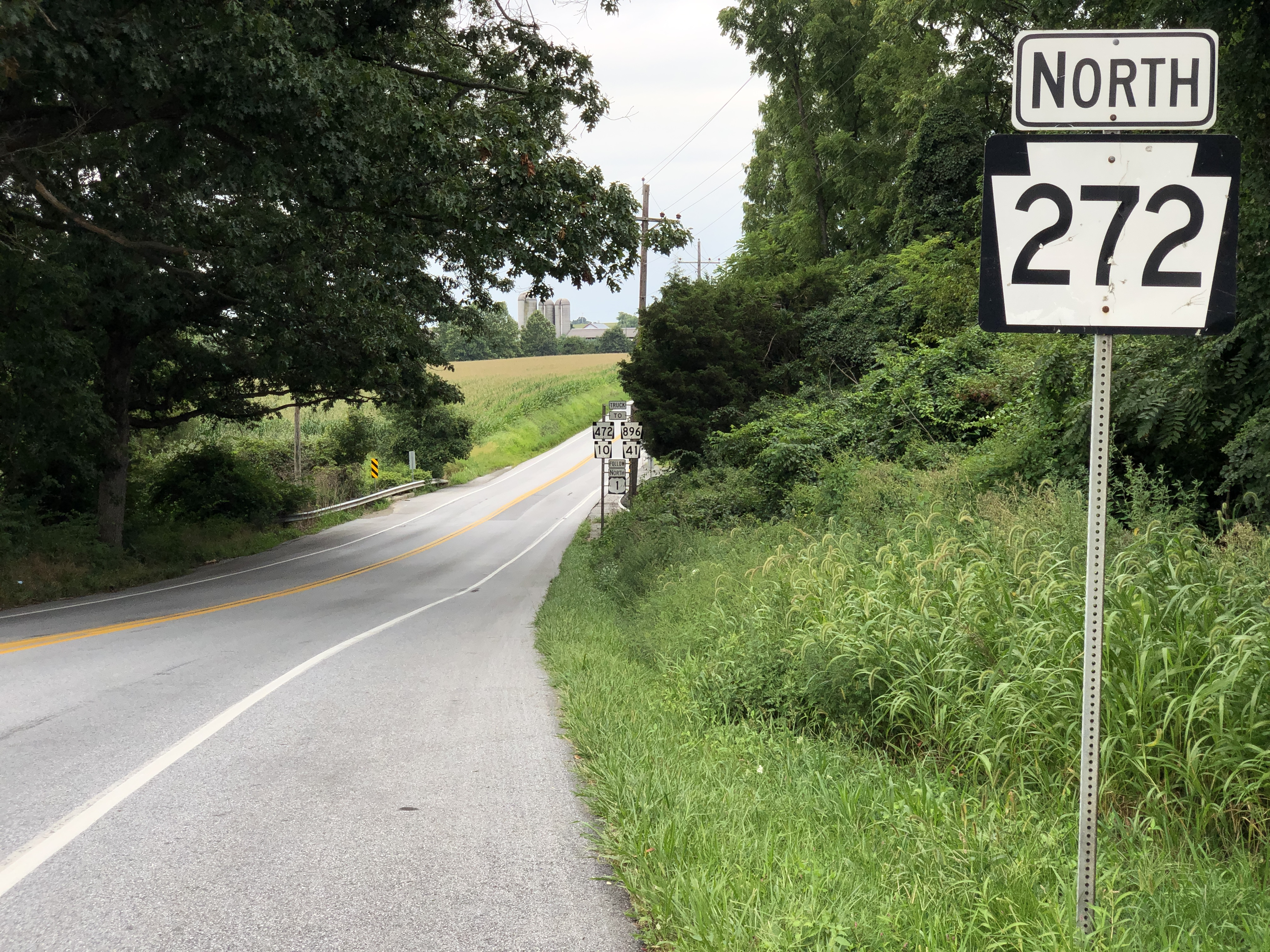
PA 272 northbound past its southern terminus at MD 272 at the Maryland state line in East Nottingham Township

The southern terminus of PA 272 is at the Maryland state line in East Nottingham Township in Chester County, where the road continues south into that state as MD 272. From the state line, the route heads north on two-lane undivided Chrome Road through a mix of farmland and woodland. In the community of Chrome, PA 272 turns west on Christine Road and continues northwest through agricultural areas with some trees and homes. The road crosses the North East Creek into West Nottingham Township and runs through more rural areas before reaching the community of Nottingham. Here, the route passes homes and comes to a bridge over an East Penn Railroad line before it intersects Baltimore Pike to the north of the Herr's plant. PA 272 runs past a mix of residences and businesses and comes to a partial cloverleaf interchange with the US 1 freeway. A park and ride lot is situated within the northwest portion of this interchange. Past this interchange, the road heads through a mix of farmland and residential subdivisions, reaching the community of Glen Roy. The route continues west into wooded areas with some fields.

PA 272 crosses the Octoraro Creek into Little Britain Township in Lancaster County and becomes Nottingham Road, curving northwest into agricultural areas with some trees and homes. The road reaches the community of Oak Hill and turns west, passing through more rural land. The route passes near residential development in the community of Little Britain before it continues through farmland and passes through Oakryn. PA 272 enters Fulton Township and runs through agricultural areas with occasional homes, reaching an intersection with US 222 in the community of Wakefield. At this point, the route turns north for a concurrency with US 222 along Robert Fulton Highway, running through a mix of farms and homes. PA 272 splits from US 222 in the community of Penn Hill by heading northwest along Lancaster Pike. The road heads through agricultural areas with some trees and homes, curving north and leaving Fulton Township, where it becomes the border between Drumore Township to the west and East Drumore Township to the east. The route continues through rural areas and turns northwest, passing through the communities of Hensell and Drumore Center. PA 272 curves north and runs through more farmland with some residential and commercial development before coming to an intersection with PA 372 in the community of Buck. At this intersection, PA 272 crosses westbound PA 372 while eastbound PA 372 turns north for a short concurrency with northbound PA 272 before it splits to the east.

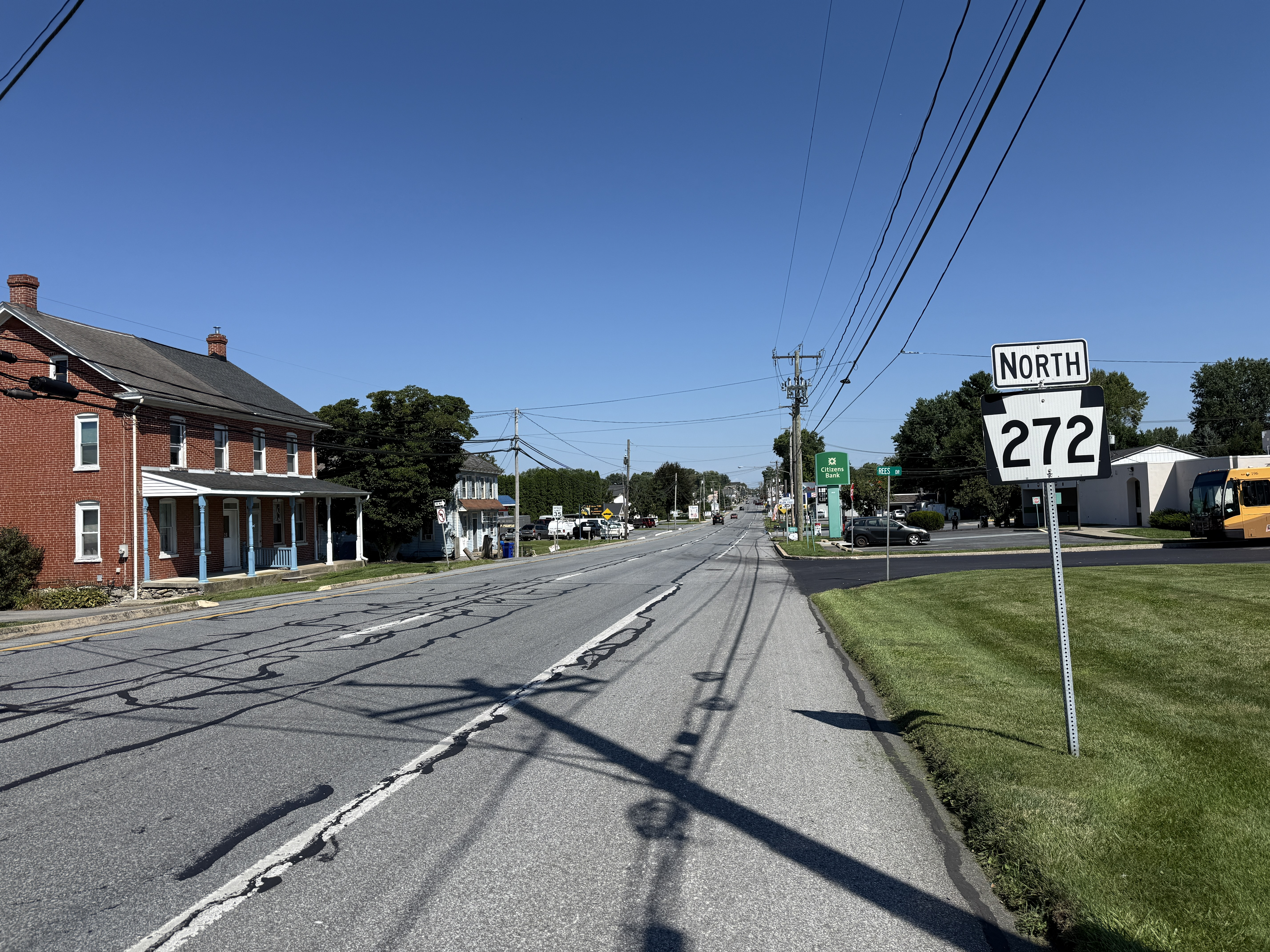
PA 272 northbound in Willow Street

Past Buck, PA 272 crosses into Providence Township and runs through a mix of farmland and woodland with some commercial development, passing to the east of Buck Motorsports Park and bending northwest. The road continues north through farms and woods with some homes and businesses. The route widens into a four-lane divided highway and the travel lanes split as the road heads northwest through wooded areas and passes under the Enola Low Grade Trail. Both directions of PA 272 rejoin in the community of Smithville and it continues north as a four-lane divided highway through a mix of farms and woods with some homes and businesses, curving northwest. The road crosses Pequea Creek into Pequea Township and becomes Willow Street Pike, continuing through rural areas with some development before reaching the community of Willow Street. Between Smithville and Willow Street, a few of the intersections along the divided highway are controlled by jughandles. In Willow Street, both directions of the route split, with the northbound direction heading into residential and commercial areas, while the southbound direction bypasses Willow Street to the west through farmland. PA 272 continues into West Lampeter Township and runs through more developed areas in Willow Street before it comes to a junction with US 222/PA 741.

At this point, US 222 turns north to join PA 272 along Willow Street Pike, and PA 272 becomes unsigned along the US 222 concurrency. Both directions of Willow Street Pike rejoin and it continues north as a two-lane undivided road past commercial development before it runs through wooded residential areas, passing through Hollinger. US 222/PA 272 crosses Mill Creek and heads through the community of Lyndon. The road briefly gains a center left-turn lane as it continues through wooded areas of development and passes to the west of a golf course. US 222/PA 272 splits into a one-way pair, with two lanes in each direction, and crosses the Conestoga River into Lancaster Township.

=== Lancaster to Adamstown ===
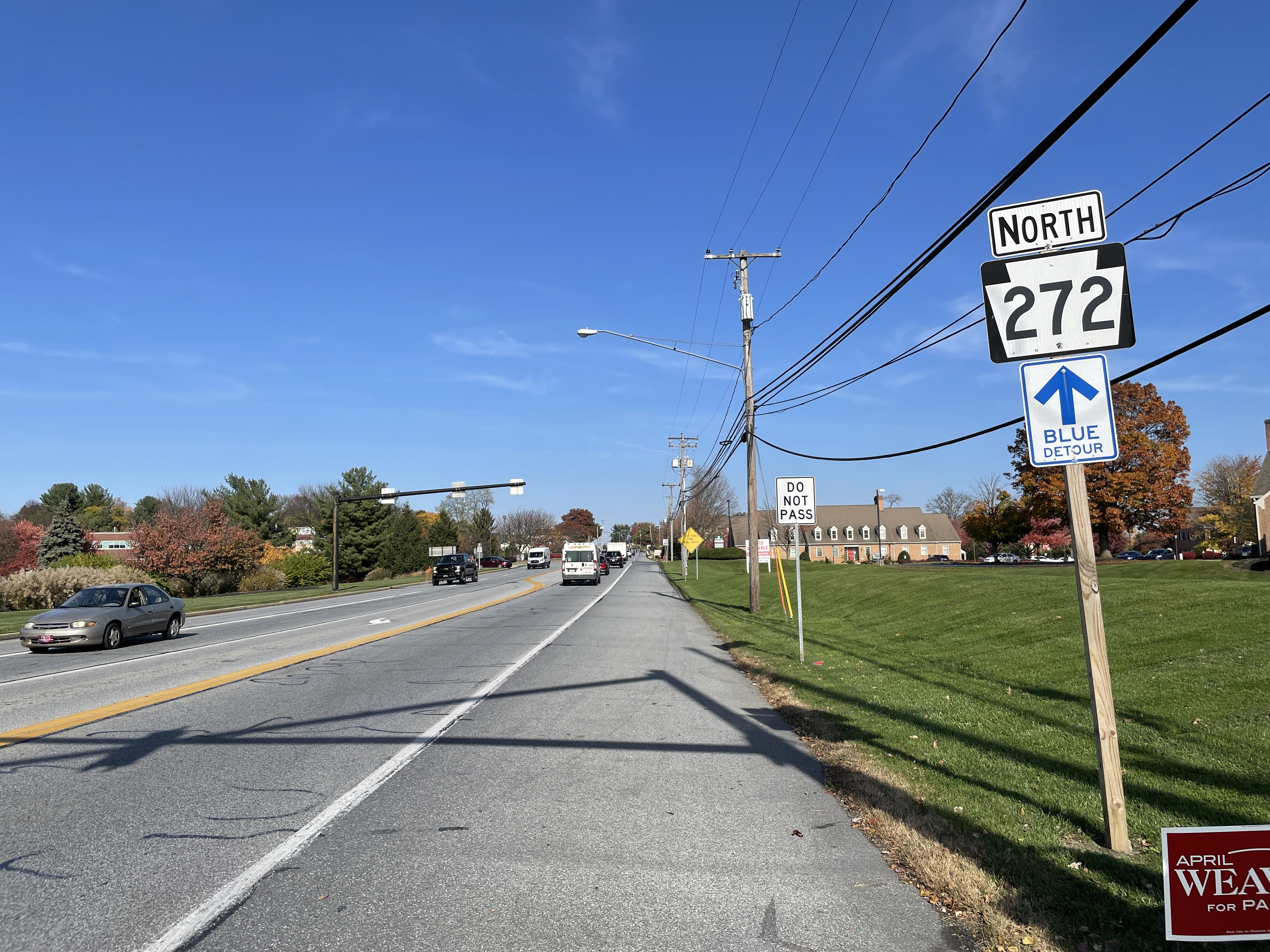
PA 272 northbound past Eden Road in Manheim Township

After crossing the Conestoga River, northbound US 222/PA 272 becomes Highland Avenue and southbound US 222/PA 272 is called South Prince Street. The southbound direction intersects PA 324 in the community of Engleside before the two routes continue into the city of Lancaster, heading into urban residential and commercial areas. A short distance after entering Lancaster, northbound US 222/PA 272 intersects the end of one-way northbound PA 324 and heads onto South Queen Street. The two routes continues past urban rowhouses along South Queen Street northbound and South Prince Street southbound, with South Queen Street passing to the west of Woodward Hill Cemetery. Northbound US 222/PA 272 splits from South Queen Street by heading northeast onto Church Street, which carries three lanes of one-way traffic, while northbound PA 72 starts along South Queen Street. Just south of downtown Lancaster, the northbound direction of the route turns north onto South Lime Street, which carries two lanes of one-way traffic. US 222/PA 272 heads into the commercial downtown of Lancaster and crosses eastbound PA 462 at King Street. Past this, the route becomes North Lime Street northbound and North Prince Street southbound, crossing eastbound PA 23 at Chestnut Street and westbound PA 23/PA 462 at Walnut Street. The two routes leave the downtown area and run through urban areas of homes and businesses. The northbound direction passes to the east of Lancaster General Hospital between East James and East Frederick streets while the southbound direction passes to the east of Penn Medicine Park, home of the Lancaster Stormers baseball team, north of the Harrisburg Avenue/West James Street intersection. At the intersection with Liberty Street, northbound US 222/PA 272 shifts west a block onto four-lane undivided North Duke Street, a two-way road, while the one-way pair continues into Manheim Township. A block later, at McGovern Avenue, both directions of US 222/PA 272 rejoin along North Duke Street. Southbound US 222/PA 272 follows McGovern Avenue west between North Duke Street and North Prince Street, forming the border between a portion of the city of Lancaster that is home to the Lancaster station along Amtrak's Keystone Corridor railroad line to the north and Manheim Township to the south. The roadway is a three-lane road with two westbound lanes that carry southbound US 222/PA 272 and one eastbound lane. McGovern Avenue reaches an intersection with northbound PA 72 at North Queen Street, where northbound PA 72 turns west to join southbound US 222/PA 272 along the road. At North Prince Street, southbound US 222/PA 272 turn south while PA 72 becomes two-way heading north.

Both directions of US 222/PA 272 continue north along four-lane undivided North Duke Street and the road reaches the Thaddeus Stevens Bridge over Amtrak's Keystone Corridor, where it becomes the border between Manheim Township to the west and Lancaster to the east. At Keller Avenue/Marshall Avenue, the road name changes to Lititz Pike and it fully enters Manheim Township, running through commercial areas as a five-lane road with a center left-turn lane. Northbound US 222 and PA 272 head northeast onto Oregon Pike, with PA 272 becoming signed again, while southbound US 222 and PA 501 continue north along Lititz Pike. The two routes continue northeast as a three-lane road with a center left-turn lane and runs past businesses and a few homes before it comes to an interchange with the US 30 freeway. Here, US 222 heads east along US 30 and PA 272 continues northeast along Oregon Pike, passing through commercial areas and narrowing to two lanes. The road continues through suburban areas of homes and businesses and passes through the community of Roseville. Farther northeast, the route widens to a divided highway at the Landis Valley Road intersection, where it passes to the southeast of the Landis Valley Museum in the community of Landis Valley. PA 272 becomes undivided again and passes through wooded residential areas before it enters farmland. The route becomes parallel to the US 222 freeway located to the southeast and reaches direct ramps to and from the southbound lanes of US 222. Access to and from the northbound lanes is provided by Jake Landis Road, which passes under US 222 and connects to Butter Road, which provides access to the ramps. The route heads through wooded areas and passes over Lititz Run before it comes to the eastern terminus of PA 722 near the community of Oregon.

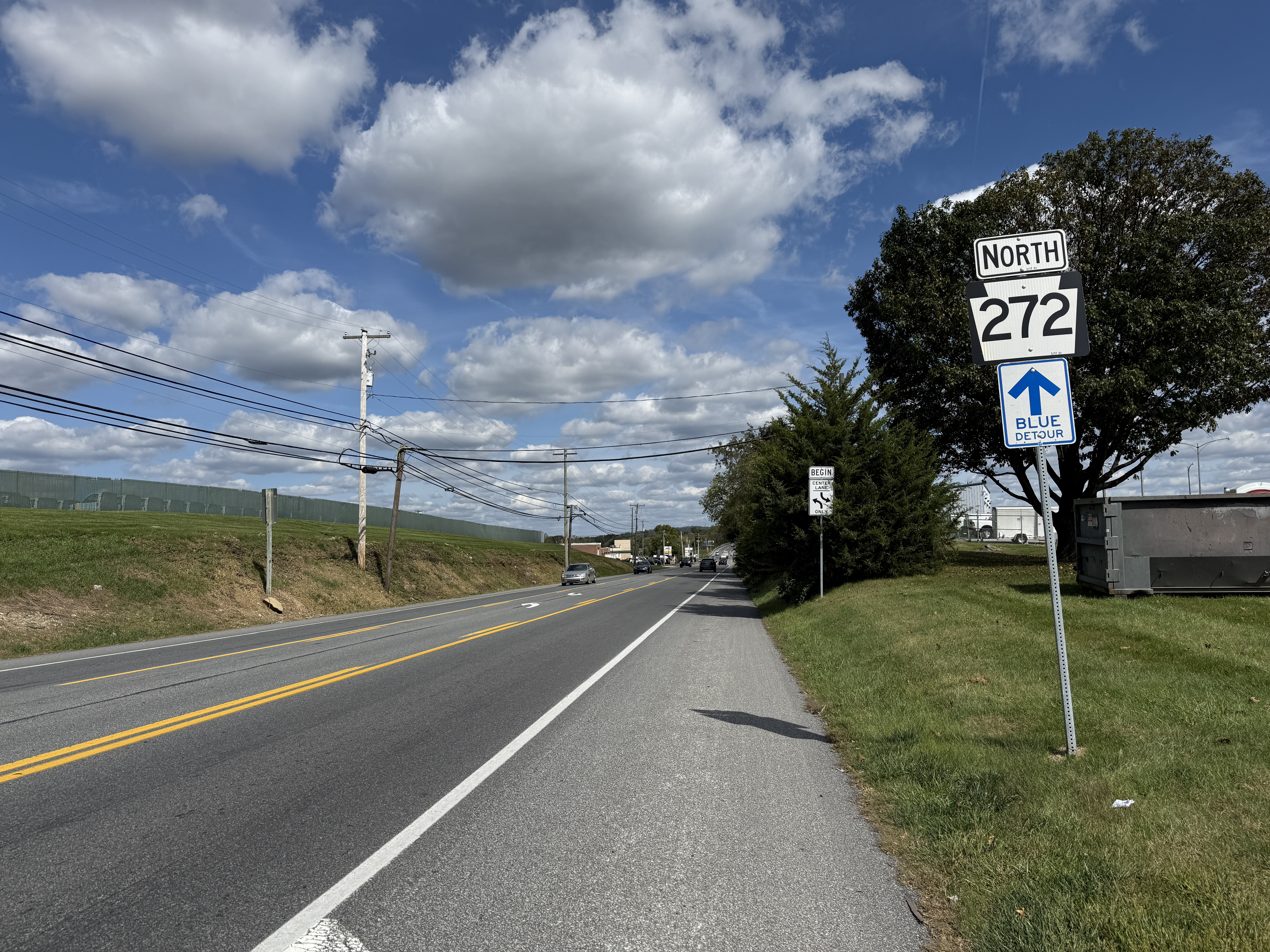
PA 272 northbound in Ephrata Township

The road heads into agricultural areas and enters Warwick Township prior to crossing Cocalico Creek into West Earl Township. The route heads through residential areas with some commercial development before it enters business areas, where it gains a center left-turn lane briefly before it becomes a divided highway and crosses PA 772 near Brownstown. Past this, PA 272 narrows back into a two-lane undivided road and runs through a mix of farm fields and commercial development, curving to the north. The road becomes the border between West Earl Township to the west and the borough of Akron to the east, running past homes and businesses. The route fully enters Akron and becomes South 7th Street, passing more development. PA 272 becomes North 7th Street upon crossing Main Street and continues through residential and commercial areas. The road passes through woods and leaves Akron, where it becomes the border between Ephrata Township to the west and the borough of Ephrata to the east, where the name changes to South Reading Road. The route passes over the Warwick to Ephrata Rail Trail and heads north-northeast through business areas, fully entering Ephrata and turning north. PA 272 crosses Cocalico Creek and curves northeast through a mix of homes and businesses. The road widens to a four-lane divided highway and reaches a cloverleaf interchange with US 322 north of the Ephrata Cloister. Past this, the route becomes North Reading Road and runs through business areas as a three-lane road with a center left-turn lane, passing to the north of WellSpan Ephrata Community Hospital. PA 272 continues through commercial areas as it forms the border between Ephrata Township to the northwest and the borough of Ephrata to the southeast.

The route fully enters Ephrata Township and narrows to a two-lane road as it runs through a mix of farmland and commercial development, passing over an East Penn Railroad line. The road crosses into East Cocalico Township and continues through agricultural areas with some homes and businesses, again crossing Cocalico Creek. PA 272 passes through the residential community of Reamstown, where it turns to the east. The route curves northeast past commercial development and comes to an intersection with Colonel Howard Boulevard, which heads east to provide access to the US 222 freeway and the Pennsylvania Turnpike (Interstate 76) at the Reading interchange. A short distance later, the road comes to a bridge over the Pennsylvania Turnpike. PA 272 gains a center left-turn lane and continues past businesses, eventually narrowing back to two lanes. The road passes more commercial development with some homes and crosses PA 897 in the community of Swartzville. Past this intersection, the route continues through developed areas and enters the borough of Adamstown. PA 272 heads through wooded areas with some homes and businesses as it passes through the borough. After leaving Adamstown, the road runs through a small corner of Brecknock Township. PA 272 enters Brecknock Township in Berks County and passes commercial development before it comes to its northern terminus at a partial cloverleaf interchange with the US 222 freeway. A park and ride lot is located at the southwest corner of this interchange. Past this interchange, the road continues east as PA 568.

== History ==
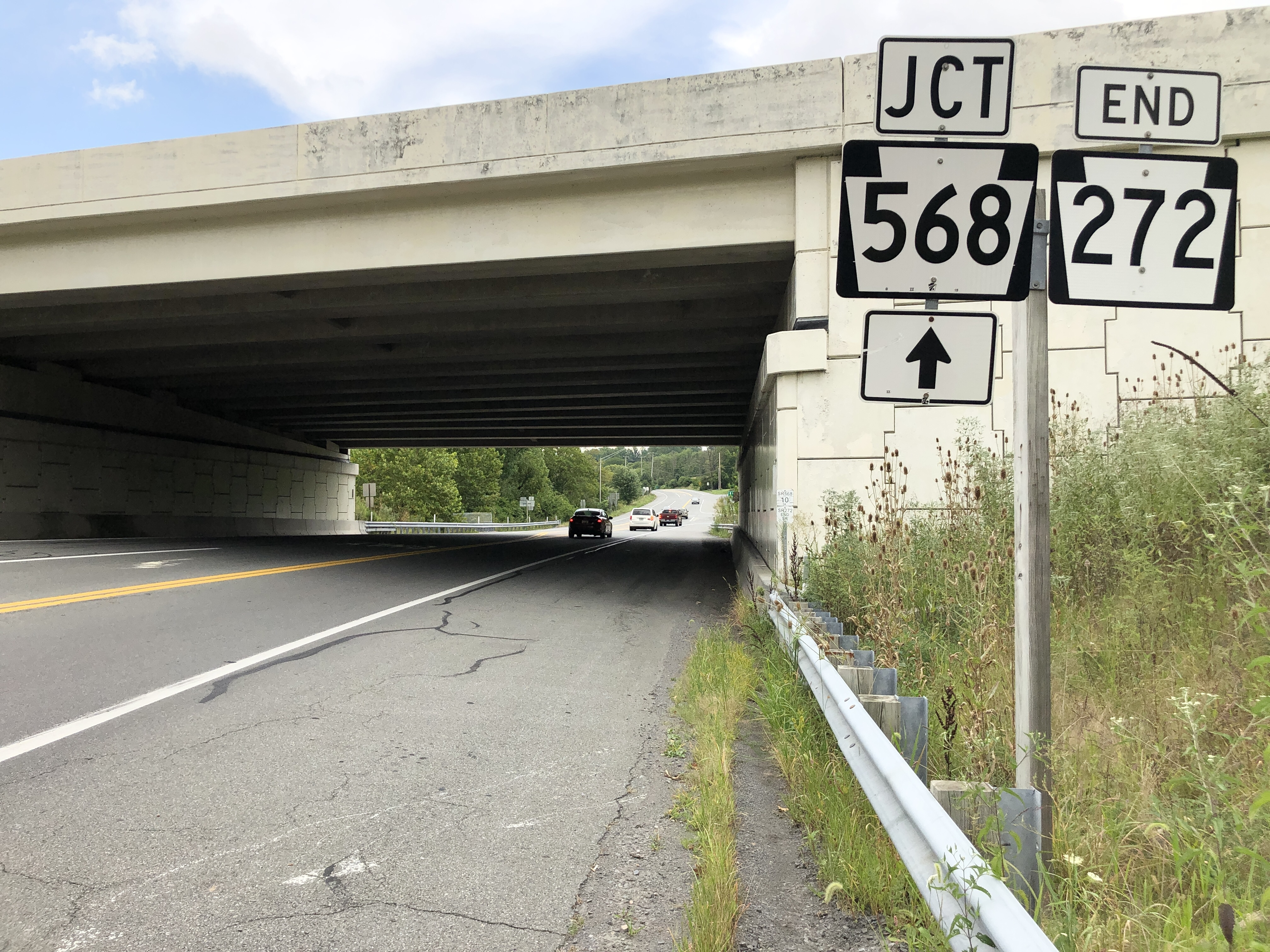
PA 272 northern terminus at US 222/PA 568 in Brecknock Township

The Willow Street Turnpike Road Company was chartered on April 5, 1849, to build a private turnpike between Willow Street and Lancaster. On March 25, 1850, the Lancaster and Ephrata Turnpike and Plank Road Company was charted to build a turnpike between Lancaster and Ephrata. This turnpike became known as the Oregon Turnpike. When Pennsylvania first legislated routes in 1911, the road between Willow Street and Lancaster was designated as part of Legislative Route 136 while the road between Brownstown and Adamstown served as part of Legislative Route 148, which connected Lancaster to Reading. With the establishment of the U.S. Highway System in 1926, the road between Willow Street and Lancaster became a part of US 230 while the road between Brownstown and Adamstown was a part of US 222. In 1927, PA 72 was designated concurrent with US 230 between Willow Street and Lancaster while PA 41 ran concurrent with US 222 between Brownstown and Adamstown.

PA 272 was designated in 1928 to run from US 222/PA 72 in Wakefield east to US 1/PA 12 (Baltimore Pike) in Nottingham, with the road unpaved in Lancaster County and paved in Chester County. Also, the road between the Maryland border and Chrome became the southernmost portion of PA 42. At this time, US 222 replaced the US 230 designation south of Lancaster and PA 240 replaced the PA 41 designation along US 222 between Brownstown and Adamstown. By 1930, PA 272 was paved between PA 172 in Little Britain and the Octoraro Creek. In addition, PA 722 was designated onto the Oregon Pike between Oregon and Brownstown while the concurrent state route designations were removed from US 222. In the 1930s, PA 272 was paved between Wakefield and Little Britain. Also, a southern extension of PA 72 was designated onto the straight road between Wakefield and Willow Street. US 222 was also realigned to use Oregon Pike between Lancaster and Brownstown, replacing the easternmost portion of PA 722. US 222 was also moved to a new alignment between Ephrata and Reamstown in 1944, having previously followed State Street and Reamstown Road. This new alignment included an interchange with US 322. PA 272 was extended south from Nottingham to the Maryland border in the 1940s, replacing the southernmost section of PA 42.

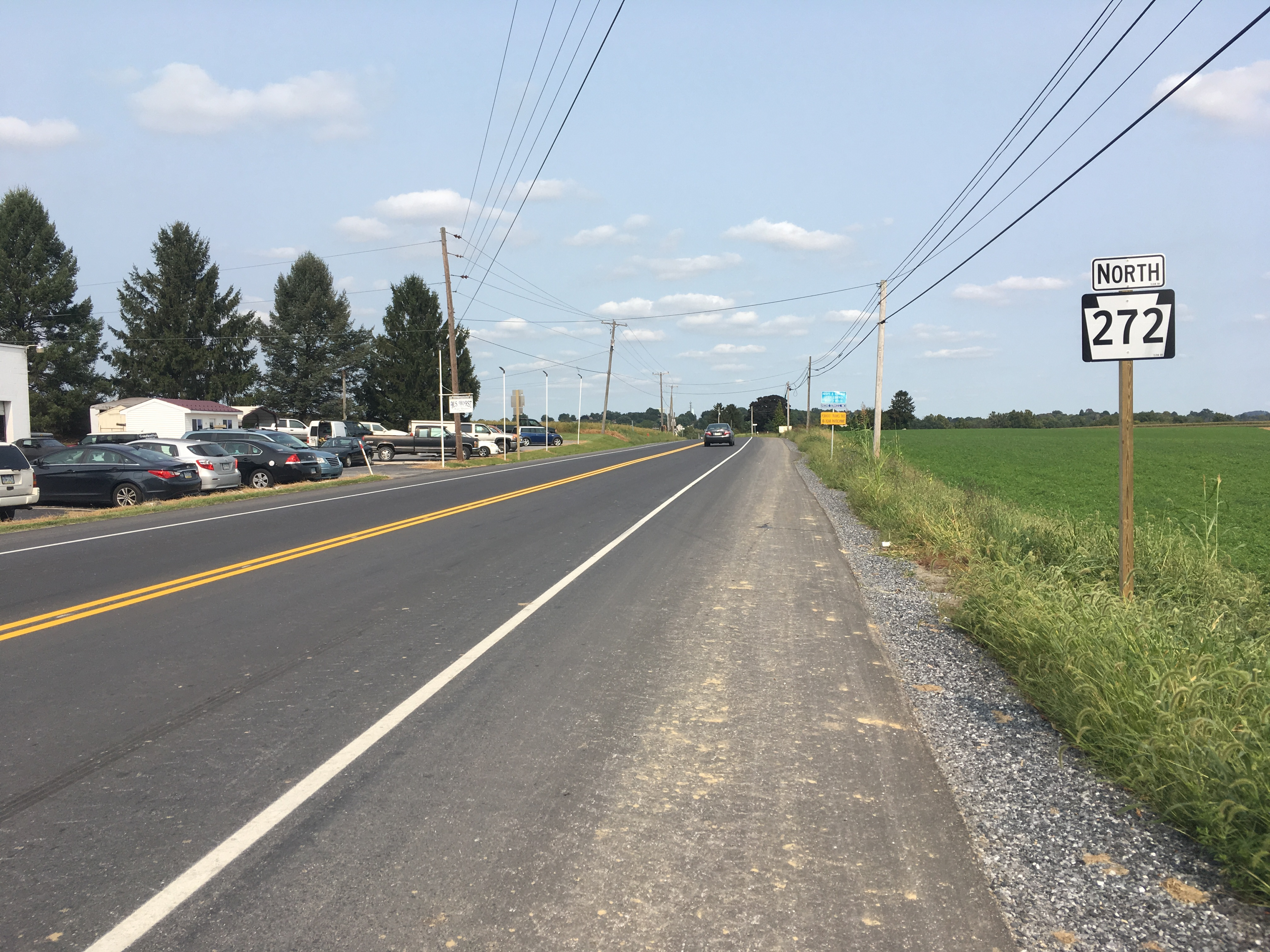
PA 272 northbound past Bushong Road in Manheim Township

In the 1960s, PA 272 was extended north from Wakefield to US 222 in Willow Street, replacing the section of PA 72 between Wakefield and Willow Street. Also, the route was widened to a divided highway between Smithville and Willow Street. In July 1977, the US 222 freeway was completed between Lancaster and the Berks County border near Adamstown. As a result, PA 272 was extended north from Willow Street to run concurrent with US 222 through Lancaster before following the former surface alignment of US 222 between Lancaster and Adamstown, ending at an intersection with US 222 and PA 568. In 2006, the intersection with US 222 and PA 568 at the northern terminus was replaced with an interchange as part of upgrading US 222 to a freeway between Adamstown and Reading.

In March 2013, construction began on a new bridge to carry US 222/PA 272 over the Amtrak tracks in Lancaster. The bridge project cost $26.6 million, with $12.7 million of that figure the actual construction costs of the bridge. The new bridge, which is four lanes wide and connects Lititz Pike directly with North Duke Street, opened to traffic on July 9, 2014, with the old bridge closed and later demolished. The bridge carrying US 222/PA 272 over the Amtrak line was named the Thaddeus Stevens Bridge in honor of Thaddeus Stevens, a 19th-century abolitionist and United States Representative who was from Lancaster. Concurrent with the construction of the new bridge, McGovern Avenue was converted to a two-way road between North Queen Street and North Duke Street to provide improved access to Lancaster station.

== Major intersections ==
County	Location	mi	km	Destinations	Notes
Chester	East Nottingham Township	0.000	0.000	MD 272 south (Chrome Road)	Continuation into Maryland
Chester	West Nottingham Township	3.335	5.367	US 1 (Kennett–Oxford Bypass) – Rising Sun, Baltimore, Oxford	Interchange
Lancaster	Fulton Township	12.584	20.252	US 222 south (Robert Fulton Highway) – Maryland	Southern end of US 222 concurrency
Lancaster	Fulton Township	13.055	21.010	US 222 north (Robert Fulton Highway) – Quarryville	Northern end of US 222 concurrency
Lancaster	Drumore–East Drumore township line	19.982	32.158	PA 372 west (Holtwood Road) – Holtwood	Southern end of PA 372 concurrency
Lancaster	Drumore–East Drumore township line	20.221	32.543	PA 372 east (Buck Road) – Quarryville	Northern end of PA 372 concurrency
Lancaster	West Lampeter Township	28.667	46.135	US 222 south / PA 741 (Long Lane / Beaver Valley Pike) – New Danville, Quarryville	Southern end of US 222 concurrency; southern terminus of unsigned section
Lancaster	Lancaster Township–Lancaster line	31.478	50.659	PA 324 south (New Danville Pike)	No direct northbound access; northern terminus of PA 324
Lancaster	Lancaster	32.195	51.813	PA 72 north (South Queen Street)	No southbound access; southern terminus of PA 72 northbound
Lancaster	Lancaster	32.614	52.487	PA 462 east (King Street)	
Lancaster	Lancaster	32.832	52.838	PA 23 east (Chestnut Street)	
Lancaster	Lancaster	32.941	53.013	PA 23 west / PA 462 west (Walnut Street)	
Lancaster	Lancaster–Manheim Township line	33.697	54.230	PA 72 north (North Prince Street) – Manheim, Lebanon	No direct northbound access; southern terminus of PA 72 southbound
Lancaster	Manheim Township	34.326	55.242	PA 501 north (Lititz Pike) – Lititz	Southern terminus of PA 501; northern terminus of unsigned section
Lancaster	Manheim Township	34.767	55.952	US 30 / US 222 north to PA 283 west / PA 501 – York, Harrisburg, Reading, Philadelphia	Interchange; northern end of US 222 concurrency
Lancaster	Manheim Township	38.145– 38.426	61.388– 61.841	US 222 south	Interchange
Lancaster	Manheim Township	38.421	61.833	To US 222 north	Access via Jake Landis Road
Lancaster	Manheim Township	39.349	63.326	PA 722 west (East Oregon Road)	Eastern terminus of PA 722
Lancaster	West Earl Township	41.154	66.231	PA 772 (Newport Road) to US 222 – Lititz, Brownstown, Leola	
Lancaster	Ephrata	45.385	73.040	US 322 (West Main Street) – Ephrata, Brickerville, Lebanon	Cloverleaf interchange
Lancaster	East Cocalico Township	50.929	81.962	To I-76 Toll / Penna Turnpike / US 222	Access via Colonel Howard Boulevard
Lancaster	East Cocalico Township	52.173	83.964	PA 897 (Swartzville Road) – Schaefferstown, Terre Hill	
Berks	Brecknock Township	54.666	87.976	US 222 – Reading, Lancaster	Interchange
Berks	Brecknock Township	54.666	87.976	PA 568 east (Alleghenyville Road) – Knauers	Continuation east
1.000 mi = 1.609 km; 1.000 km = 0.621 mi: Concurrency terminus; Incomplete access
