= Little Britain, Pennsylvania =

Unincorporated community in Pennsylvania, US

- Census-designated place
- Location within Pennsylvania Location within the United States
- Country: United States
- State: Pennsylvania
- County: Lancaster
- Township: Little Britain

Area
  - Total: 1.45 sq mi (3.76 km^{2})
  - Land: 1.45 sq mi (3.75 km^{2})
  - Water: 0.0039 sq mi (0.01 km^{2})
- Elevation: 460 ft (140 m)

Population (2020)
  - Total: 406
  - Density: 280.2/sq mi (108.17/km^{2})
- Time zone: UTC-5 (Eastern (EST))
  - Summer (DST): UTC-4 (EDT)
- FIPS code: 42-43828
- GNIS feature ID: 1179481

Little Britain is an unincorporated community and census-designated place (CDP) in Little Britain Township, Lancaster County, Pennsylvania, United States. At the 2010 census, the population was 372.

== Geography ==
Little Britain is in far southern Lancaster County, in the center of Little Britain Township. Pennsylvania Route 272 (Nottingham Road) passes through the center of the community, leading northwest 23 miles (37 km) to Lancaster, the county seat, and southeast 6 miles (10 km) to Nottingham in Chester County.

According to the U.S. Census Bureau, the Little Britain CDP has a total area of 1.5 square miles (3.8 km^{2}), of which 1.7 acres (6,889 m^{2}), or 0.18%, are water. The community drains west to Little Conowingo Creek, a tributary of Conowingo Creek, and south via Reynolds Run to Octoraro Creek. Conowingo and Octoraro creeks are both southwest-flowing tributaries of the Susquehanna River, joining the river in Maryland.

== Demographics ==
Historical population
Census	Pop.	Note	%±
2020	406		—
U.S. Decennial Census
