= Peach Bottom, Pennsylvania =

Unincorporated community in Pennsylvania, US

- Unincorporated community
- Location within Pennsylvania
- Coordinates: 39°45′03″N 76°13′33″W
- Country: United States
- State: Pennsylvania
- County: Lancaster
- Township: Fulton
- Elevation: 141 ft (43 m)
- Time zone: UTC-5 (Eastern (EST))
  - Summer (DST): UTC-4 (EDT)
- ZIP code: 17563
- Area code: 717
- GNIS feature ID: 1183417

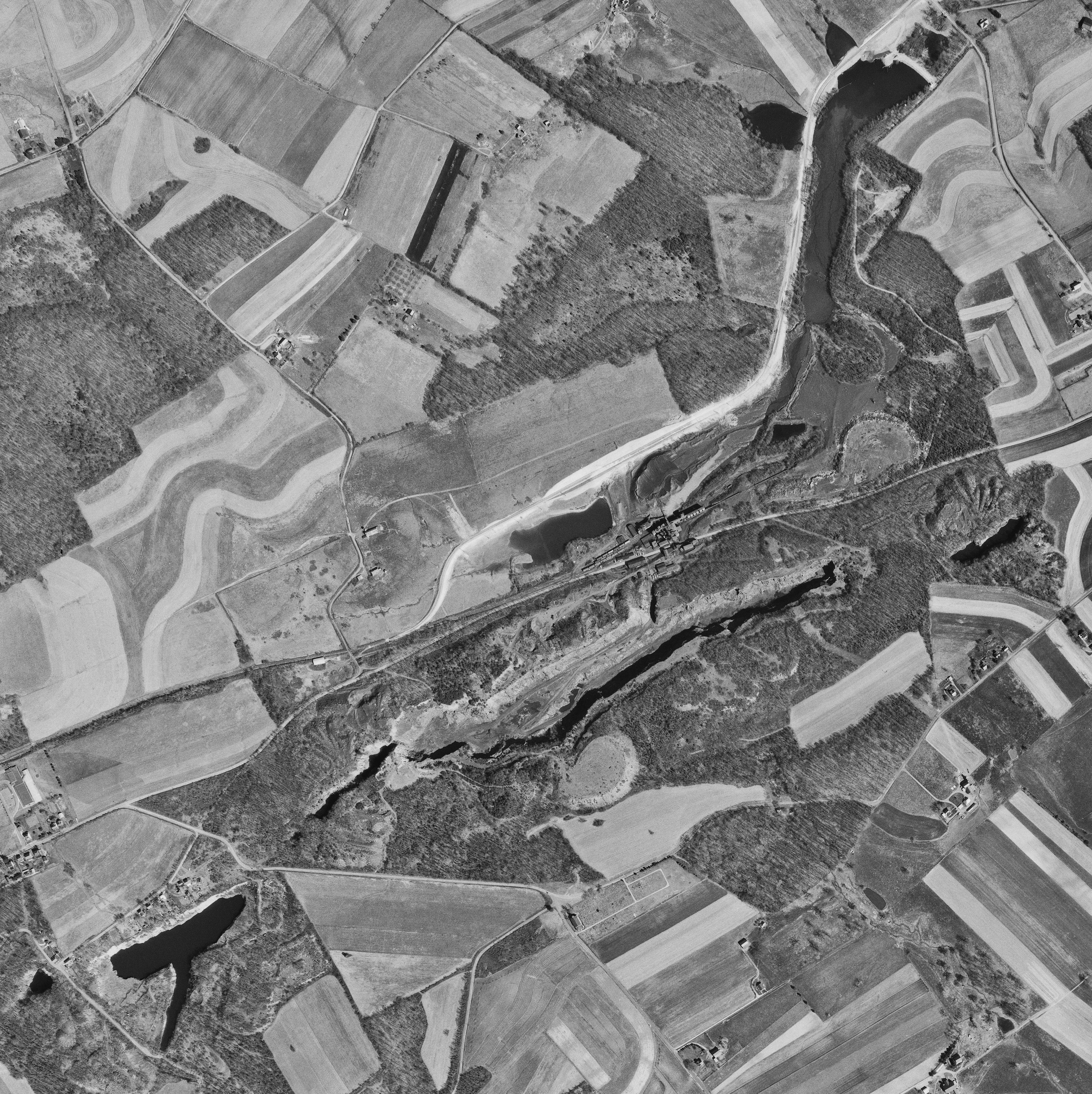
Peach Bottom Slate quarries in 1969, about a year before the Funkhouser Quarry closed permanently

Peach Bottom is an unincorporated village in Fulton Township, Lancaster County, in the state of Pennsylvania, United States. It lies on the east bank of the Susquehanna River.

The original town of Peach Bottom was located across the river in York County. With the construction of the Columbia and Port Deposit Railroad up the east side of the Susquehanna (1866–1868), a station was built on the Lancaster County side, near the mouth of Peters Creek, from which Peach Bottom could be reached by ferry. This was known as Peach Bottom Station.

The Peach Bottom Railway had terminals at both Peach Bottom and Peach Bottom Station; a planned bridge to connect them was never built. The line on the east side became the Lancaster, Oxford and Southern Railroad and on the west side, the Maryland and Pennsylvania Railroad.

When the Conowingo Dam was built (1926–1928), the Columbia and Port Deposit was relocated higher up the hillside, and both Peach Bottom and Peach Bottom Station were submerged. The present village was built a short distance southeast of the site of Peach Bottom Station.

The post office for the area (ZIP code 17563) is named "Peach Bottom" but is located on Pennsylvania Route 272 just north of Wakefield.

The Peach Bottom Nuclear Generating Station lies across the river, on the site of the original town. In 2016, the U.S. Nuclear Regulatory Commission (NRC) estimated that a major fire at the spent fuel pool at the Peach Bottom Nuclear Generating Station would displace an estimated 3.46 million people from 31,000 square kilometers of contaminated land, while a study conducted at Princeton University suggested that the number of displaced people could go as high as 18.1 million people. An earlier study from 1975 assessed the nuclear station's ecological impact on fish fauna along the Susquehanna River.

== Notable residents ==
- Bryan Cutler, State Speaker, Pennsylvania House Representatives
- Andrew L. Drummond, Chief of the United States Secret Service from 1891 to 1894
- Christopher McDougall, writer and journalist, author of Born to Run: A Hidden Tribe, Superathletes, and the Greatest Race the World Has Never Seen (2009)
