= Conowingo Creek =

Stream in the US states of Pennsylvania and Maryland

Coordinates: 39.682329°N 76.196899°W

Conowingo Creek is a 20.2-mile-long (32.5 km) tributary of the Susquehanna River in Lancaster County, Pennsylvania, and Cecil County, Maryland.

The name of the creek comes from the Lenape, meaning "at the rapids".

It originates near the northern border of East Drumore Township and flows south, meeting Jackson Run near the southern border. It enters Fulton Township just above the birthplace of Robert Fulton, for whom the township is named. Flowing along the east side of Wakefield, it meets Little Conowingo Creek below the town, and begins to flow through hillier terrain before entering Maryland. Its valley soon deepens into a gorge as it approaches the Susquehanna. It empties into the Conowingo Reservoir at Pilot Station.

== See also ==
- List of rivers of Maryland
- List of rivers of Pennsylvania
