= Little Britain Township, Pennsylvania =

Township in Pennsylvania, US

Coordinates: 39°44′30″N 76°07′35″W

- Township
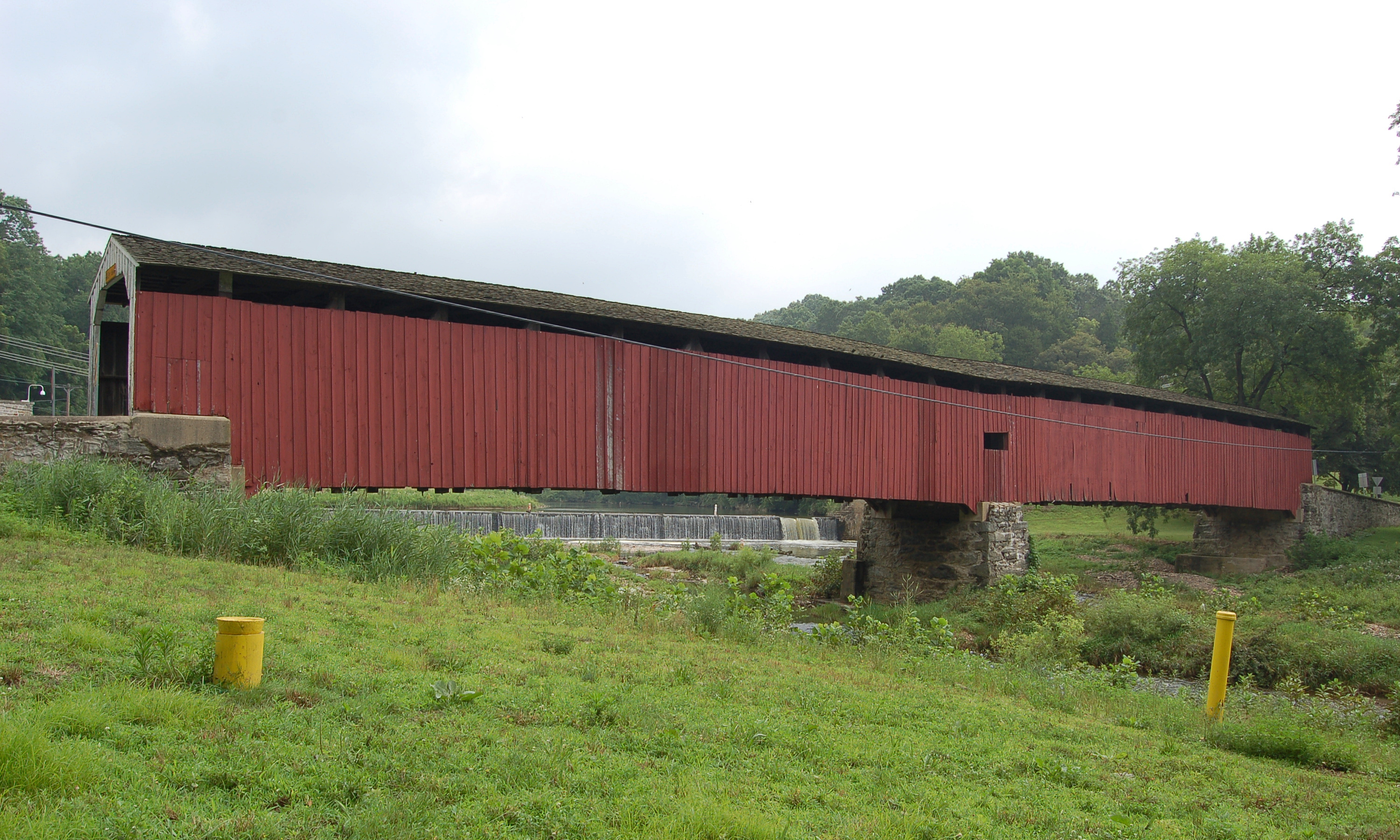
- Pine Grove Covered Bridge (1884); National Register of Historic Places

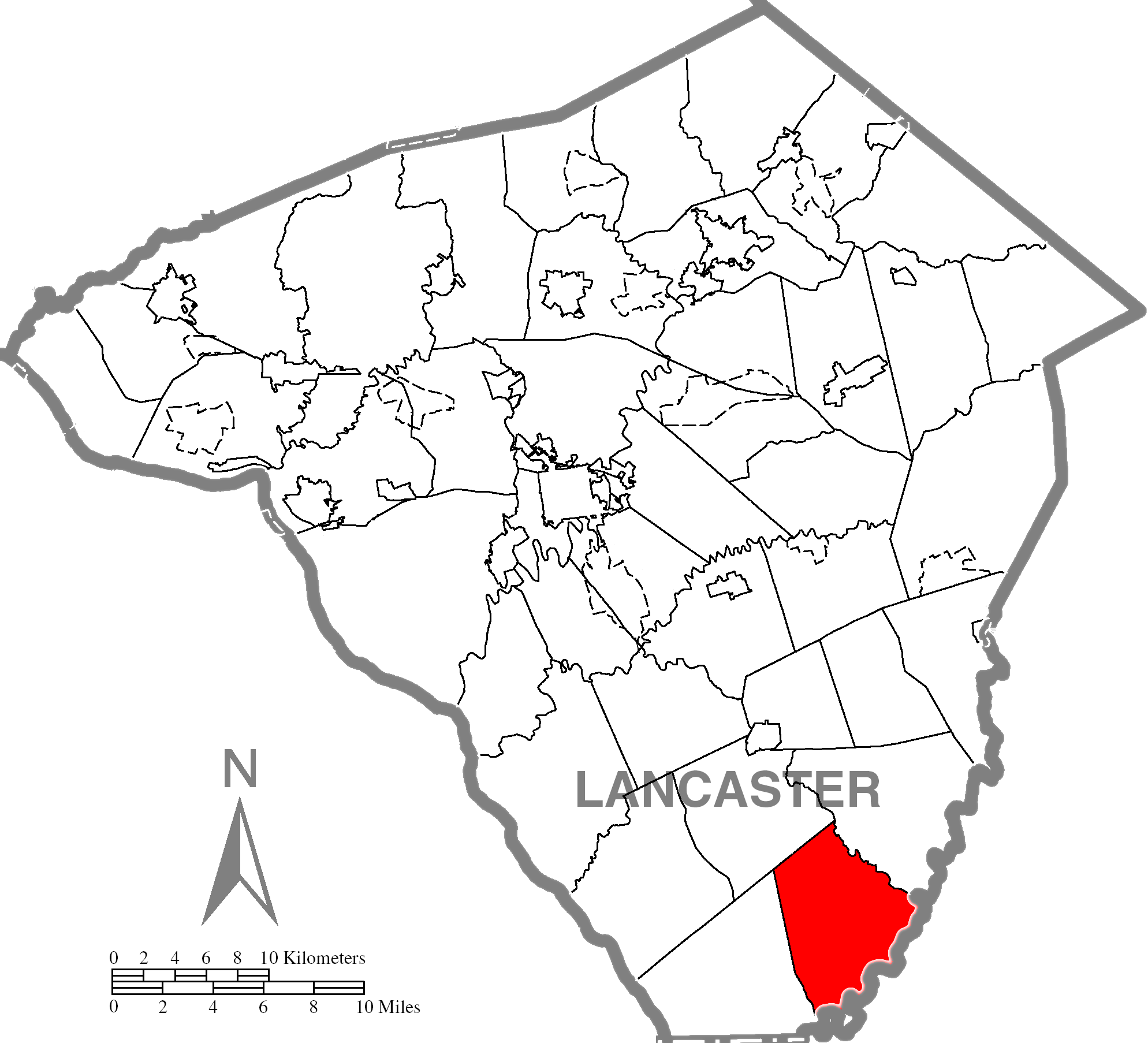
- Map of Lancaster County, Pennsylvania highlighting Little Britain Township

- Map of Lancaster County, Pennsylvania
- Country: United States
- State: Pennsylvania
- County: Lancaster
- Settled: 1714
- Incorporated: 1738

Government
  - Type: Board of Supervisors

Area
  - Total: 27.54 sq mi (71.32 km^{2})
  - Land: 27.24 sq mi (70.55 km^{2})
  - Water: 0.30 sq mi (0.77 km^{2})

Population (2020)
  - Total: 4,134 ▲
  - Estimate (2021): 4,148
  - Density: 155.1/sq mi (59.88/km^{2})
- Time zone: UTC-5 (Eastern (EST))
  - Summer (DST): UTC-4 (EDT)
- Area code: 717
- FIPS code: 42-071-43832
- Website: www.littlebritain.org

Historical population
Census	Pop.	Note	%±
2000	3,514		—
2010	4,106		16.8%
2020	4,134		0.7%
2021 (est.)	4,148		0.3%
U.S. Decennial Census

Little Britain Township is a township in southeastern Lancaster County, Pennsylvania, United States. The population was 4,134 at the 2020 census. It is part of the Solanco School District.

== History ==
On February 7, 1738, a petition was signed by many citizens of Drumore Township, Pennsylvania to create a new township, due to Drumore getting too big. They had a hard time thinking of a new name, though finally John Jamison, one of the oldest and most prominent citizens, proposed that it be called Little Britain Township in memory of most of the settlers' mother country. For over one hundred years, Little Britain Township's boundaries remained unchanged, until 1844 when Fulton Township was formed. Although Robert Fulton, credited with the development of the steamship, was born in Little Britain, his birthplace is within the border of present-day Fulton Township.

The Kirks Mills Historic District and Pine Grove Covered Bridge are listed on the National Register of Historic Places.

== Geography ==
According to the United States Census Bureau, the township has a total area of 27.5 square miles (71 km^{2}), of which 27.4 square miles (71 km^{2}) is land and 0.2 square miles (0.52 km^{2}) (0.54%) is water. It includes the unincorporated communities of Little Britain, Kings Bridge, Fairmount, White Rock, Oak Shade, Tayloria, Pine Grove, Oak Hill, Oakryn, Summerhill, Kirks Bridge, Kirks Mills, Eastland, and part of Wrightsdale.

== Demographics ==
As of the census of 2000, there were 3,514 people, 1,115 households, and 931 families residing in the township. The population density was 128.3 inhabitants per square mile (49.5/km^{2}). There were 1,156 housing units at an average density of 42.2 per square mile (16.3/km^{2}). The racial makeup of the township was 98.12% White, 0.65% African American, 0.03% Native American, 0.23% Asian, 0.11% from other races, and 0.85% from two or more races. Hispanic or Latino of any race were 1.20% of the population.

There were 1,115 households, out of which 44.5% had children under the age of 18 living with them, 73.5% were married couples living together, 5.5% had a female householder with no husband present, and 16.5% were non-families. 13.3% of all households were made up of individuals, and 4.9% had someone living alone who was 65 years of age or older. The average household size was 3.15 and the average family size was 3.47.

In the township the population was spread out, with 33.7% under the age of 18, 8.0% from 18 to 24, 28.8% from 25 to 44, 21.1% from 45 to 64, and 8.3% who were 65 years of age or older. The median age was 32 years. For every 100 females, there were 100.9 males. For every 100 females age 18 and over, there were 100.5 males.

The median income for a household in the township was $50,017, and the median income for a family was $51,549. Males had a median income of $42,063 versus $25,694 for females. The per capita income for the township was $18,563. About 8.8% of families and 13.6% of the population were below the poverty line, including 19.5% of those under age 18 and 2.7% of those age 65 or over.

== Politics ==
As of the 2024 election, no Democratic Party nominee for president has ever won Little Britain, dating back to Andrew Jackson's second campaign, in 1828. Every presidential ticket nominated by the GOP has carried Little Britain, Pennsylvania, with six of the last seven tickets winning the township with over 70% of the vote. Six of the seven Whig tickets carried the town as well, with that party not being put on the ballot in Pennsylvania in 1832. The Anti-Masonic party nominee William Wirt won the township in that election.

The best showing by a Republican to date is Herbert Hoover in 1928. The best showing by a Democrat is the 48.99% won by Winfield S. Hancock in 1880. He lost by eight votes. In 1856, Lancaster native James Buchanan was the Democratic nominee and received 39.94% of the vote.

Presidential election results since 1812, except for 1820, are all presented below:

Little Britain township vote by party in presidential elections
Year	Democratic	Republican	Third Parties
2024	22.29% 403	77.05% 1,393	0.66% 12
2020	23.38% 300	75.50% 1,279	1.12% 19
2016	22.80% 342	72.67% 1,090	4.53% 67
2012	27.54% 382	71.02% 985	1.44% 20
2008	30.84% 433	68.02% 955	1.14% 16
2004	26.90% 368	72.30% 989	0.80% 11
2000	26.62% 280	71.39% 751	2.00% 21
1996	25.93% 223	60.23% 518	13.84% 119
1992	22.76% 180	53.48% 423	23.77% 188
1988	23.78% 146	76.22% 468	0.00% 0
1984	21.43% 135	77.94% 491	0.63% 4
1980	25.59% 141	69.51% 383	4.90% 27
1976	36.70% 178	61.86% 300	1.44% 7
1972	21.83% 98	76.17% 342	2.00% 9
1968	19.31% 117	50.17% 304	30.53% 185
1964	48.30% 241	51.70% 258	0.00% 0
1960	31.03% 157	68.97% 349	0.00% 0
1956	33.40% 157	66.60% 313	0.00% 0
1952	28.29% 131	71.71% 332	0.00% 0
1948	29.47% 112	69.21% 263	1.32% 5
1944	33.41% 154	66.59% 307	0.00% 0
1940	43.98% 219	56.02% 279	0.00% 0
1936	46.61% 254	53.39% 291	0.29% 1
1932	47.75% 180	51.99% 196	0.27% 1
1928	21.69% 77	78.31% 278	0.00% 0
1924	20.52% 71	75.72% 262	3.76% 13
1920	33.16% 128	62.18% 240	4.66% 18
1916	40.83% 118	56.40% 163	2.77% 8
1912	38.18% 113	42.57% 126	19.26% 57
1908	38.77% 126	59.69% 194	1.54% 5
1904	37.05% 113	61.31% 187	2.62% 8
1900	38.64% 131	61.06% 207	0.29% 1
1896	44.27% 170	54.43% 209	1.30% 5
1892	46.69% 169	51.66% 187	1.66% 6
1888	45.56% 190	51.56% 215	2.88% 12
1884	48.38% 194	49.88% 200	1.75% 7
1880	48.99% 193	51.02% 201	0.00% 0
1876	43.52% 151	56.48% 196	0.00% 0
1872	38.55% 106	60.73% 167	0.73% 2
1868	41.42% 152	58.58% 215	0.00% 0
1864	46.95% 154	53.05% 174	0.00% 0
1860	30.30% 100	64.24% 212	5.45% 18
1856	39.94% 127	44.65% 142	15.41% 49
1852	31.58% 96	63.16% 192	4.61% 14
1848	26.73% 81	63.04% 191	10.23% 31
1844	27.68% 75	72.32% 196	0.00% 0
1840	27.92% 146	72.08% 377	0.00% 0
1836	26.94% 104	73.06% 282	0.00% 0
1832	26.45% 91	73.55% 253	0.00% 0
1828	44.97% 143	55.03% 175	0.00% 0
1824	69.23% 36	30.77% 16	0.00% 0
1816	37.82% 45	62.18% 74	0.00% 0
1812	30.47% 78	69.53% 178	0.00% 0
