= Kirks Mills Historic District =

Historic district in Pennsylvania, United States

- U.S. National Register of Historic Places
- U.S. Historic district
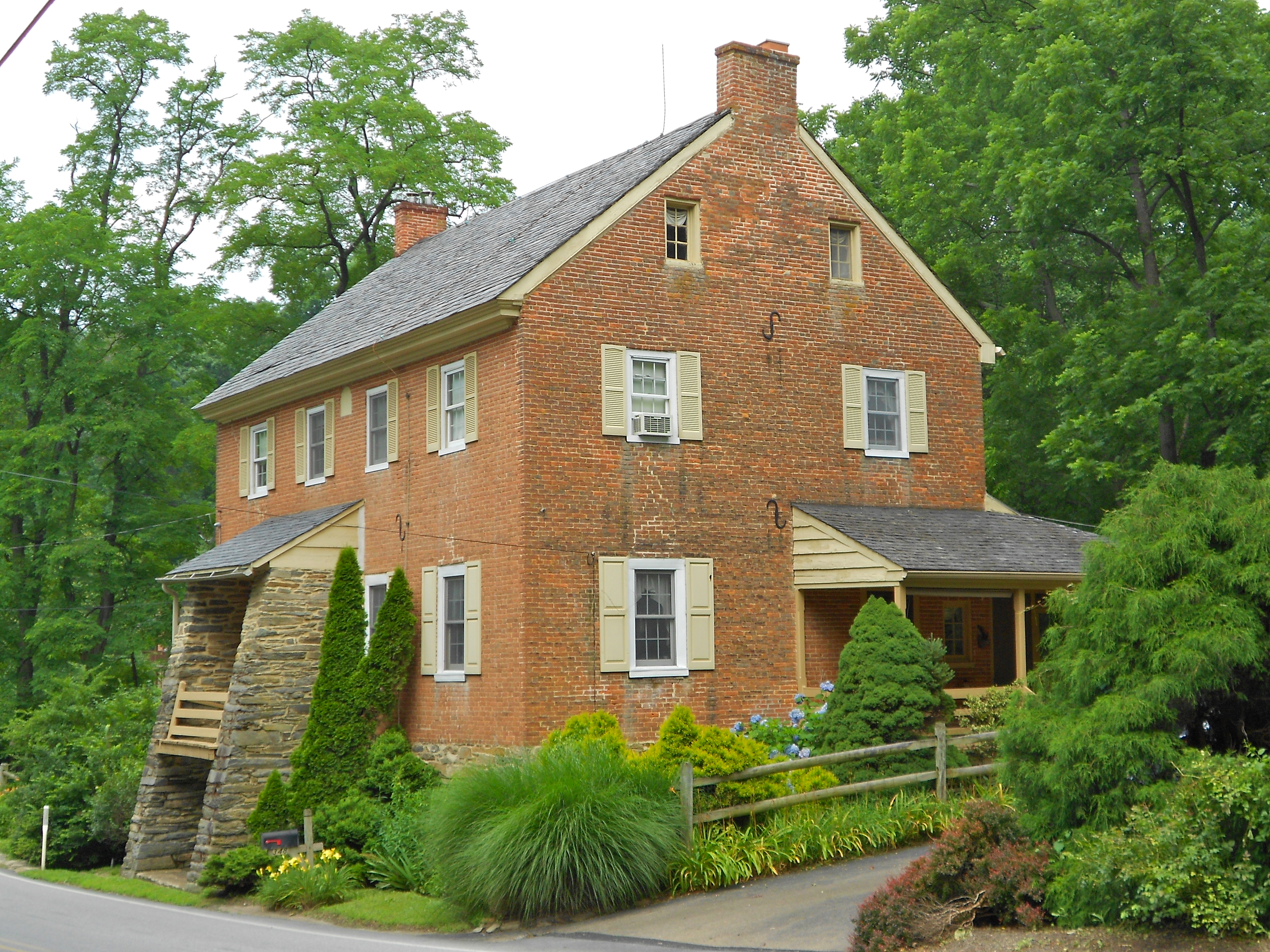
- The Brick Mill

- Location within Pennsylvania Location within the United States
- Location: West of Nottingham, Chester County off Pennsylvania Route 272, Little Britain Township, Pennsylvania
- Coordinates: 39°45′11″N 76°06′27″W
- Area: 210 acres (85 ha)
- Built by: Lynch, Ephriam
- Architectural style: Late Victorian, Federal
- NRHP reference No.: 78002420
- Added to NRHP: July 17, 1978

The Kirks Mills Historic District is a national historic district that is located in Little Britain Township, Lancaster County, Pennsylvania, United States.

It was listed on the National Register of Historic Places in 1978.

== History and architectural features ==
This district includes twelve contributing buildings that are located in the village of Kirks Mills. Those buildings are: Jacob Kirk's Mansion House (c. 1752), the Brick Mill/Kirk's Mill (c. 1810), the brick miller's house, a stone and log barn that was converted to a residence in 1975, Joseph Reynold's House (1825), Eastland Friends Meeting and Tenant House (c. 1798, 1822), the Ephriam B. Lynch House (1880s), the Harry Reynolds House (c. 1774), the Manuel Reynolds House, the Eastland School House (1838), and the Log House.

Jacob Kirk's Mansion House is a three-story, brick dwelling with a two-story ell. It features a full porch on the front and right sides. Kirk's Mill is a 2 1/2-story brick building with a slate gable roof. It was remodeled to a residence about 1940.

== Gallery ==
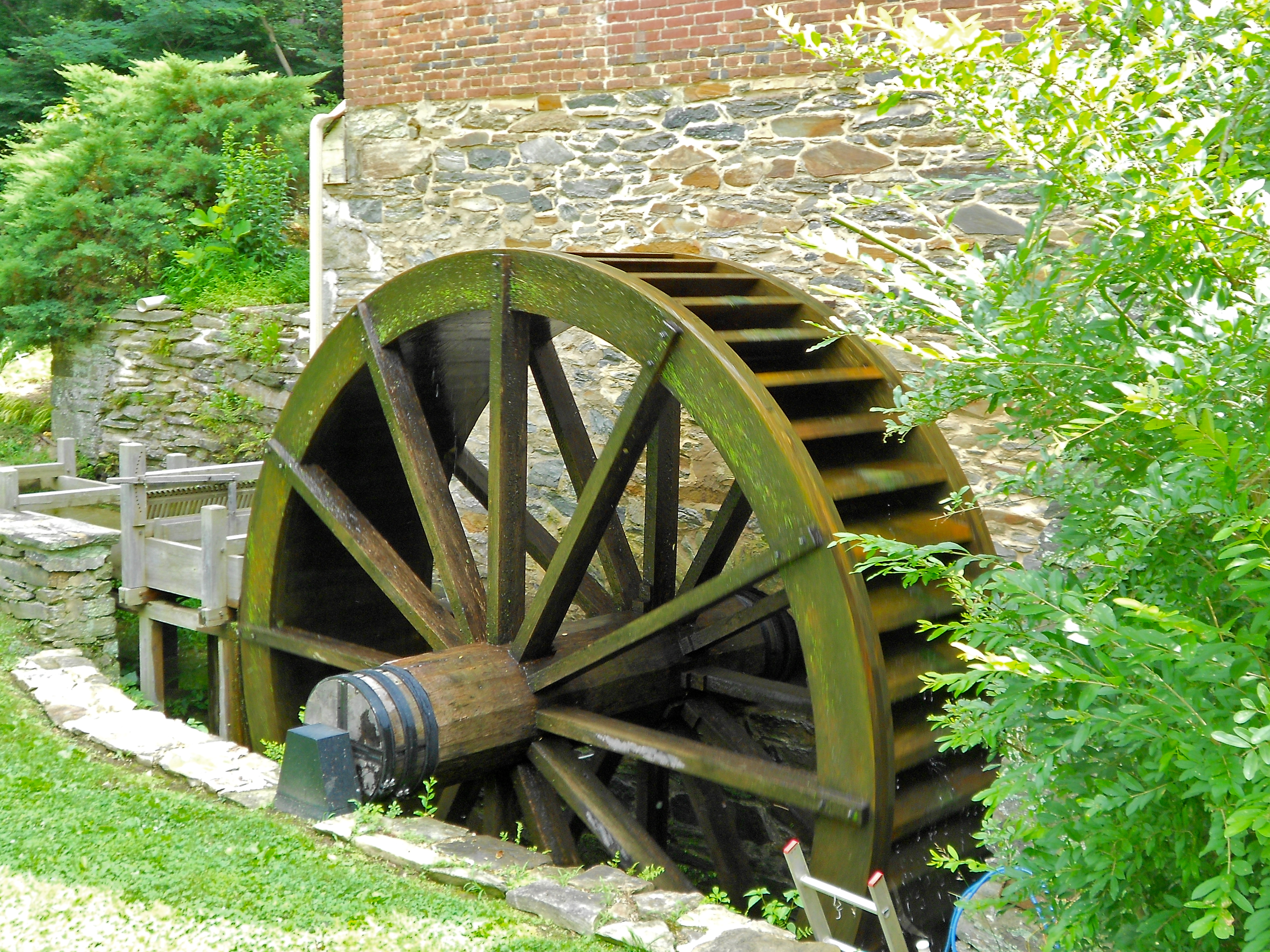
Water wheel

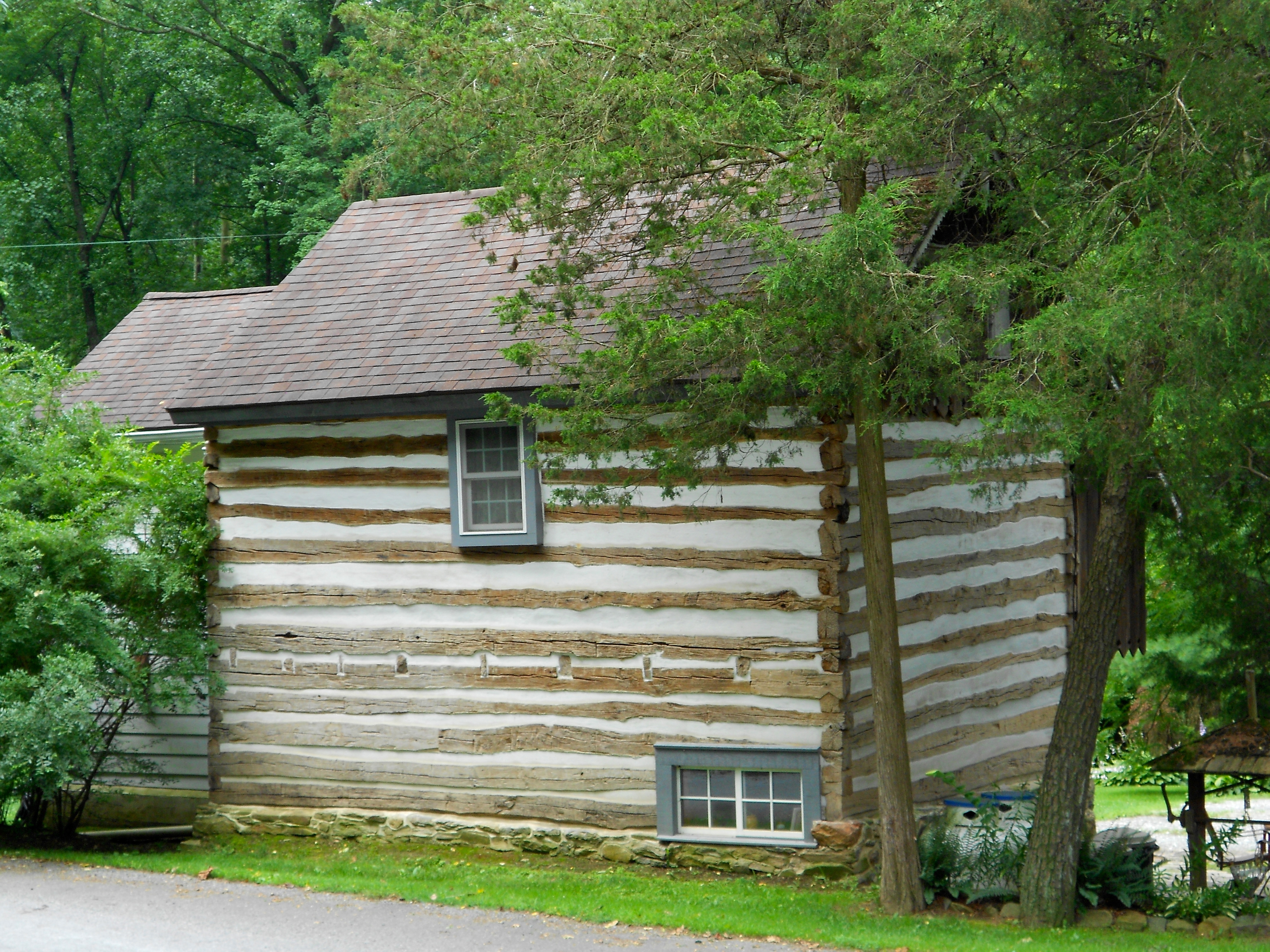
Swisser log barn

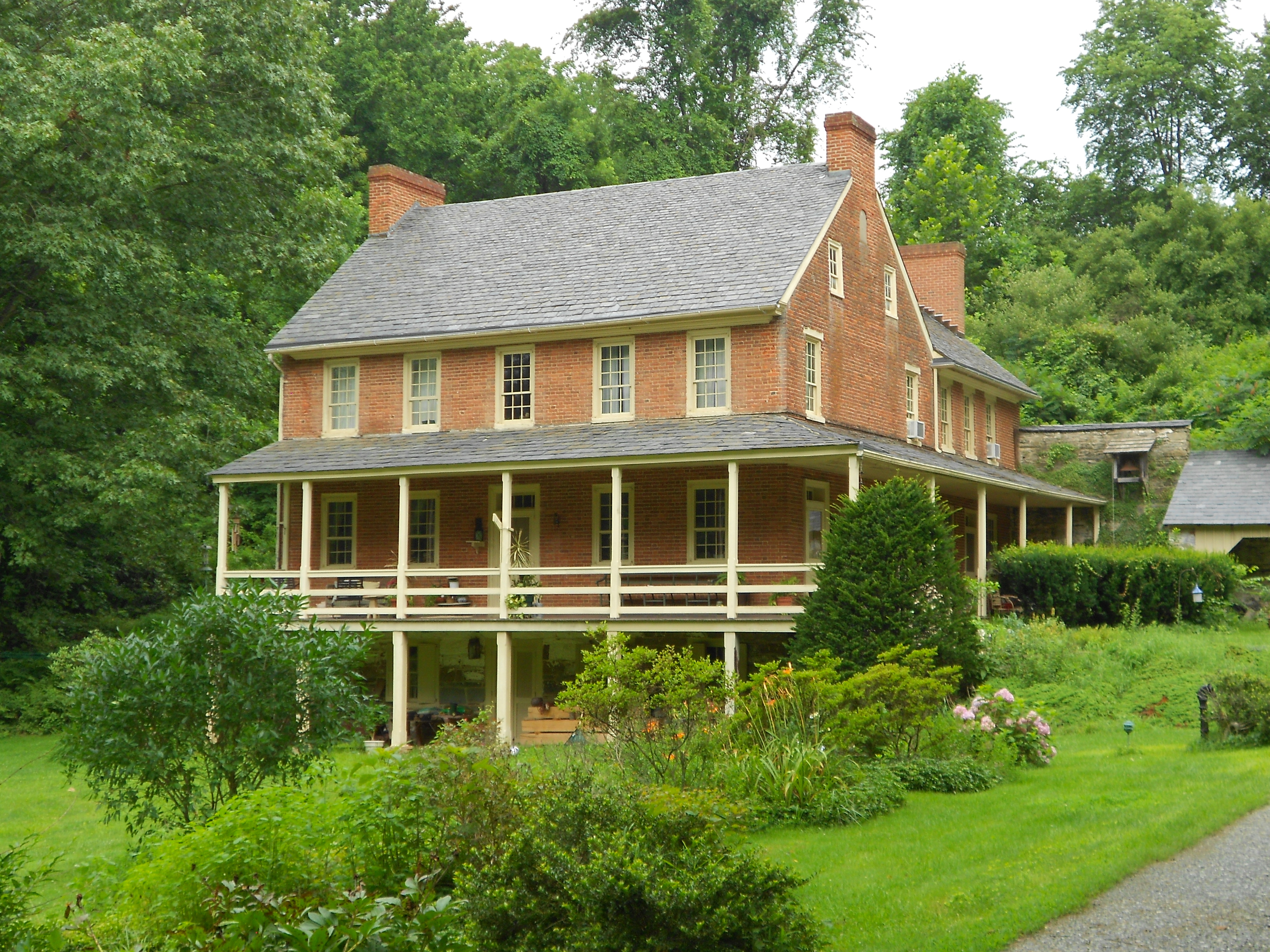
Jacob Kirk Mansion
