= Wakefield, Pennsylvania =

Unincorporated community in Pennsylvania, US

- Census-designated place
- Location in Pennsylvania Location in the United States
- Coordinates: 39°46′25″N 76°10′45″W
- Country: United States
- State: Pennsylvania
- County: Lancaster
- Township: Fulton

Area
  - Total: 1.71 sq mi (4.44 km^{2})
  - Land: 1.70 sq mi (4.41 km^{2})
  - Water: 0.0077 sq mi (0.02 km^{2})
- Elevation: 395 ft (120 m)

Population (2010)
  - Total: 609
  - Density: 360/sq mi (138/km^{2})
- Time zone: UTC-5 (Eastern (EST))
  - Summer (DST): UTC-4 (EDT)
- ZIP code: 17563 (as Peach Bottom)
- Area code: 717
- FIPS code: 42-80480
- GNIS feature ID: 1190487

Wakefield is an unincorporated community and census-designated place (CDP) within Fulton Township, Pennsylvania, United States. As of the 2010 census, the population was 609. It is the largest community within the "Peach Bottom" ZIP code, with the area post office on Pennsylvania Route 272, just north of town.

== Geography ==
Wakefield is in southern Lancaster County, in the north-central part of Fulton Township. The Wakefield CDP includes Wakefield proper as well as the community of Penn Hill to the north, at the northern junction of PA 272 and U.S. Route 222. Both highways lead north to Lancaster, the county seat. PA 272's route is more direct, leading north-northwest through Buck 20 miles (32 km) to Lancaster, while US 222 curves north-northeast through Quarryville and rejoins PA 272 at Willow Street for a 24-mile (39 km) route to the city. To the south from Wakefield, US 222 leads 7.5 miles (12.1 km) to U.S. Route 1 in Maryland, just north of Conowingo Dam on the Susquehanna River, while PA 272 leads east from Wakefield 9 miles (14 km) to US 1 in Nottingham.

According to the U.S. Census Bureau, the Wakefield CDP has a total area of 1.7 square miles (4.4 km^{2}), of which 0.01 square miles (0.02 km^{2}), or 0.45%, are water. The community sits on a ridge, with the west side draining to Puddle Duck Creek, which leads to Peters Creek and the Susquehanna River, and the east side draining to Conowingo Creek, which joins the Susquehanna in Maryland.
