= Mechanics Grove, Pennsylvania =

Unincorporated community in Pennsylvania, US

- Unincorporated community
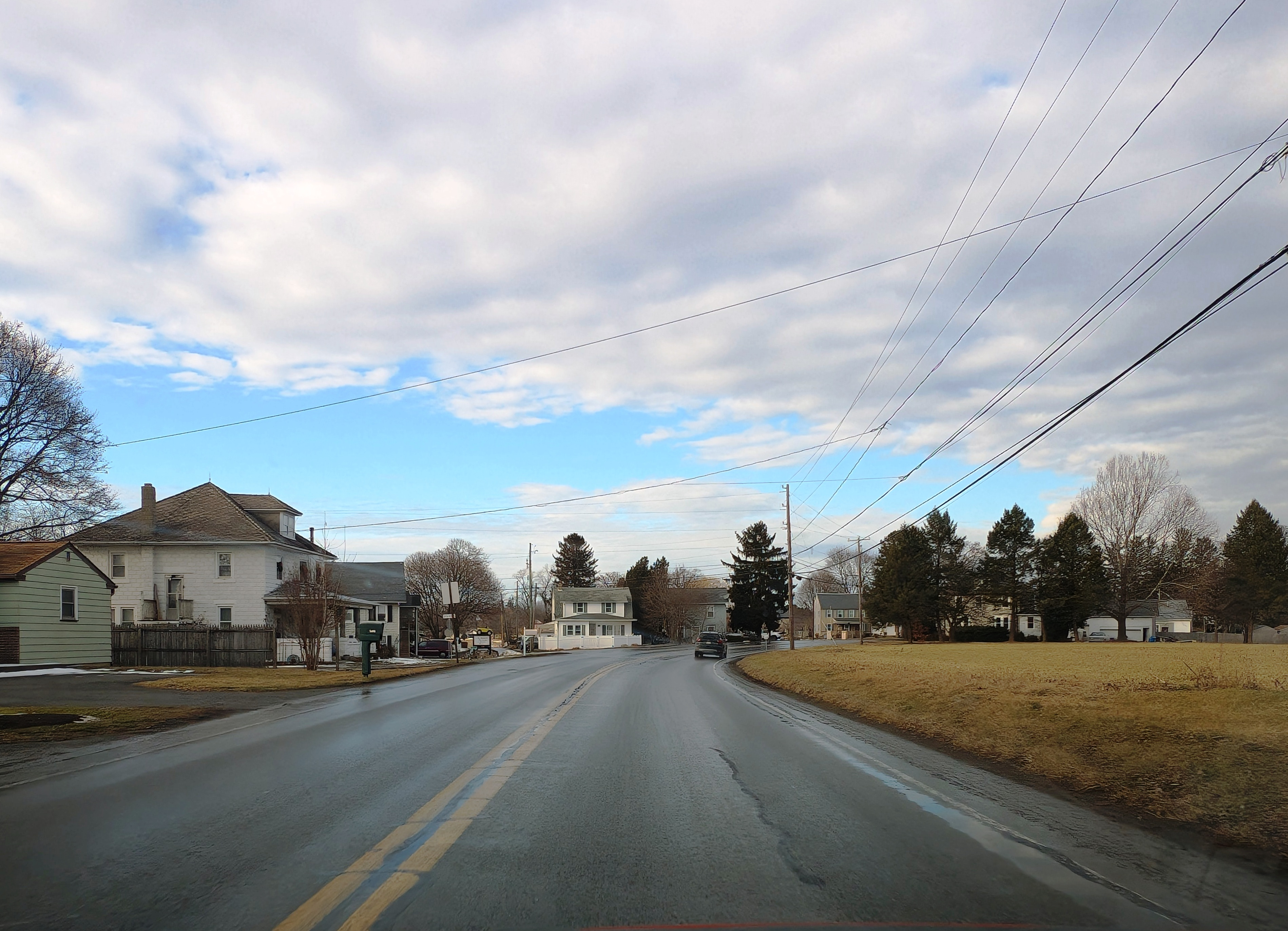
- US 222 northbound through Mechanics Grove

- Location in Pennsylvania Location in the United States
- Coordinates: 39°50′55″N 76°9′31″W
- Country: United States
- State: Pennsylvania
- County: Lancaster
- Township: East Drumore
- Elevation: 636 ft (194 m)
- Time zone: UTC-5 (Eastern (EST))
  - Summer (DST): UTC-4 (EDT)
- GNIS feature ID: 1180841

Mechanics Grove (also called Mechanic Grove) is an unincorporated community located within East Drumore Township in Lancaster County, Pennsylvania, United States. Mechanics Grove is located along U.S. Route 222, south of the town of Quarryville.
