= Buck, Pennsylvania =

Unincorporated community in Pennsylvania, US

- Unincorporated community
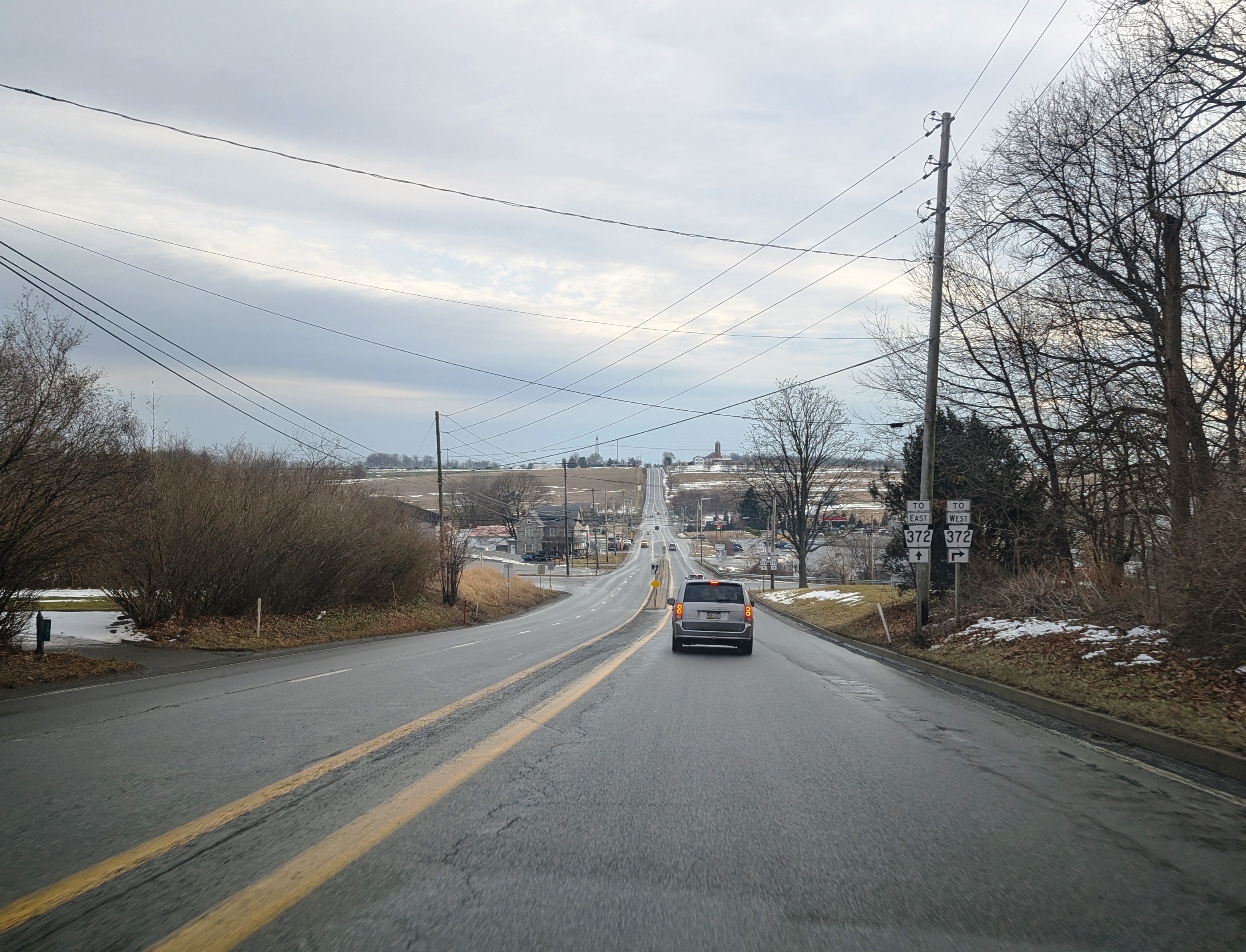
- PA 272 southbound entering Buck

- Location within Pennsylvania Location within the United States
- Coordinates: 39°52′21″N 76°13′44″W
- Country: United States
- State: Pennsylvania
- County: Lancaster
- Township: East Drumore
- Time zone: UTC-5 (Eastern (EST))
  - Summer (DST): UTC-4 (EDT)
- GNIS feature ID: 1203180

Buck is an unincorporated community in East Drumore Township in Lancaster County, Pennsylvania, United States. Pennsylvania Route 272 passes through the community.

It is the location of the Buck Motorsports Park, a local attraction.
