= East Drumore Township, Pennsylvania =

Township in Pennsylvania, US

Coordinates: 39°51′30″N 76°09′59″W

- Township
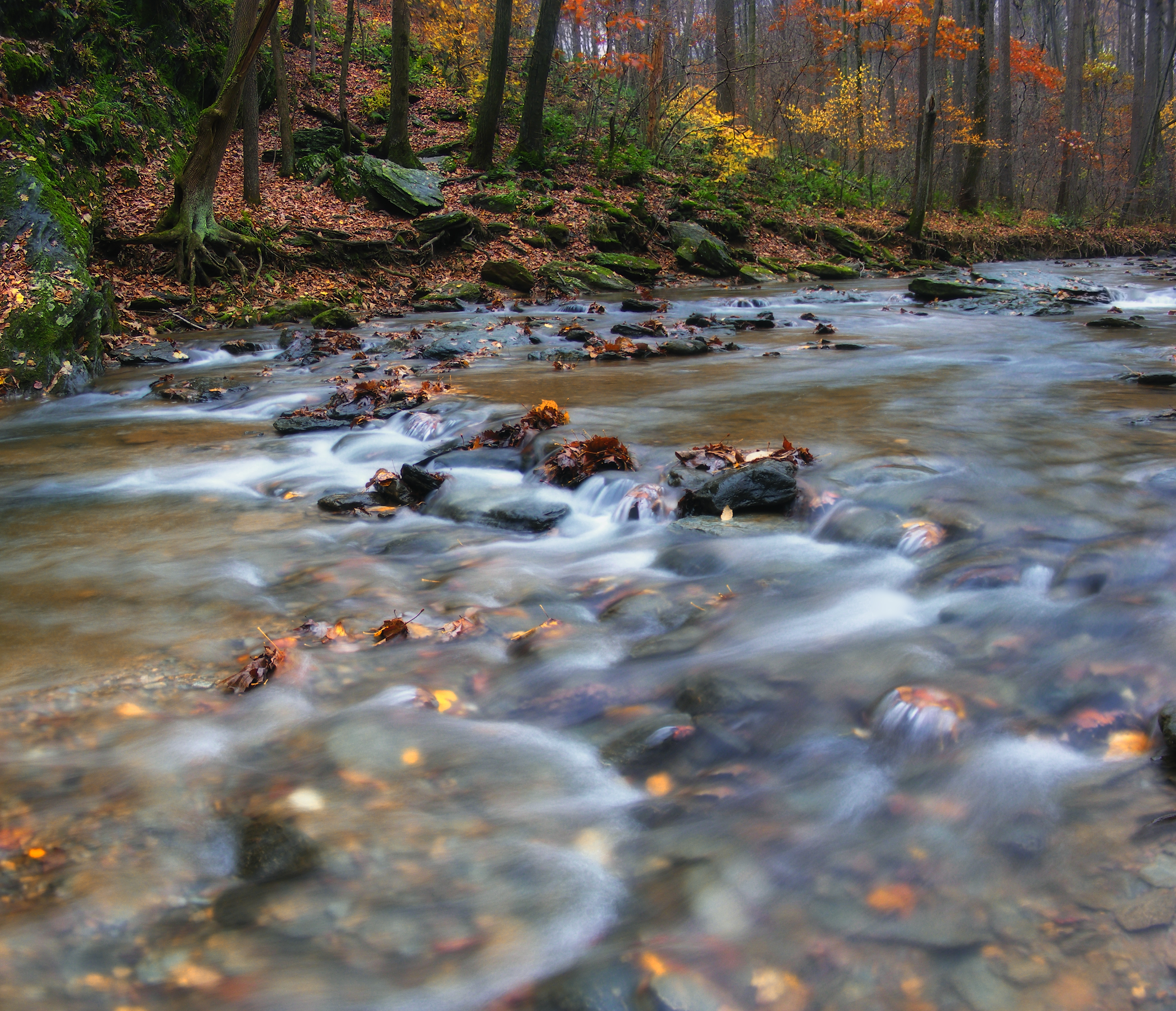
- Swift Run in the Theodore A. Parker III Natural Area

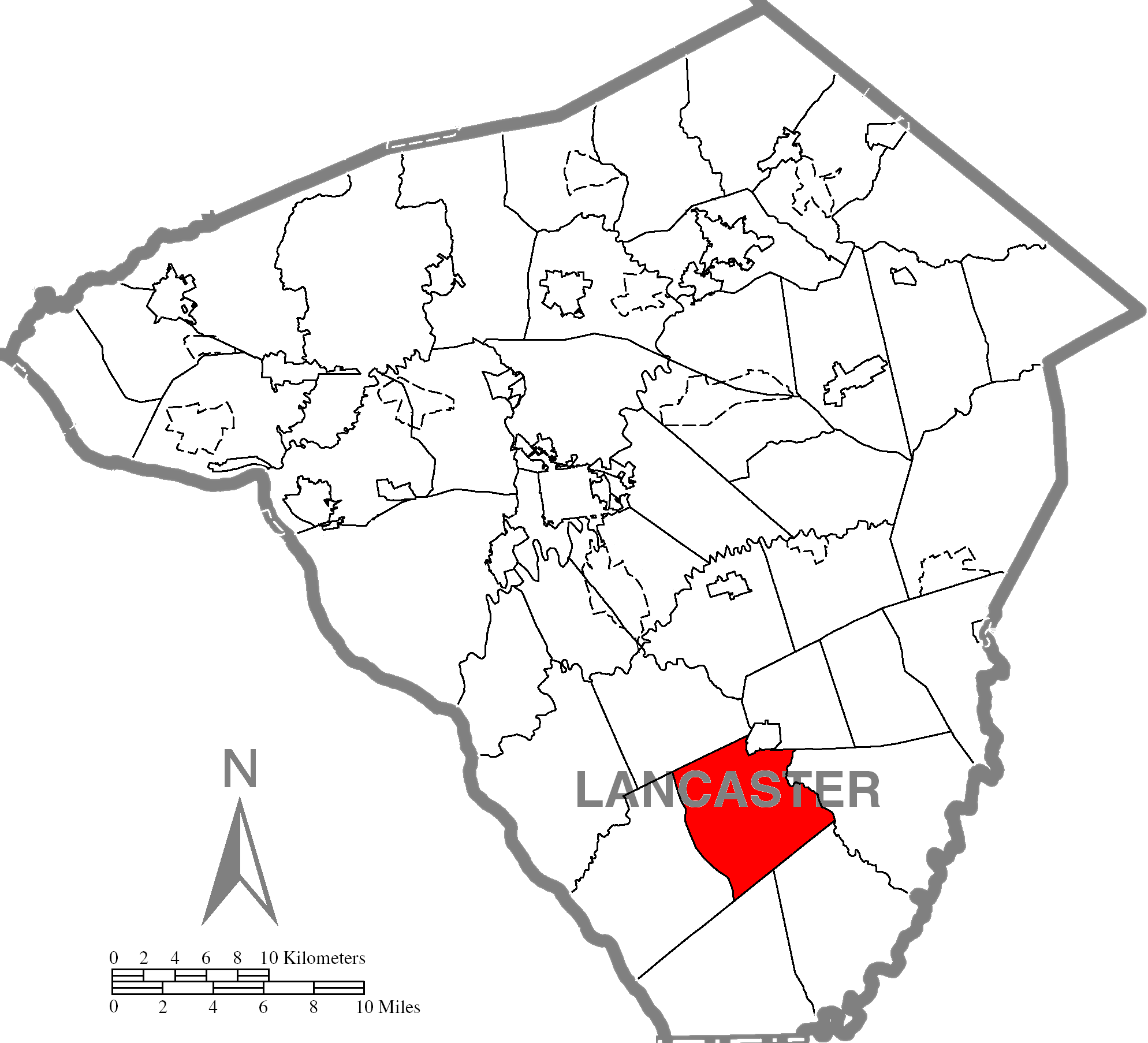
- Map of Lancaster County, Pennsylvania highlighting East Drumore Township

- Map of Lancaster County, Pennsylvania
- Country: United States
- State: Pennsylvania
- County: Lancaster
- Settled: 1700
- Incorporated: 1883

Government
  - Type: Board of Supervisors

Area
  - Total: 23.22 sq mi (60.13 km^{2})
  - Land: 23.14 sq mi (59.92 km^{2})
  - Water: 0.081 sq mi (0.21 km^{2})

Population (2020)
  - Total: 3,903 ▲
  - Estimate (2021): 3,887
  - Density: 167.5/sq mi (64.69/km^{2})
- Time zone: UTC-5 (Eastern (EST))
  - Summer (DST): UTC-4 (EDT)
- Area code: 717
- FIPS code: 42-071-21040
- Website: eastdrumoretownship.org

East Drumore Township is a township in south central Lancaster County, Pennsylvania, United States. At the 2020 census, the population was 3,903. It is part of the Solanco School District.

== Geography ==
According to the U.S. Census Bureau, the township has a total area of 23.2 square miles (60 km^{2}), all land. It includes the communities of Mechanic Grove, Puseyville, Unicorn, and Drumore Center, and part of Buck and Henzel.

It is named after Dromore, County Down (Note: Irish: Druim Moir) in Northern Ireland.

== Demographics ==
Historical population
Census	Pop.	Note	%±
2000	3,535		—
2010	3,791		7.2%
2020	3,903		3.0%
2021 (est.)	3,887		−0.4%
U.S. Decennial Census

As of the census of 2000, there were 3,535 people, 1,055 households, and 876 families living in the township. The population density was 152.2 inhabitants per square mile (58.8/km^{2}). There were 1,079 housing units at an average density of 46.5 units per square mile (18.0 units/km^{2}). The racial makeup of the township was 98.36% White, 0.45% Black or African American, 0.03% Native American, 0.14% Asian, 0.06% Pacific Islander, 0.62% from other races, and 0.34% from two or more races. 0.82% of the population were Hispanic or Latino of any race.

There were 1,055 households, out of which 38.9% had children under the age of 18 living with them, 73.5% were married couples living together, 6.6% had a female householder with no husband present, and 16.9% were non-families. 14.1% of all households were made up of individuals, and 5.6% had someone living alone who was 65 years of age or older. The average household size was 3.00 and the average family size was 3.31.

In the township the population was spread out, with 27.8% under the age of 18, 7.0% from 18 to 24, 23.6% from 25 to 44, 21.6% from 45 to 64, and 19.9% who were 65 years of age or older. The median age was 39 years. For every 100 females, there were 90.0 males. For every 100 females age 18 and over, there were 83.9 males.

The median income for a household in the township was $47,237, and the median income for a family was $49,726. Males had a median income of $36,768 versus $22,398 for females. The per capita income for the township was $17,229. About 8.6% of families and 12.9% of the population were below the poverty line, including 21.8% of those under age 18 and 2.9% of those age 65 or over.
