= Fulton Township, Pennsylvania =

Township in Pennsylvania, US

Coordinates: 39°45′N 76°11′W

- Township
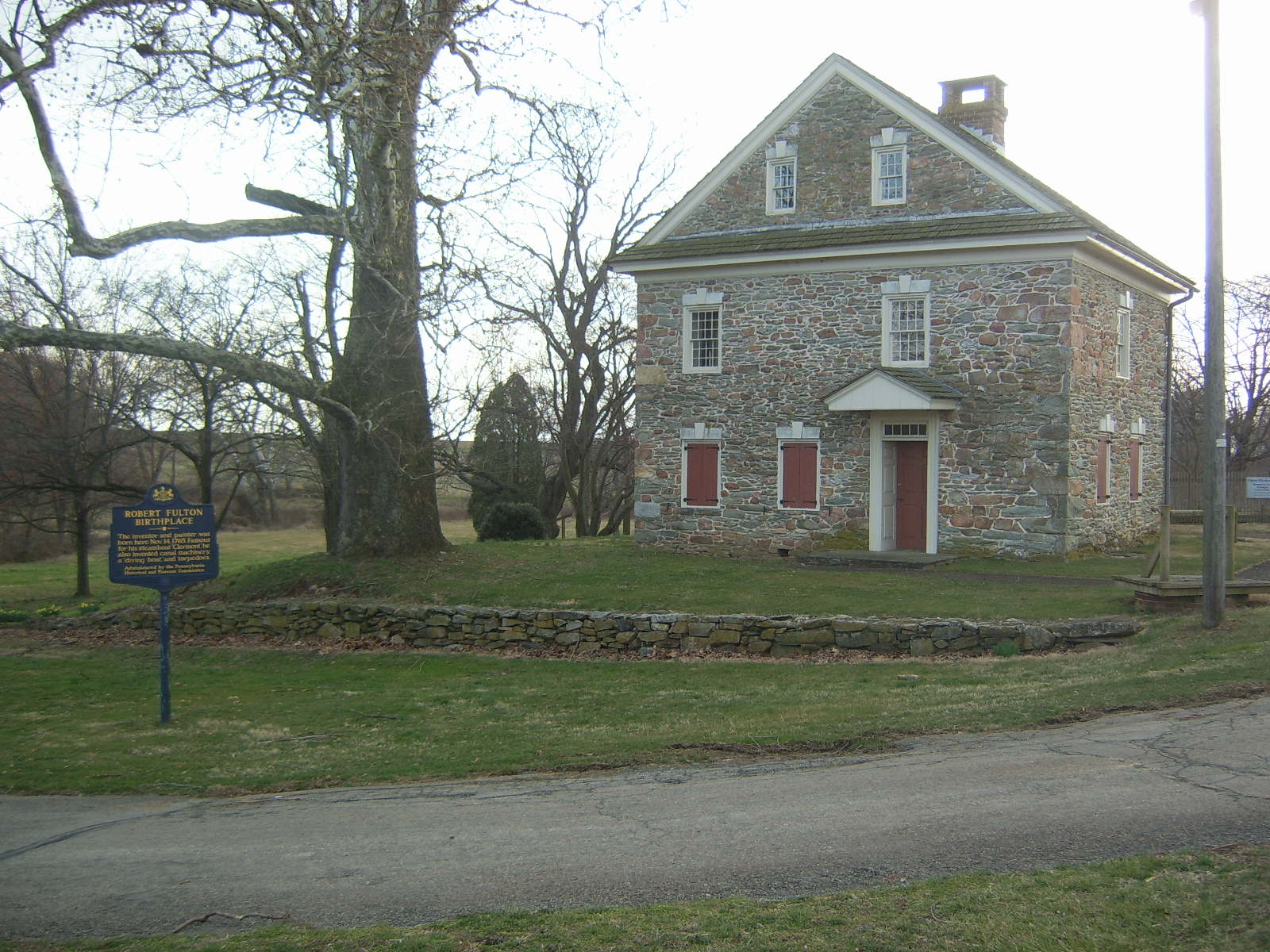
- Robert Fulton Birthplace; National Register of Historic Places

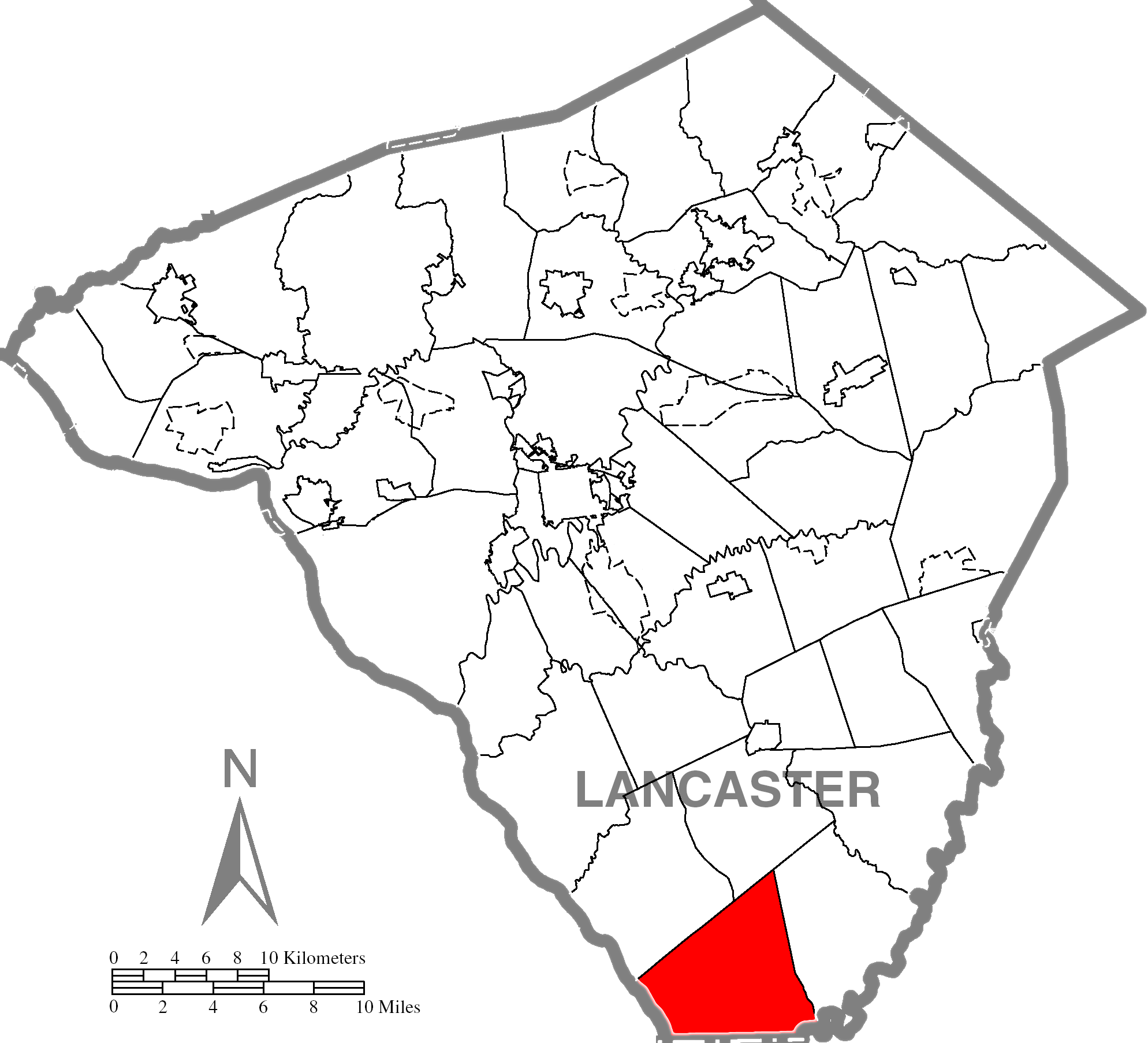
- Map of Lancaster County, Pennsylvania highlighting Fulton Township

- Map of Lancaster County, Pennsylvania
- Country: United States
- State: Pennsylvania
- County: Lancaster
- Settled: 1733
- Incorporated: 1844

Government
  - Type: Board of Supervisors

Area
  - Total: 29.23 sq mi (75.71 km^{2})
  - Land: 25.79 sq mi (66.79 km^{2})
  - Water: 3.44 sq mi (8.91 km^{2})

Population (2020)
  - Total: 3,227 ▼
  - Estimate (2021): 3,213
  - Density: 122.1/sq mi (47.15/km^{2})
- Time zone: UTC-5 (Eastern (EST))
  - Summer (DST): UTC-4 (EDT)
- Area code: 717
- FIPS code: 42-071-28168
- Website: www.fultontownship.com

Fulton Township is a township in southern Lancaster County, Pennsylvania, United States, and it is the only municipality in the county to touch the Maryland border. At the 2020 census the population was 3,227. It is part of the Solanco School District.

== History ==
The Robert Fulton Birthplace is within the township; it was listed on the National Register of Historic Places in 1966.

== Geography ==
According to the U.S. Census Bureau, the township has a total area of 29.3 square miles (76 km^{2}), of which 25.9 square miles (67 km^{2}) is land and 3.4 square miles (8.8 km^{2}) (11.60%) is water. Unincorporated communities in the township include Eldora, Goshen, Penn Hill, Wakefield, Peach Bottom, McSparran, New Texas, Black Baron, Pleasant Grove, Jenkins Corner, and part of Wrightsdale.

== Demographics ==
Historical population
Census	Pop.	Note	%±
2000	2,826		—
2010	3,074		8.8%
2020	3,227		5.0%
2021 (est.)	3,213		−0.4%
U.S. Decennial Census

As of the census of 2000, there were 2,826 people, 932 households, and 748 families living in the township. The population density was 109.1 inhabitants per square mile (42.1/km^{2}). There were 1,043 housing units at an average density of 40.3 units per square mile (15.6 units/km^{2}). The racial makeup of the township was 97.45% White, 1.27% Black or African American, 0.04% Native American, 0.21% Asian, 0.32% from other races, and 0.71% from two or more races. 1.20% of the population were Hispanic or Latino of any race.

There were 932 households, out of which 40.3% had children under the age of 18 living with them, 67.9% were married couples living together, 7.1% had a female householder with no husband present, and 19.7% were non-families. 16.2% of all households were made up of individuals, and 5.5% had someone living alone who was 65 years of age or older. The average household size was 3.03 and the average family size was 3.41.

In the township the population was spread out, with 33.6% under the age of 18, 7.2% from 18 to 24, 28.9% from 25 to 44, 21.7% from 45 to 64, and 8.6% who were 65 years of age or older. The median age was 32 years. For every 100 females, there were 99.9 males. For every 100 females age 18 and over, there were 100.5 males.

The median income for a household in the township was $41,356 and the median income for a family was $44,394. Males had a median income of $35,027 versus $24,205 for females. The per capita income for the township was $15,735. About 10.4% of families and 13.7% of the population were below the poverty line, including 17.4% of those under age 18 and 20.1% of those age 65 or over.

== Notable person ==
- Christopher McDougall – Writer and journalist, author of Born to Run: A Hidden Tribe, Superathletes, and the Greatest Race the World Has Never Seen (2009). Resides in Peach Bottom.
