= Columbia, Pennsylvania (disambiguation) =

Columbia, Pennsylvania could refer to:

- Columbia, Lancaster County, Pennsylvania
  - Columbia Historic District (Columbia, Pennsylvania)
  - Columbia Borough School District
- Columbia County, Pennsylvania
- Columbia Township, Bradford County, Pennsylvania
