= Ralph Heller Beittel =

American composer

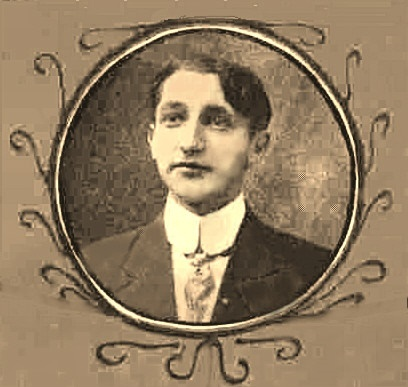
Ralph Heller Beittel, 1909

Ralph Heller Beittel (November 5, 1884 – June 22, 1971) was an American composer. He was the eldest of ten children of Benjamin David Beittel and Lavina Heller Ebersole.

== Early life and education ==
Beittel was born in Columbia, Pennsylvania. He graduated from the Columbia High School and worked in his father's Racket Store, a type of general store, and later ran it after his father's death. He married Ada Grace Gram (November 6, 1889 – February 3, 1941) in 1912 in Columbia. The family moved to Lancaster, Pennsylvania where Beittel ran a five-and-ten-cent store and throughout his life worked in retail in Pennsylvania, New York State and California. His affiliations included managerships for McCrory Stores, Butler Brothers, D. F. Neufield (all in New York state) and Segners 5-and-10 in Los Angeles.

== Career as composer ==
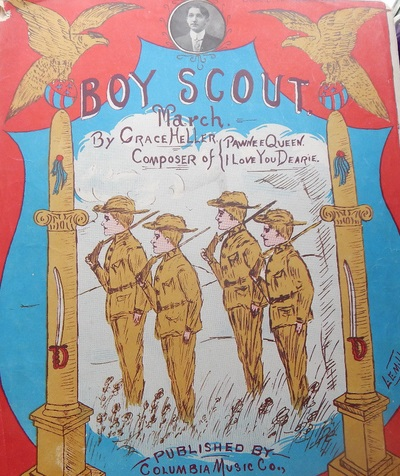
Cover of "Boy Scout March"

Beittel was an accomplished composer and had several of his songs published and recorded in the Library of Congress Copyright Office. His first works were published under the pseudonym "Grace Heller" (a combination of his future wife's and his middle name) and were self-published under his own company called "The Columbia Music Company", Columbia. He attempted to start one of the first subscription series for sheet music by offering a new piece each month for $1.25 per year with a goal of acquiring 10,000 subscribers. Although he used the "Grace Heller" pseudonym for these first songs, he retained the copyright under R. H. Beittel. These songs included: "Take Me Up in An Airship", "Boy Scout March", "I Love you Dearie", "My Dreams of You", "Pawnee Queen-Indian Love Song", "When the Band Plays s Southern Tune", all published in 1911 and "Everybody Works But Ma—She's an Advocate of Women's Rights", "She Loves You in the Same Old Fashioned Way", both published in 1913.

Beittel wrote "That Regular Rag" in 1913 under his own name and it was published by The Edgar Selden Music Company, New York. In 1944 he self-published under the Mark Templer Music Co, N.Y. "A Picture of You" and used the pseudonym of Eddy Marks & Ray Templer. His next known published work was "Our Boys" under his name and published in 1945 by the Nordyke Publishing Company, California. In 1946 he wrote "Let Me Dream", under his own name, and published by the Hollywood Song Guild, California. In 1950 he wrote two songs published by the Dubonnet Music Publishing Company, New York, "It's Christmas" and "Let Me Out of the Stable". His last known song was "Kisses" published in 1960 by the Dial Record Label in California.

== Family ==
Beittel and Ada Grace Gram had one son, Wilbur (March 3, 1913 – February 9, 1999) who was an accomplished music arranger for Hollywood films and later a noted arborist in Santa Barbara, California.

== Death ==
Beittel died on June 22, 1971, in Canoga Park, Los Angeles, California.
