= Columbia Historic District (Columbia, Pennsylvania) =

Historic district in Pennsylvania, United States

- U.S. National Register of Historic Places
- U.S. Historic district
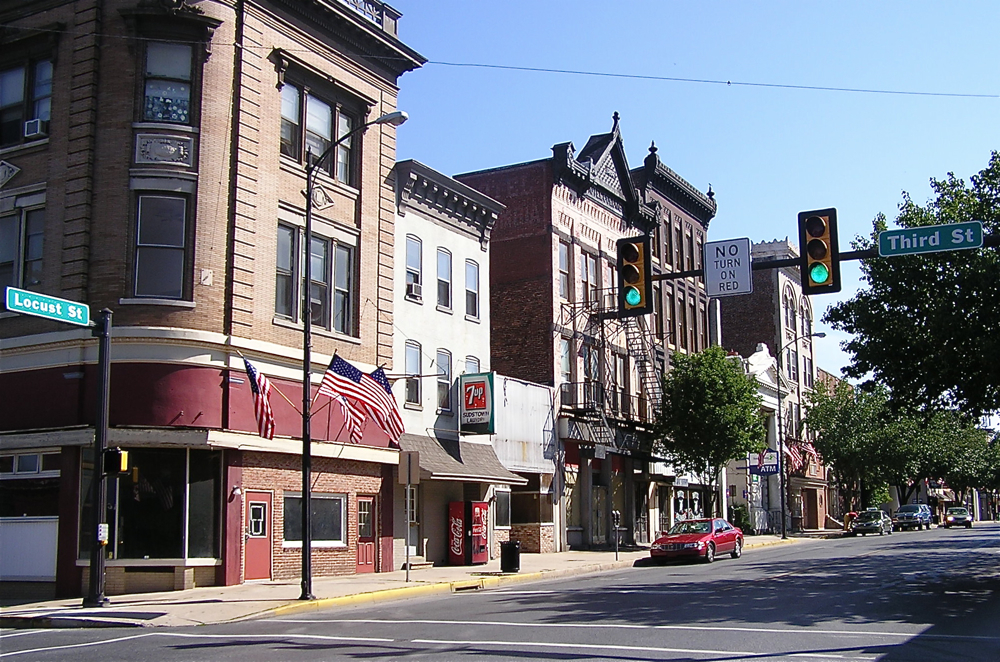
- Downtown Columbia, June 2006

- Location within Pennsylvania Location within the United States
- Location: Roughly bounded by Susquehanna River, Union, Cedar, 4th, and 5th Sts., Chestnut to 9th St., Columbia, Pennsylvania
- Coordinates: 40°02′02″N 76°30′12″W
- Area: 171 acres (69 ha)
- Architect: Multiple
- Architectural style: Late Victorian, Mixed (more Than 2 Styles From Different Periods)
- NRHP reference No.: 83002249
- Added to NRHP: May 6, 1983

Columbia Historic District is a national historic district located at Columbia, Lancaster County, Pennsylvania. The district includes 833 contributing buildings, 2 contributing sites, and 7 contributing structures in the central business district and surrounding residential areas of Columbia. The district is primarily residential with notable examples of Late Victorian architectural styles. Notable non-residential buildings include the Reading and Columbia Freight Station (1883), Holy Trinity Catholic Church and School (1915), American Legion Post 469, Women's Club, Columbia Lodge #1074 BPOE, Columbia Town Hall (1874, 1947), St. Paul's Episcopal Church (1888), Franklin Hotel (c. 1833), and Columbia Water Company (1849 and later). Located in the district is the separately listed Bachman and Forry Tobacco Warehouse.

It was listed on the National Register of Historic Places in 1983.

== Gallery ==
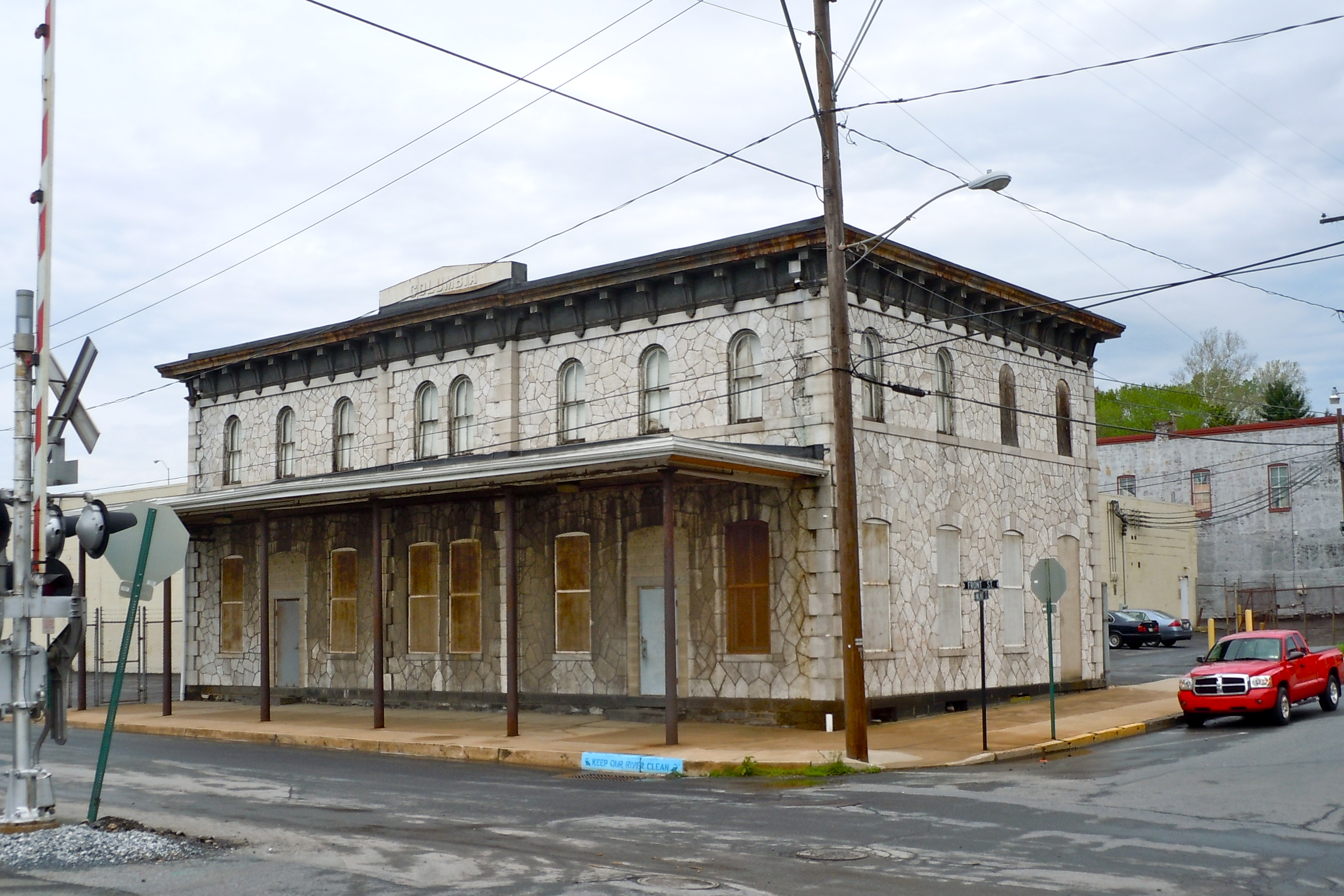
Front and Walnut Streets, Columbia PA, April 2011

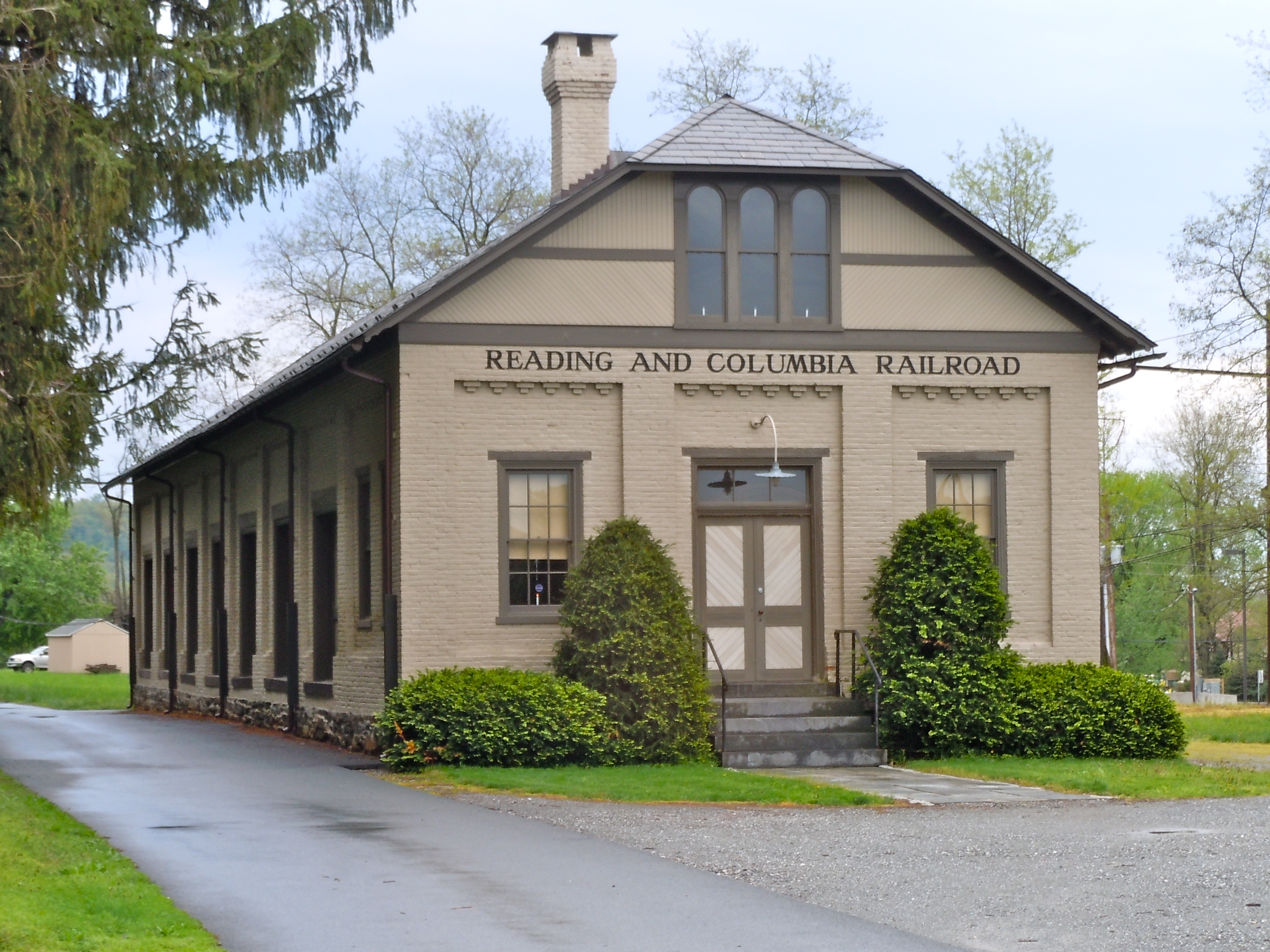
Reading and Columbia Railroad station
