= Wright's Ferry Mansion =

Historic house in Pennsylvania, US

- U.S. National Register of Historic Places
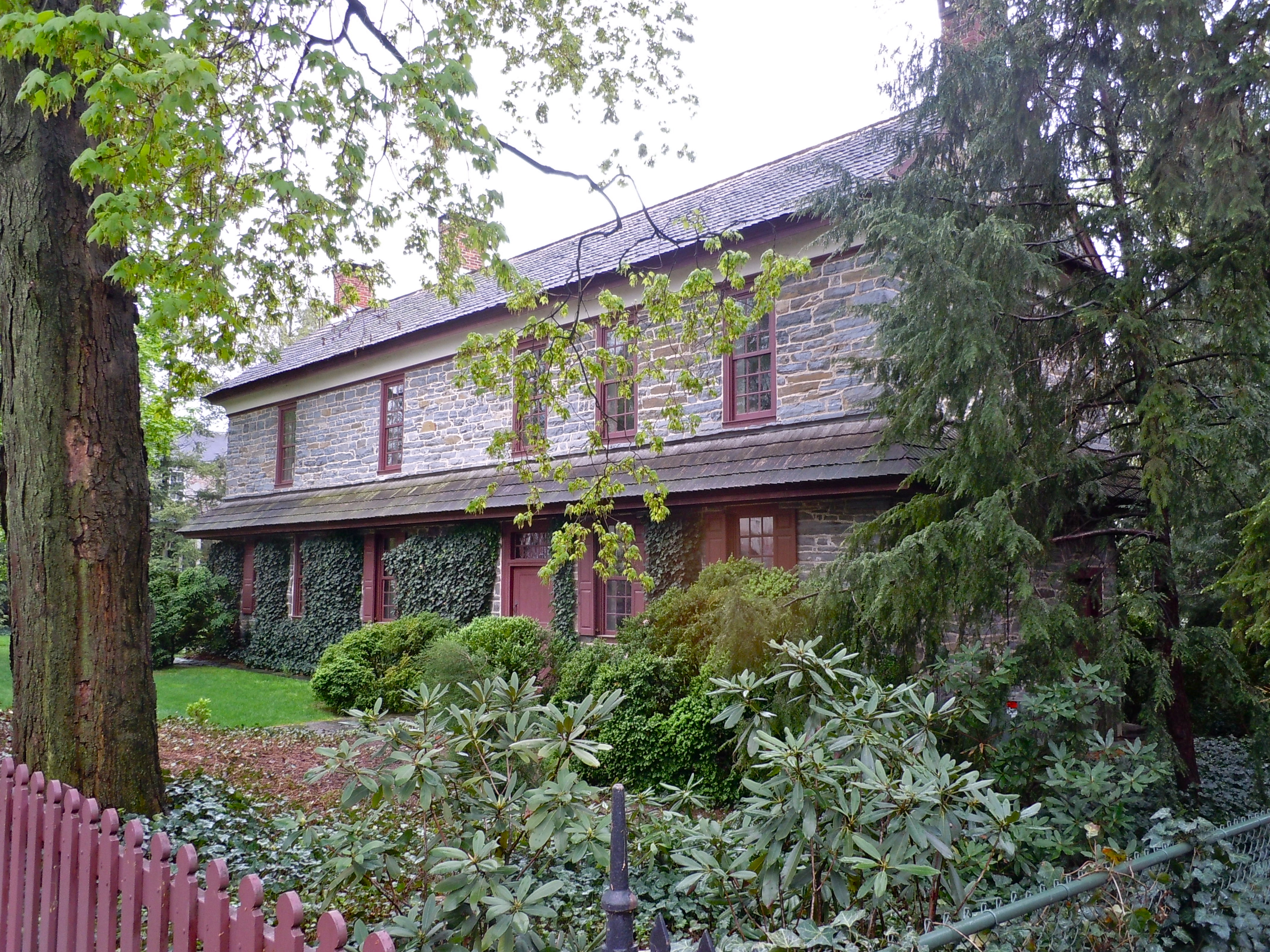
- Wrights Ferry Mansion, April 2011

- Location within Pennsylvania Location within the United States
- Location: 38 S. 2nd St., Columbia, Pennsylvania
- Coordinates: 40°1′46″N 76°30′12″W
- Area: 0.8 acres (0.32 ha)
- Built: 1738
- NRHP reference No.: 79002253
- Added to NRHP: November 20, 1979

Wright's Ferry Mansion is a historic home in Columbia, Lancaster County, Pennsylvania, United States.

It was listed on the National Register of Historic Places in 1979.

== History and architectural features ==
Built in 1738, this historic structure is a 2 1/2-story, rectangular, limestone dwelling with a gable roof and pent eave. It was built for Susanna Wright, an English Quaker poet and businesswoman; its architecture reflects a mix of English and Germanic elements.

The house was restored to appear as in 1750 and is open to the public several days a week from May through October.
