= Columbia Wagon Works =

- U.S. National Register of Historic Places
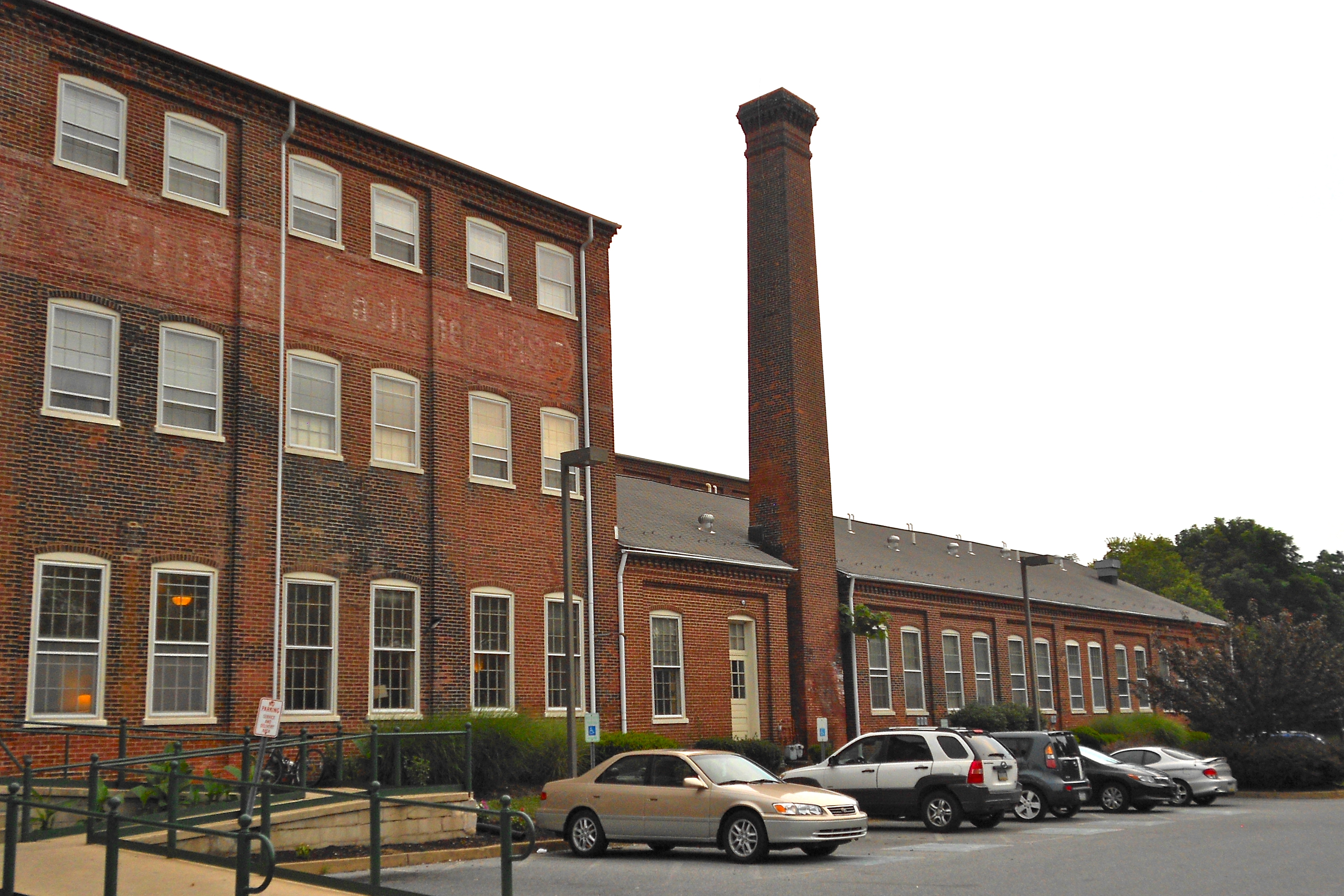
- Columbia Wagon Works, July 2013

- Location within Pennsylvania Location within the United States
- Location: 920 Plane St., Columbia, Pennsylvania
- Coordinates: 40°1′39″N 76°29′23″W
- Area: 3.8 acres (1.5 ha)
- Architectural style: Late Victorian
- NRHP reference No.: 01000057
- Added to NRHP: February 2, 2001

Columbia Wagon Works, also known as Colonial Wagon Company, is a historic wagon factory complex located at Columbia in Lancaster County, Pennsylvania. The complex was built between 1889 and 1920, and includes seven contributing buildings. They are rectangular brick factory buildings with heavy timber frame construction. Six of the buildings are arranged in an "H"-shape. The buildings range in height from one to 3 1/2-stories. The wagon company closed in 1926, after which the buildings housed a tobacco warehouse operated by the American Cigarette & Cigar Company and produce warehouses. Between 1994 and 1996, the complex was converted to house 60 apartments.

It was listed on the National Register of Historic Places in 2001.

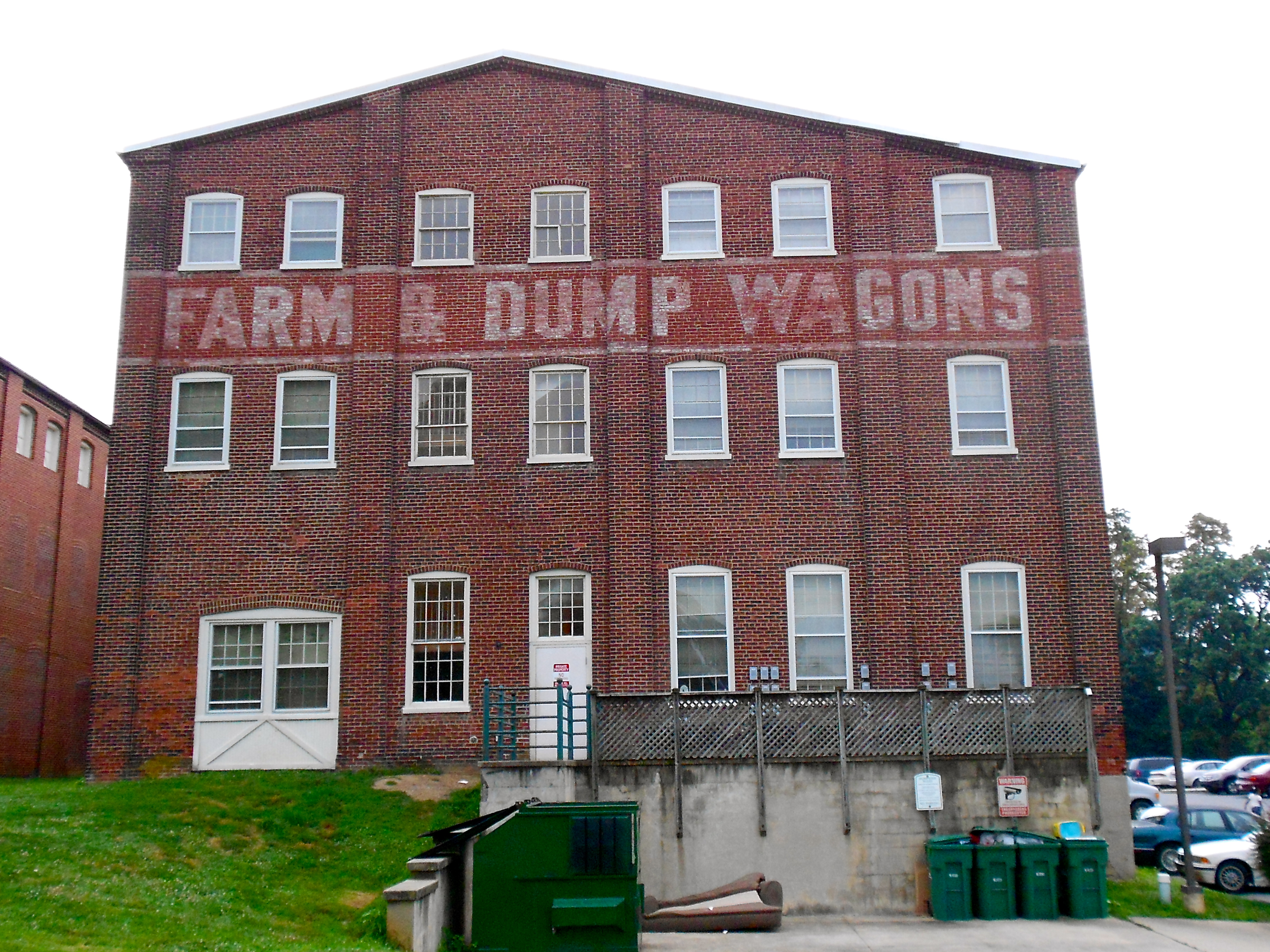
A painted sign "FARM & DUMP WAGONS" is still visible on one building

== See also ==
- Wisconsin Wagon Company Factory
