= Manor Street Elementary School =

- U.S. National Register of Historic Places
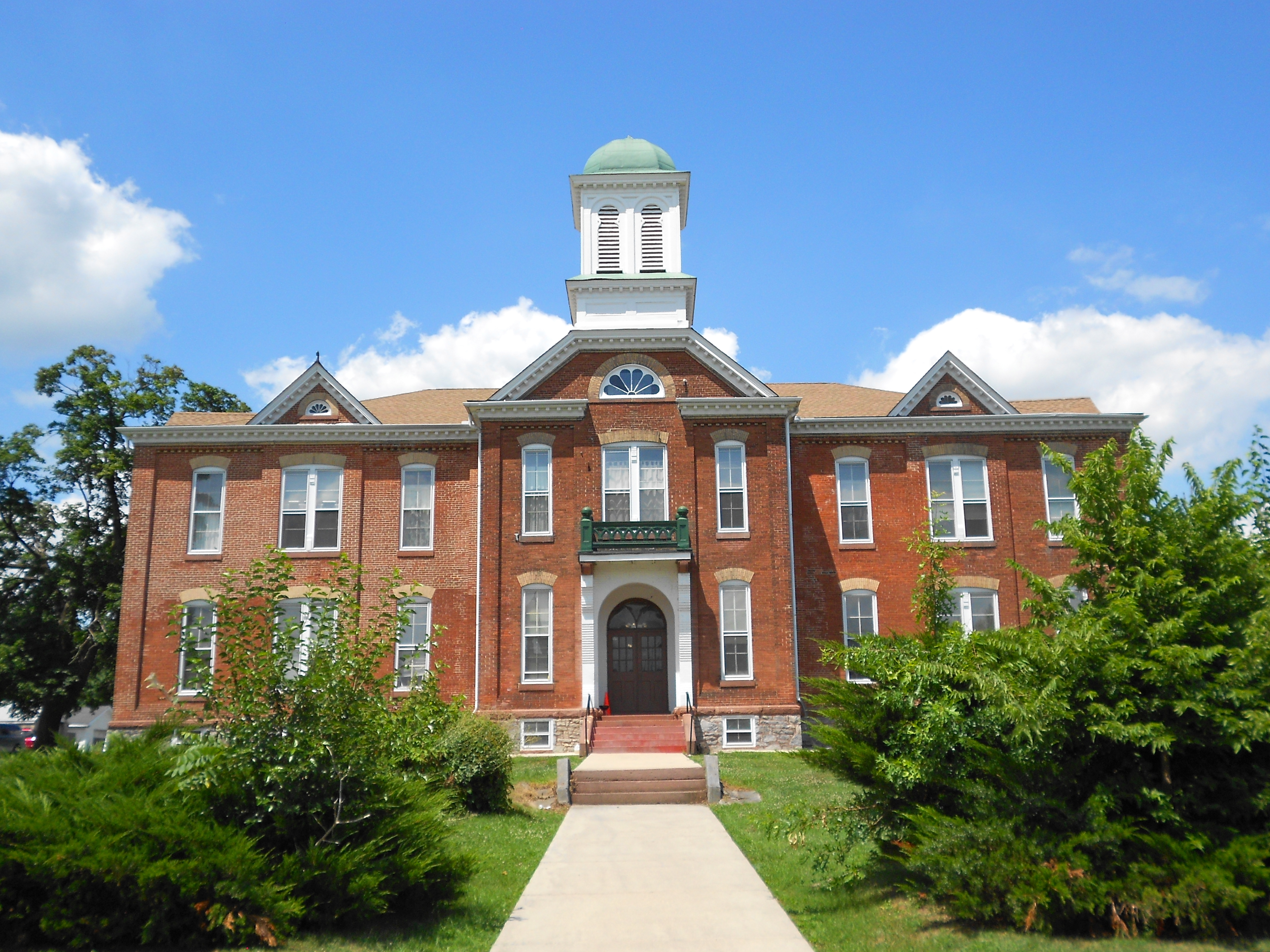
- The school in 2013

- Location within Pennsylvania Location within the United States
- Location: Tenth and Manor Sts., Columbia, Pennsylvania
- Coordinates: 40°01′40″N 76°29′23″W
- Area: 1.4 acres (0.57 ha)
- Built: 1895
- NRHP reference No.: 87000572
- Added to NRHP: April 2, 1987

The Manor Street Elementary School, also known as the Manor Street School, is an historic elementary school building in Columbia in Lancaster County, Pennsylvania, United States.

It was listed on the National Register of Historic Places in 1987.

== History and architectural features ==
Built in 1895, this historic structure is a two-and-one-half-story brick building that sits on a stone foundation. It has a cross-axial plan with a two-story main section, flanked by two-story wings in the east and west sides. The front facade features a three-story tower with frame bell tower.
