= Wisconsin Wagon Company Factory =

- U.S. National Register of Historic Places
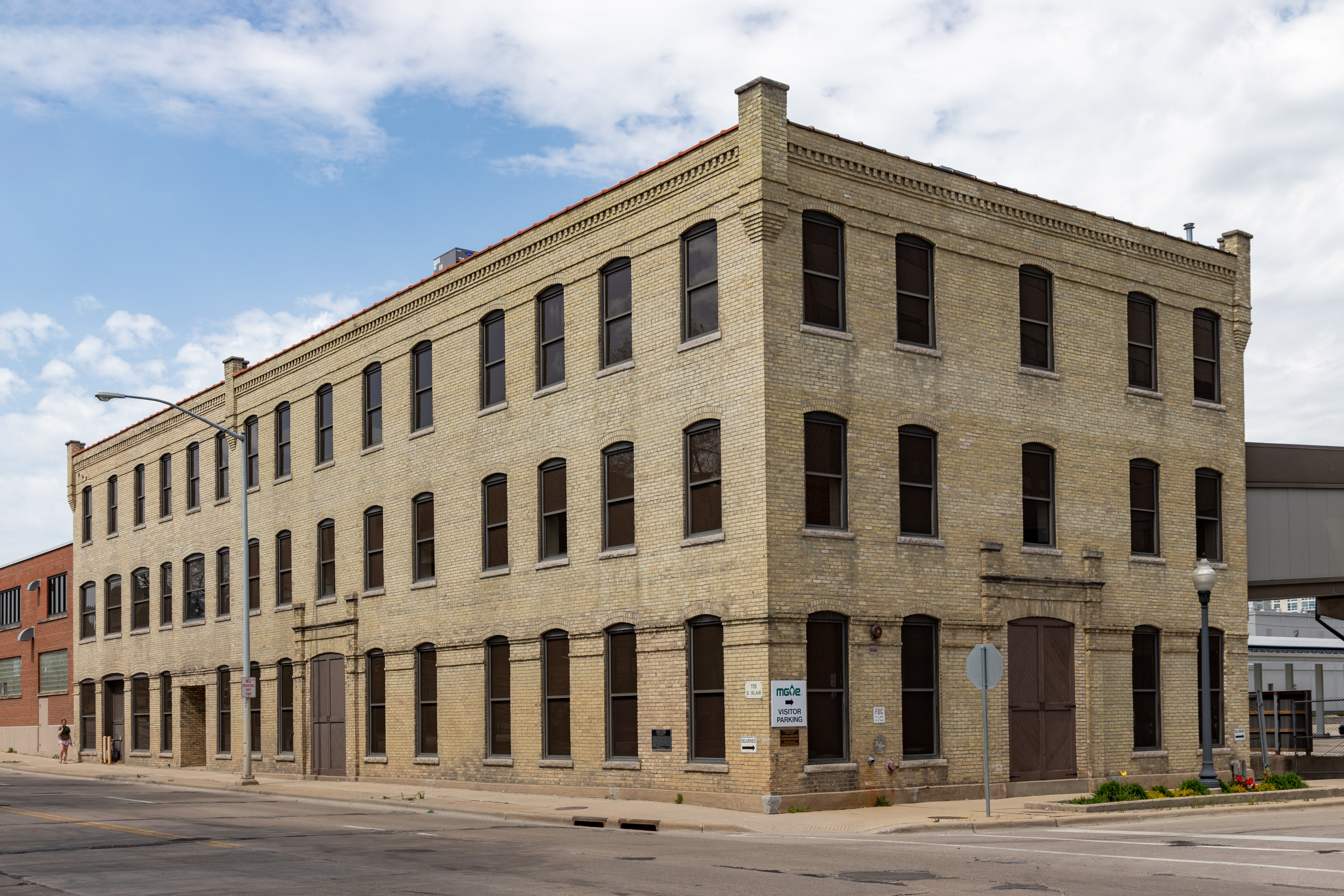

- Location within Wisconsin Location within the United States
- Location: 602 Railroad St., Madison, Wisconsin
- Coordinates: 43°4′39″N 89°22′35″W
- Area: less than one acre
- Built: 1903
- Architectural style: Victorian
- NRHP reference No.: 02001343
- Added to NRHP: November 15, 2002

The Wisconsin Wagon Company Factory is a historic factory building located at 602 Railroad Street in Madison, Wisconsin. The Wisconsin Wagon Company built the factory building in 1903 to construct horse-drawn wagons and carriages. The company transitioned the building to an auto factory in 1917 and continued to use it until 1957. The building is a well-preserved example of a textile mill industrial loft, a popular factory style in many industries around the turn of the century. It was added to the National Register of Historic Places in 2002.

== History ==
The Wisconsin Wagon Company formed in 1883 and purchased the factory site the same year; the site originally consisted of a stone manufacturing building and a warehouse. In 1903, the company built the present factory building, which replaced the warehouse and supplemented the stone manufacturing building. An addition was placed on the building in 1911, allowing the company to conduct all of its operations in one building, and the stone building was demolished. The company made horse-drawn wagons and carriages in the building until 1917, when it became an automobile company and converted its factory accordingly. It subsequently changed its name to the Hansen Auto Body Company, and it continued to use the factory until it moved to a new building in 1957. Automatic Temperature Supplies, a refrigeration and HVAC company, purchased the building and used it as a warehouse until 1974; its current occupant, Madison Gas & Electric, bought the property in 1985.

The building was added to the National Register of Historic Places on November 15, 2002. It was also designated a landmark by the Madison Landmarks Commission in 2002.

== Architecture ==
The factory is a textile mill industrial loft, a type of industrial building common between 1885 and 1930. Industrial lofts had a long, narrow plan which maximized ventilation and natural light on the factory floor. The factory, like most industrial lofts, has a timber frame skeleton designed to efficiently bear weight; the frame was later reinforced with steel. The textile mill subtype, which spread beyond textiles to other heavy manufacturing industries, focused on fire prevention and reducing the effects of vibrating machinery; in the factory, this can be seen in the exposed walls and beams and the adjacent staircase and elevator. While most industrial lofts were utilitarian in design, the factory has some stylistic features; pilasters and an entablature frame the entrance, and the parapet atop the building has fortress-like projections at the corners.

== See also ==
- Columbia Wagon Works
