= Columbia–Wrightsville Bridge =

Road and sidewalk overpass in Pennsylvania

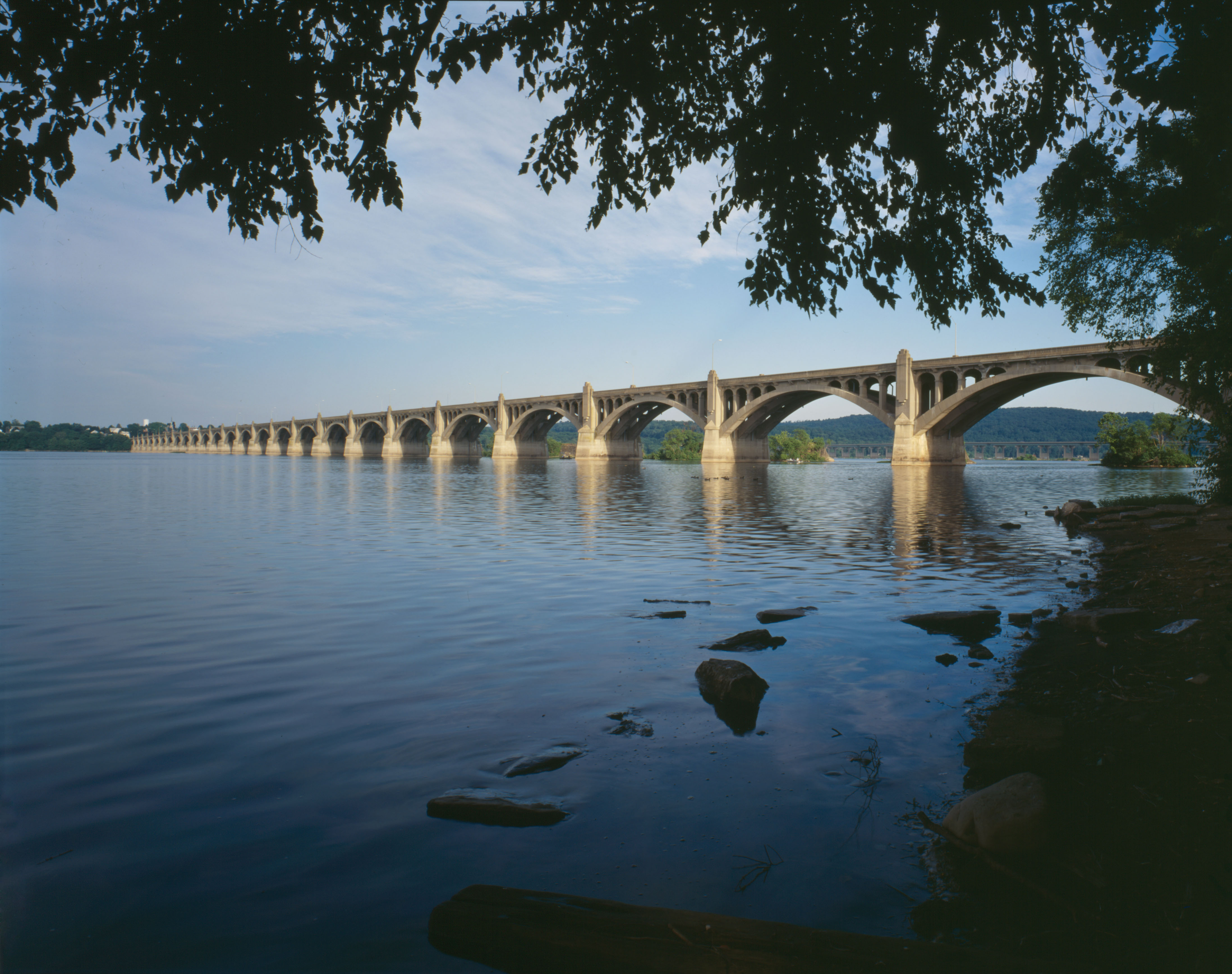
- Looking west over the Susquehanna River
- Coordinates: 40°01′44″N 76°31′01″W
- Carries: 2 lanes of PA 462 / BicyclePA Route S
- Crosses: Susquehanna River
- Locale: Wrightsville, Pennsylvania and Columbia, Pennsylvania
- Official name: Veterans Memorial Bridge
- Maintained by: PennDOT
- ID number: 360462001000000

Characteristics
- Design: concrete deck arch bridge
- Total length: 6,657 feet (2,029 m)
- Width: 48 feet (15 m)
- Longest span: 185 feet (56 m)

History
- Opened: September 30, 1930 (95 years ago)

Statistics
- Daily traffic: 10,350 (2004)
- Toll: was $0.25 for cars when opened; toll no longer collected

Location
- Interactive map of Columbia–Wrightsville Bridge

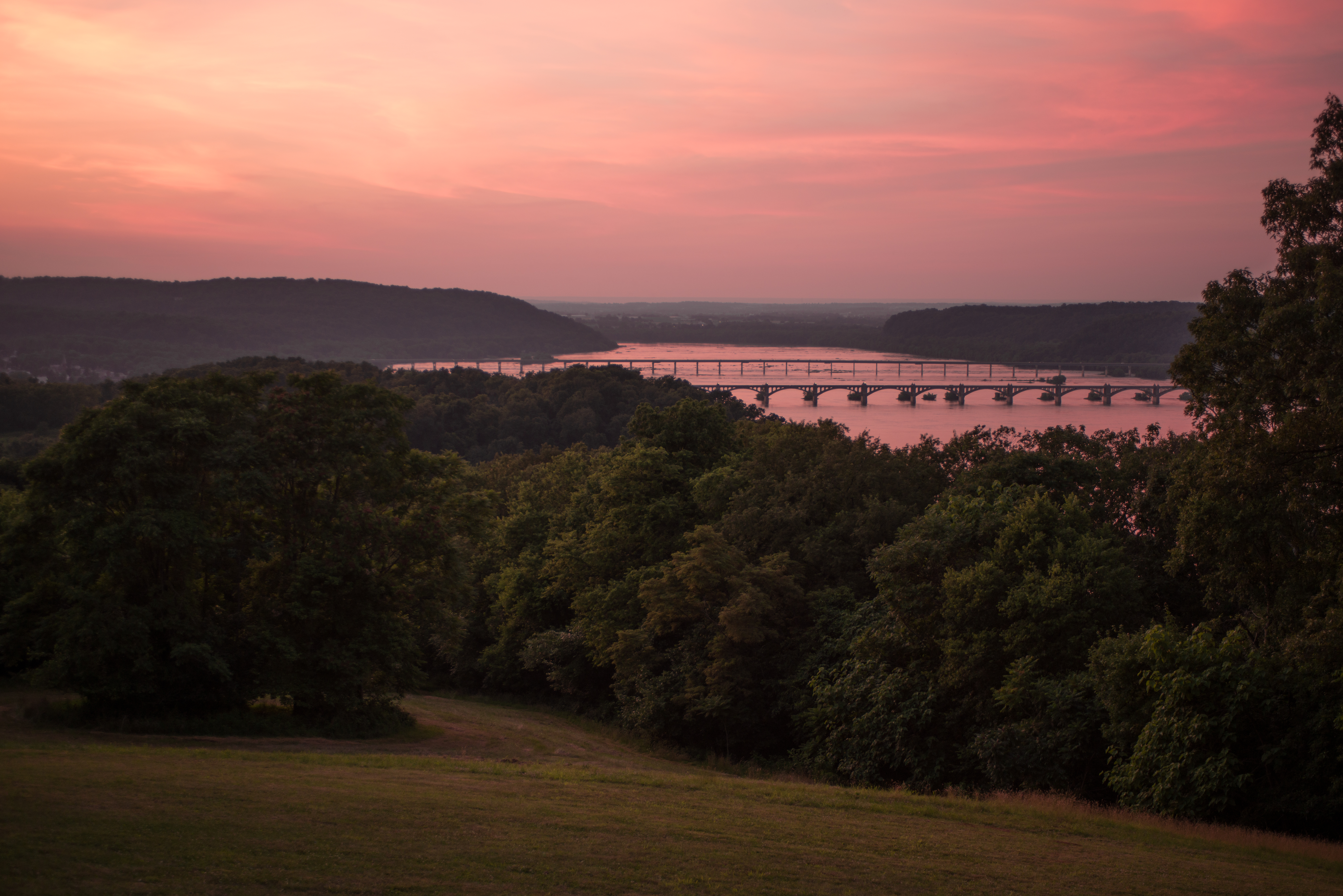
Columbia-Wrightsville Bridge (foreground) from south in 2014

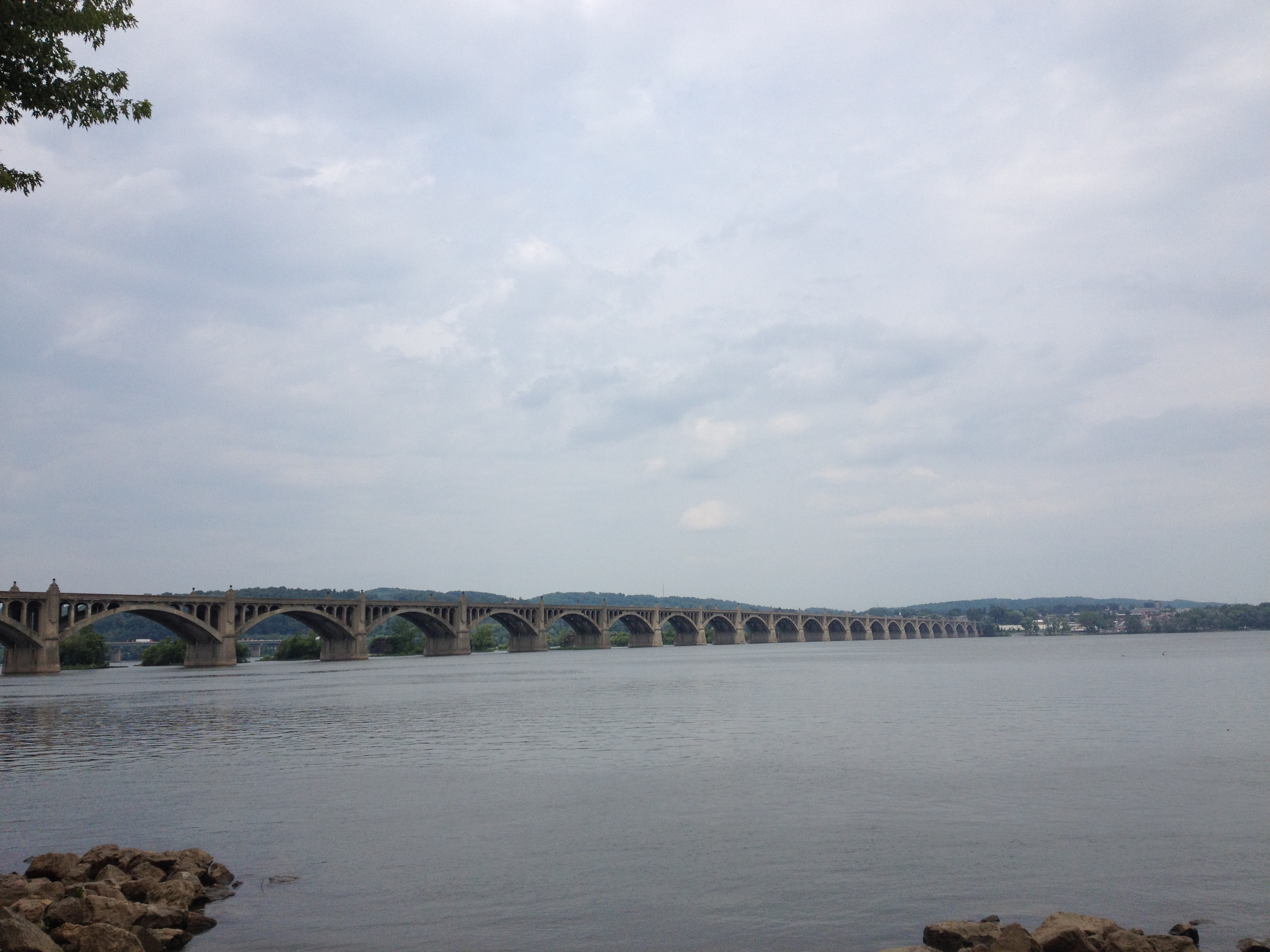
The current Columbia–Wrightsville Bridge looking northeast from Wrightsville

The Columbia–Wrightsville Bridge, officially the Veterans Memorial Bridge, spans the Susquehanna River between Columbia and Wrightsville, Pennsylvania, and carries Pennsylvania Route 462 and BicyclePA Route S. Built originally as the Lancaster-York Intercounty Bridge, construction began in 1929, and the bridge opened September 30, 1930. On November 11, 1980, it was officially dedicated as Veterans Memorial Bridge, though it is still referenced locally as the Columbia–Wrightsville Bridge.

In nominating the present Columbia–Wrightsville Bridge as an engineering landmark, the Pennsylvania section of the American Society of Civil Engineers noted that it is "a splendid example of the graceful multiple-span, reinforced-concrete arched form popular in early 20th Century highway bridges in the United States." The bridge is designated State Route 462 and is listed on the National Register of Historic Places, and is also a National Historic Civil Engineering Landmark. Instead of being replaced by a name such as the Old Lincoln Highway, its name is a kept part of the historic Lincoln Highway in local naming, the nation's first transcontinental highway, connecting a series of local highways and stretching from New York City to San Francisco. The opening in 1940 of the cross-state Pennsylvania Turnpike, a part of Interstate 76, subsequently provided faster passage.

== History ==
=== Construction ===
Designed by James B. Long and built by Glen Wiley and Glenway Maxon (Wiley-Maxon Construction Company), it cost $2,484,000 (equivalent to $46.76 million in 2024), plus an early completion bonus of $56,400 (equivalent to $1,061,600.8 in 2024). Constructed of reinforced concrete, the 5,183-foot-long (1,580 m) bridge (6,657 feet (2,029 m) including spans over land) has 27 river piers, 22 approach piers, a 38-foot-wide (12 m) two-lane roadway, and a 6-foot-wide (1.8 m) sidewalk. 100,000 cubic yards (76,000 m^{3}) of concrete and 8 million pounds of steel reinforcing rods were used, and coffer dams were built to aid in construction. Each span consists of three separate concrete ribs connected at five points by horizontal concrete struts, with the longest span measuring 185 feet (56 m).

Tolls of 25 cents per vehicle were charged when the bridge first opened (equivalent to $4.71 in 2024) and ended on January 31, 1943, when the bond issue was retired. Some time after World War II, the original bridge lights were replaced with newer lighting. Two of the original bronze light fixtures can still be seen on the front lawn of the Frank Sahd Salvage Center along Route 462 in Columbia.

=== Current ===
In the 1970s, the state considered closing the bridge permanently due to the recently constructed Wright's Ferry Bridge nearby, but local residents objected. In the mid-1970s, it was given a major overhaul instead, and was closed only temporarily. A few years later, the bridge was once again closed briefly so that a weather-resistant coating could be applied to the roadway. Today, the bridge is maintained by PennDOT and is still considered the world's longest concrete multiple-arch bridge. Its annual average daily traffic (AADT) was 10,350 as of 2004. It is the fifth bridge to span the river at this general location.

As of the first quarter of 2020, PennDOT said plans were underway to restore the bridge, while also: improving roadway intersections at both ends, connecting pedestrian and bicycle paths to river-side parks, and possibly addressing annual mayfly swarms by adding lights beneath the bridge. The project has an estimated $54 million cost and construction was projected to begin in the winter of 2022–2023. In June 2023, an inspection of the bridge revealed cracks in the floor beams and columns that support the deck. The discovery resulted in a weight restriction of 10 short tons (9.1 tonnes) being applied, except for emergency vehicles that need to cross. A PennDOT spokesman said the bridge is safe and the limit is to keep the deterioration from getting worse. Interim repairs are planned and, with an expected need for redesign, the already-scheduled bridge rehabilitation is being pushed back to 2025.

The other present-day Columbia-Wrightsville bridge is the Wright's Ferry Bridge, the sixth bridge to cross the river between the two towns. Also known as the Route 30 bridge, it stands about one-half mile (800 m) north of the Veterans Memorial Bridge. (Wright's Ferry was one of the original names of Columbia.) G.A. & F.C. Wagman, Inc. began its construction in March 1969, and the bridge opened on November 21, 1972. It was commissioned by the Commonwealth of Pennsylvania in the 1960s to relocate Route 30 and bypass the river towns of Wrightsville and Columbia. Costing $12 million, it is constructed of reinforced concrete and steel and has 46 equal sections on 45 piers. US 30 crosses it as an expressway (4-lane divided highway), and there is no walkway. Tolls were never collected on this bridge. About a year after its opening, the bridge was shut down briefly so that an experimental weather-resistant coating could be applied to its roadway.

== Previous bridges ==
=== First bridge ===
Construction of the first Columbia–Wrightsville Bridge was begun in 1812 and completed December 5, 1814, by J. Wolcott, H. Slaymaker, S. Slaymaker at a total cost of $231,771 (equal to $3,476,197 today), which was underwritten by the newly formed Columbia Bank and Bridge Company. The bridge was 5,690 feet (1,730 m) long and 30 feet (9.1 m) wide and had 54 piers and twin carriageways. Constructed of wood and stone, the covered bridge also included a wooden roof, a whitewashed interior and openings in its wooden sides to admit light and allow a view of the river and surrounding areas. It stood immediately south of the present-day Wright's Ferry Bridge along Route 30. Tolls were $1.50 (equivalent to $22.5 in 2024) for a wagon and six horses, and six cents for pedestrians (equivalent to $0.9 in 2024). It was considered the longest covered bridge in the world at the time. The bridge accommodated east–west traffic across the Susquehanna River for 14 years before being destroyed by ice, high water and severe weather on February 5, 1832.

=== Second bridge ===
Construction of the second Columbia–Wrightsville Bridge, another covered bridge, started mid-1832 and was completed in 1834 (opening on July 8, 1834) by James Moore and John Evans at a cost of $157,300, equal to $4,954,426 today. It was 5,620 feet (1,710 m) long and 28 feet (8.5 m) wide and also enjoyed the distinction of being the world's longest covered bridge. The wood and stone structure had 27 piers, a carriageway, walkway, and two towpaths to guide canal traffic across the river. Tolls were $1.00 for a wagon and 6 horses (equivalent to $31.5 in 2024), and 6 cents per pedestrian (equivalent to $1.89 in 2024). Much of the mostly oak timber used in its construction was salvaged from the previous bridge. Its roof was covered with shingles, its sides with weatherboard, and its interior was whitewashed.

The structure was modified in 1840 by the Canal Company at a cost of $40,000 (equal to $1,259,867 today) concurrent with the construction of the Wrightsville Dam. Towpaths of different levels and with sidewalls were added to prevent horses from falling into river, as happened several times when the river flooded. The roof of the lower path formed the floor of upper path. In this way, canal boats were towed across the river from the Pennsylvania Canal on the Columbia side to the Susquehanna and Tidewater Canal at Wrightsville.

Sometime after 1846, a double-track railway was added, linking the Philadelphia and Columbia Railroad to the Northern Central Railway. Due to fear of fire caused by locomotives, rail cars were pulled across the bridge by teams of mules or horses.

==== The second bridge's role during the Civil War ====
To prevent the advance of Confederate troops across the river from the Wrightsville (York County) side during the Civil War, the bridge was burned by Union militia under Maj. Granville O. Haller and Col. Jacob G. Frick on June 28, 1863. Civilian volunteers from Columbia had mined the bridge at the fourth span from the Wrightsville side, originally hoping to drop the whole 200-foot (61 m) span into the river, but when the charges were detonated, only small portions of the support arch splintered, leaving the span passable. As Confederates advanced onto the bridge, Union forces set fire to it near the Wrightsville side. Earlier they had saturated the structure with crude oil from a Columbia refinery.

The entire structure soon caught fire and completely burned in six hours. Confederate generals Jubal A. Early and John B. Gordon had originally planned to save the bridge despite orders from General Robert E. Lee to burn it, and Union forces under the command of Colonel Jacob G. Frick had burned the bridge, originally hoping to defend and save it. Afterwards, the Columbia Bank and Bridge Company appealed to the federal government for reimbursement for damages incurred from the bridge burning, but none were ever paid. Conservative estimates put the cost of damages with interest today at well over $170 million.

In 1864, the bank sold all interest in the bridge and bridge piers to the Pennsylvania Railroad for $57,000, equal to $1,145,943 today.

=== Third bridge ===
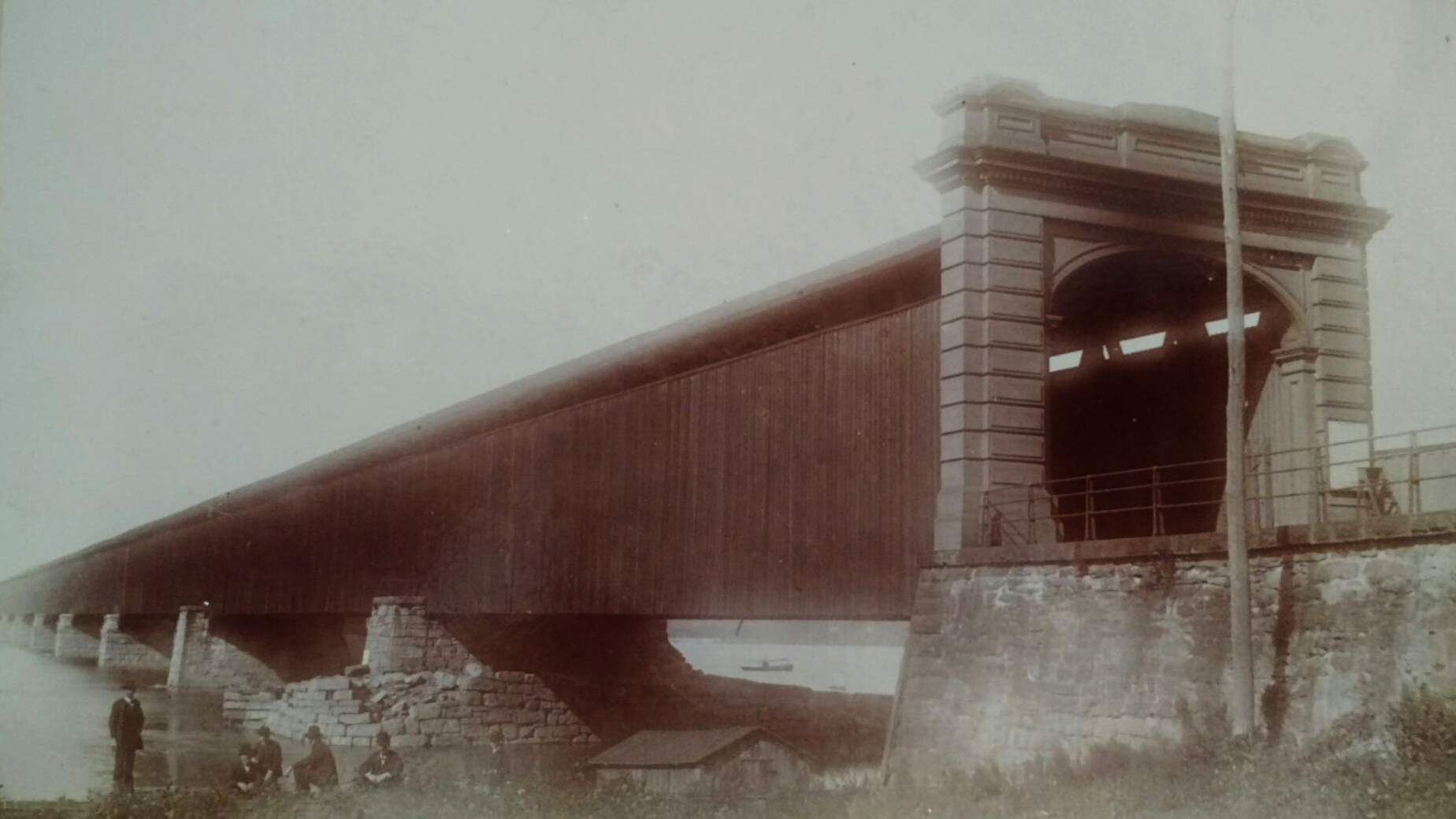
Third bridge, before destruction

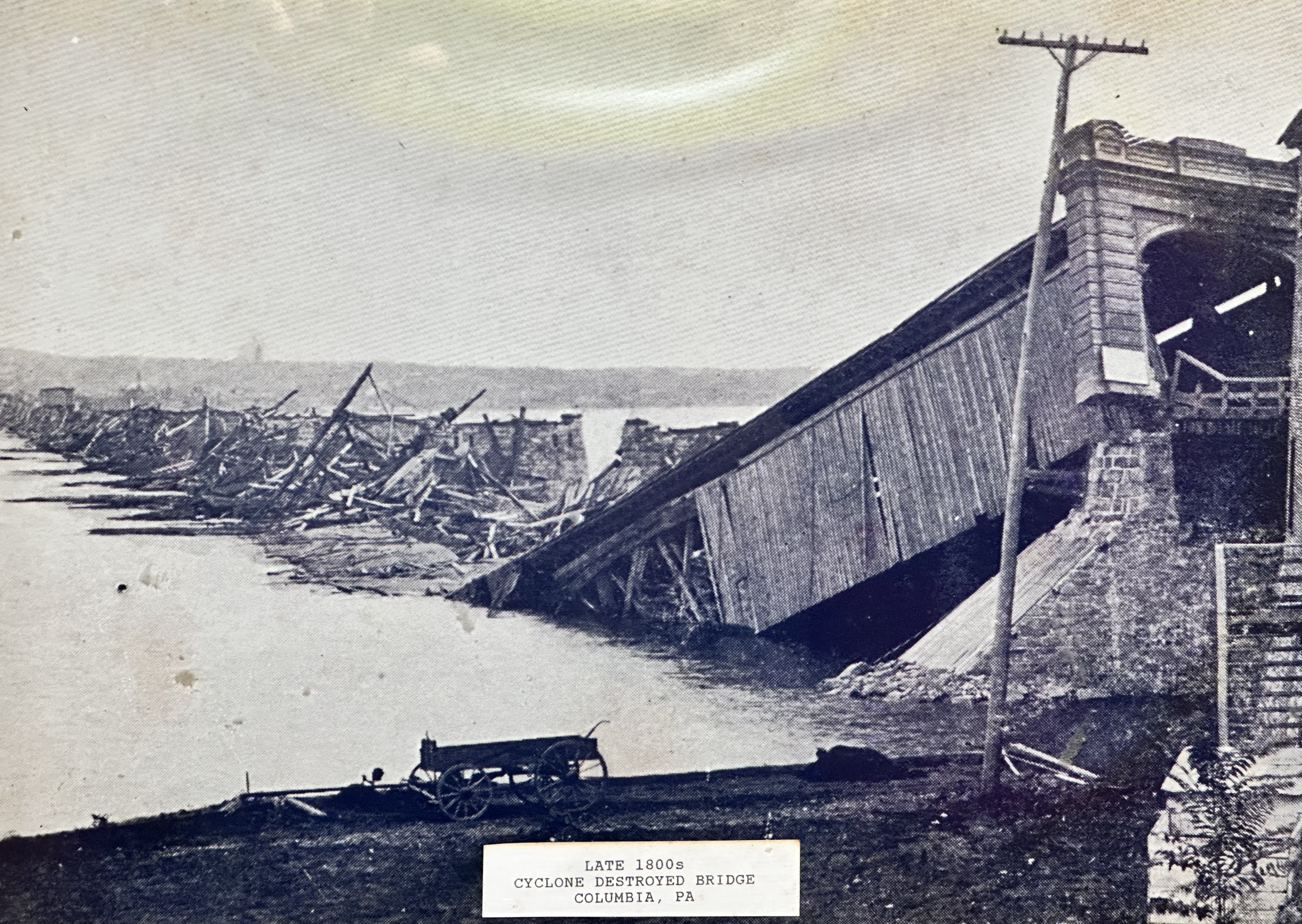
Wreckage of the third bridge, 1896

Construction of the third Columbia-Wrightsville bridge was started in 1868 by the Pennsylvania Railroad. The covered bridge (5,390 feet long) was completed later that year at a cost of $400,000, equal to $9,449,000 today. Built of stone, wood, and steel, it included 27 piers, a carriageway, railway, and walkway. It was destroyed on September 30, 1896, by the 1896 Cedar Keys hurricane.

=== Fourth bridge ===
Postcard of the fourth bridge

Construction of the fourth Columbia-Wrightsville bridge, known as the Pennsylvania Railroad "Iron Bridge," started April 16, 1897, and was completed May 11, and was considered the fastest bridge-building job in the world at the time. A steel truss bridge made of 200-foot-long (61 m) prefabricated sections, it was designed to be resistant to fire, ice, water and wind, elements that had destroyed previous wooden structures. Like the previous bridges, tolls were collected to recover a portion of the half-million dollar investment, equal to $18,898,000 today. Built on the same 27 piers as the previous two bridges, it opened June 7, 1897. The iron and prefabricated steel structure had a railway to carry rail traffic for the York Branch of the Pennsylvania Railroad, and twin carriageways that were shared with pedestrians. Tolls were 20 cents (equivalent to $7.56 in 2024) for vehicles (plus four cents per passenger; equivalent to $1.51 in 2024) and three cents for pedestrians (equivalent to $1.13 in 2024).

The bridge remained uncompleted because a planned upper deck was never built. With the completion of the Lincoln Highway in 1925, vehicular traffic routinely jammed in the late 1920s when vehicles had to wait for trains to pass before crossing the bridge, since the bridge was shared with rail traffic. A fifth bridge (Veterans' Memorial Bridge) was planned and erected to accommodate vehicular and pedestrian traffic. The "Iron Bridge" carried passenger trains until 1954 and freight traffic until March 13, 1958, and was dismantled for scrap starting in 1963 and ending in November 1964. Its stone piers, dating to pre-Civil War times, still stand today, running parallel to the north side of the Veterans' Memorial Bridge.

== See also ==
- List of bridges documented by the Historic American Engineering Record in Pennsylvania
- List of crossings of the Susquehanna River
