= Harriet Baker =

American evangelist (1829–1913)

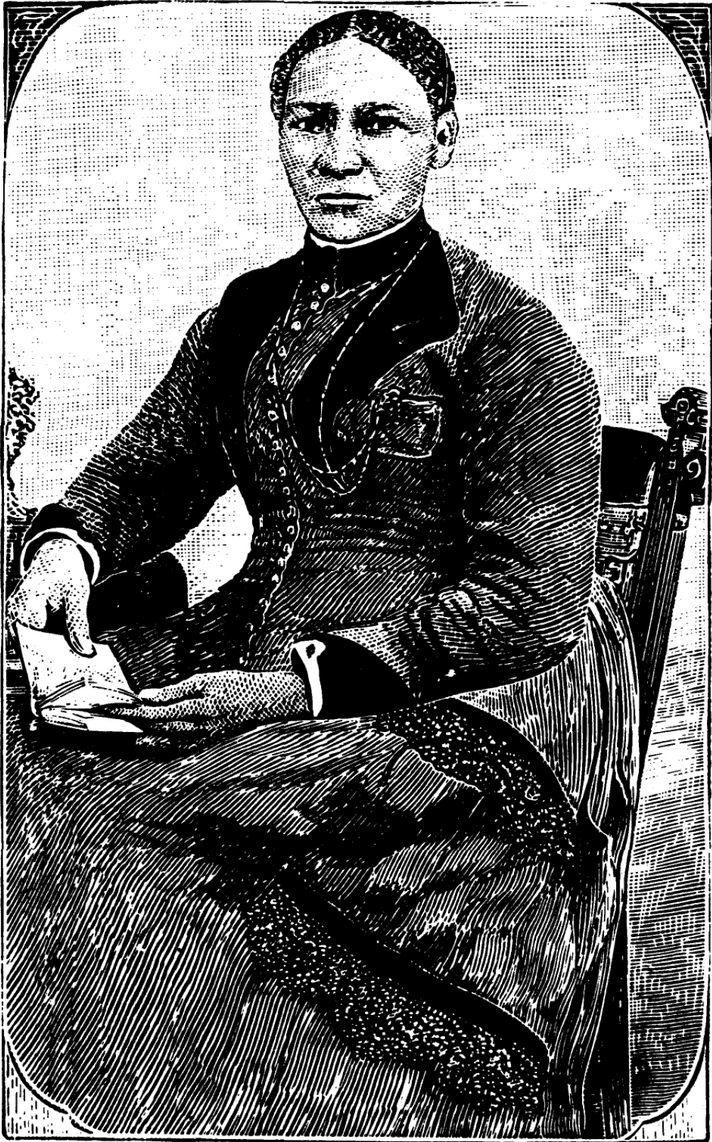
- Baker in 1892
- Born: Harriet Ann Cole; 1829; Havre de Grace, Maryland, US
- Died: March 1, 1913 (aged 83–84); Allentown, Pennsylvania, US
- Resting place: Greenwood Cemetery; Allentown, Pennsylvania, US
- Occupation: Evangelist
- Organization: African Methodist Episcopal Church (AME Church)
- Known for: One of the first Black women authorized to preach in the US
- Spouse: William Baker (m. 1845)

Harriet Ann Baker (née Cole; 1829 – March 1, 1913) was an American evangelist and one of the first African American women to serve as a preacher, in the African Methodist Episcopal Church. In 1914, her mission in Allentown, Pennsylvania, became the home of the St. James AME Zion Church, built in 1936.

== Biography ==
Harriet Ann Cole was born into freedom in Havre de Grace, Maryland, in 1829. She was one of seven children born to William Cole and Harriet Eskins. Her parents were emancipated slaves, and throughout Baker's childhood, the family lived in fear of being forcibly returned to slavery. In 1842 at the age of 13, she became an evangelical Christian, converting at a women's prayer meeting. In October 1845, she married an enslaved man, William Baker. In 1847, they fled the slave state of Maryland for Columbia, Pennsylvania, walking 48 miles to freedom while carrying their 7-week-old daughter. Tracked down by slave catchers, the Bakers resisted, and Harriet was knocked unconscious in the struggle. She recalled that the attackers aimed pistols at her and pulled the triggers, but the pistols all misfired. Put on trial in Philadelphia, her husband was confirmed to be a fugitive slave, but abolitionists raised funds to pay for his freedom.

== Preaching ==
While living quietly with her family in Columbia in 1872, Baker felt called to become a preacher. The African Methodist Episcopal Church did not permit female preachers at the time, and her husband and community members initially disapproved of her decision to preach. Nevertheless, she persisted, learned to read and write, and traveled to communities around Pennsylvania, preaching to racially mixed congregations. She preached in Columbia and Lebanon and gradually gained acceptance from congregations and clergy alike. Baker received an official appointment as a pastor of the St. Paul's AME Church on South 10th Street in Lebanon in 1889. She received authority to preach from AME bishops John M. Brown, Richard H. Cain, Jabez P. Campbell, T. M. D. Ward, and Henry McNeal Turner. Five years after her husband's death in Lebanon in 1892, Baker moved to Allentown, Pennsylvania, where she founded the Bethel Mission and preached there from 1900 to 1913. Her mission became the first home of St. James A.M.E. Zion Church, built in 1936. She made 5,000 converts and is one of the first African American woman preachers.

== Death and legacy ==
Baker died in Allentown on March 1, 1913, at the age of 84. She is buried in Allentown's Greenwood Cemetery. The Colored Lady Evangelist: Being the Life, Labors, and Experiences of Mrs. Harriet A. Baker by the Rev. John H. Acornley was privately published in Brooklyn in 1892. On May 4, 1990, the Pennsylvania Historical and Museum Commission dedicated a historical marker in her honor at the St. James A.M.E. Zion Church in Allentown.
