= National Watch and Clock Library =

Fortunat Mueller-Maerki Library & Research Center is one of the world's pre-eminent libraries devoted to horology and is located in Columbia, Pennsylvania, United States.

It is operated by the National Association of Watch and Clock Collectors, Inc., for the benefit of both the public and the members of the association. It is housed in the same building as the National Watch and Clock Museum.

The library is open to the public, members of whom may use the collection on the premises, and are invited to bring their own watches and clocks if they would like to ask the staff a question for a fee. Books are only lent to members of the NAWCC. The collection is open to researchers, members and the public alike.

== The collection ==
The collection covers material on timekeeping, time and timekeepers in around dozen different languages. In addition to its book collection of about 10,000 titles (some of them dating back to the 16th century), the library has over 1,000 different videos (both VCR and DVD formats), a comprehensive collection of horological periodicals (both current and historic) from around the world, many thousands of historic catalogs of watches and clocks, as well as large quantities of archival material chronicling the history of timekeepers, including the research papers of many prominent American horological scholars of the past.
