= Wright's Ferry Bridge =

Bridge over the Susquehanna River in Pennsylvania, U.S.

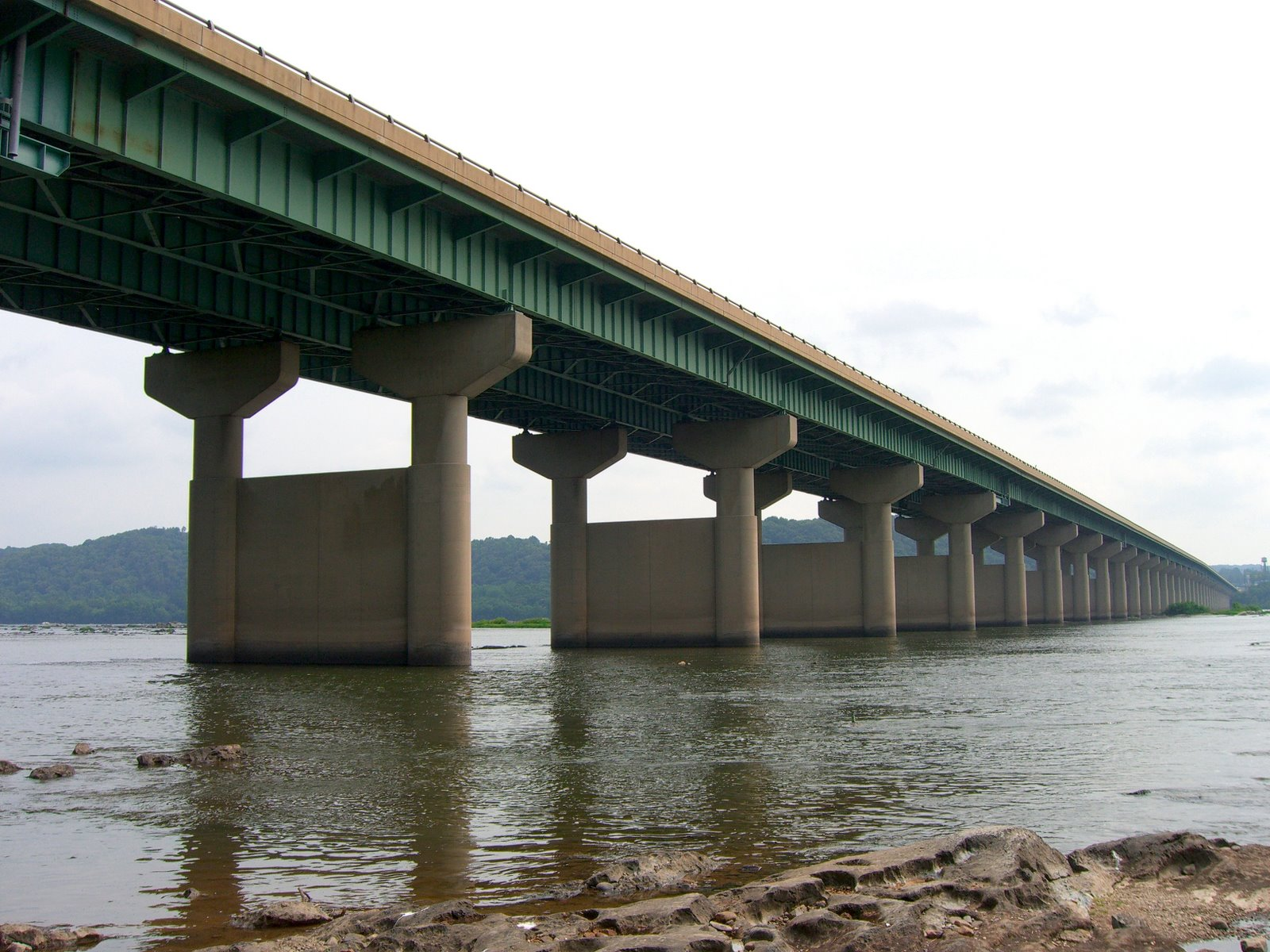
- Coordinates: 40.036°N 76.523°W
- Carries: US 30
- Crosses: Susquehanna River
- Locale: Wrightsville, Pennsylvania and Columbia, Pennsylvania
- Other name(s): Susquhanna River Bridge, Route 30 Bridge, Route 30 Intercounty Bridge
- Maintained by: PennDOT

Characteristics
- Design: reinforced concrete and steel; divided four-lane highway
- Longest span: 22 equal sections approximately 500ft long on two spans (11 each direction) on 45 piers

History
- Opened: November 21, 1972

Statistics
- Toll: none

Location
- Interactive map of Wright's Ferry Bridge

The Wright's Ferry Bridge carries U.S. Route 30 (US 30) over the Susquehanna River between Columbia and Wrightsville, Pennsylvania. The "Wright's Ferry" in its name commemorates the first ferry across the Susquehanna River.

This bridge is considered the sixth Columbia–Wrightsville Bridge; it complements the fifth one, which still carries Lincoln Highway traffic. (Note: Many digital maps label the Route 30 stretch west of this bridge with the "Lincoln Highway" title, though it's Pennsylvania Route 462 west of the river – sometimes also labeled as such – that holds the proper identity as Lincoln Highway. (Smith, Stephen H. (March 27, 2013). "Haines Shoe House will be a June 23rd Lunch Stop on 100th Anniversary Lincoln Highway Auto Tour". York Daily Record. "From The York Dispatch issue of Fri. Nov. 24, 1972 back page: With the opening of the full 20-miles extending from a point near Thomasville to Columbia on the Lancaster County side of the river, the new artery now becomes officially designated as U.S. 30... the hard-traveled highway now becomes Pennsylvania Traffic Route 462 but retains its nationwide identity as the Lincoln Highway."))

== History and notable features ==
Also known informally and locally as the Route 30 bridge, it was commissioned by the Commonwealth of Pennsylvania during the 1960s to relocate US 30 and bypass the river towns of Wrightsville and Columbia. Construction began in March 1969; G.A. & F.C. Wagman, Inc. was the general contractor used for the project.

The bridge was completed in 1972 at a cost of $12 million and opened November 21, 1972 under its present commemorative historical name, with Wright's Ferry being both the historic ferry's and one of Columbia's former names.

It was built using reinforced concrete and steel and has forty-six equal sections that are supported by forty-five piers. US 30 crosses it as a divided four-lane roadway.

Approximately a year after its opening, the bridge was shut down briefly so that an experimental weather-resistant coating could be applied to its roadway. Tolls were never collected on this bridge, the sixth to have crossed the river in this general location.

== See also ==
- List of crossings of the Susquehanna River
