= Columbia, Pennsylvania =

Borough in Pennsylvania, US

- Borough
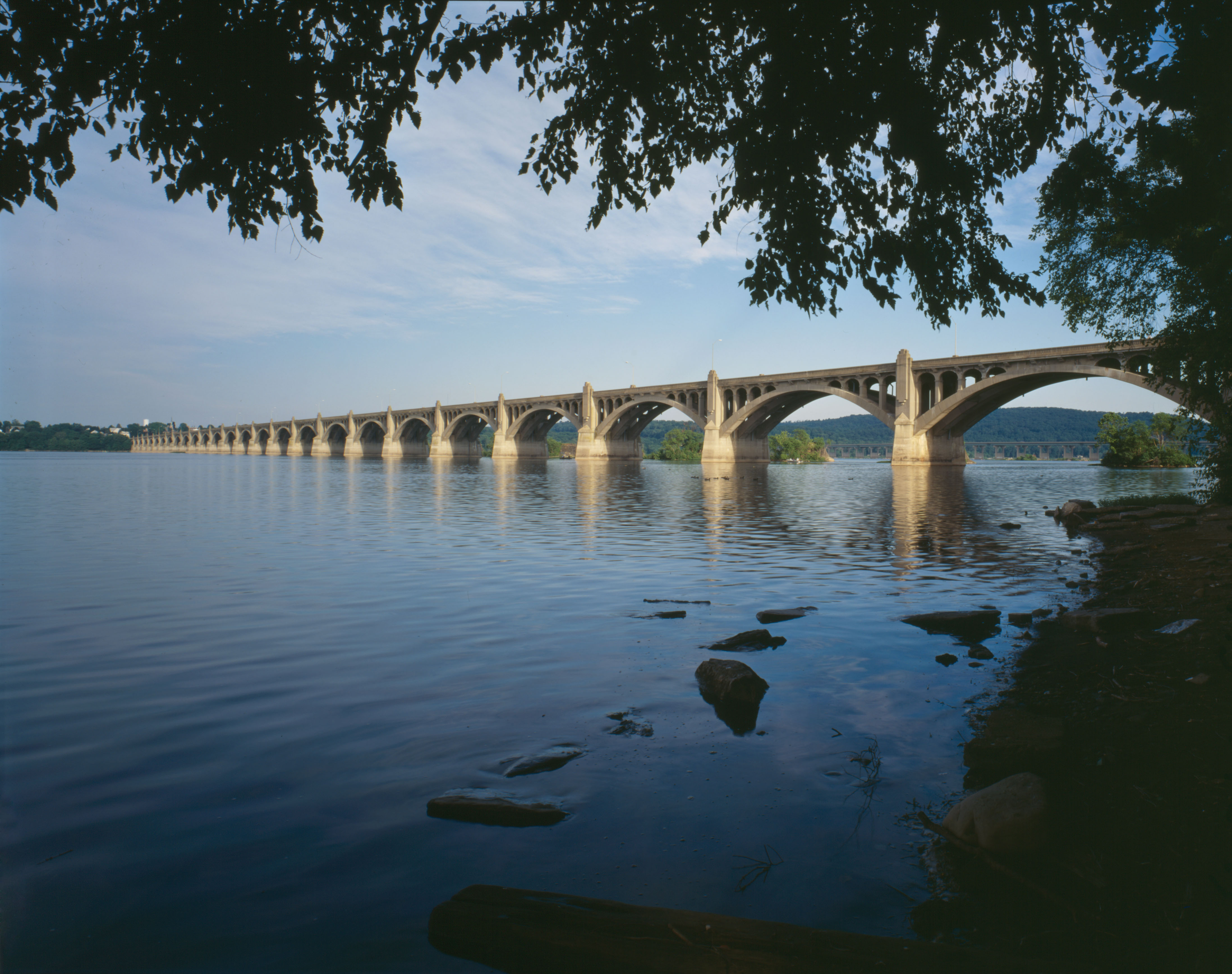
- Columbia–Wrightsville Veterans Memorial Bridge over the Susquehanna River

- Flag Logo

- Location of Columbia in Lancaster County, Pennsylvania

- Location in Pennsylvania Location in the United States
- Coordinates: 40°01′59″N 76°29′48″W
- Country: United States
- State: Pennsylvania
- County: Lancaster

Area
  - Total: 2.42 sq mi (6.27 km^{2})
  - Land: 2.41 sq mi (6.25 km^{2})
  - Water: 0.0077 sq mi (0.02 km^{2})
- Elevation: 361 ft (110 m)

Population (2020)
  - Total: 10,207
  - Density: 4,228.4/sq mi (1,632.61/km^{2})
- Time zone: UTC-5 (EST)
  - Summer (DST): UTC-4 (EDT)
- ZIP Code: 17512
- Area codes: 717 and 223
- FIPS code: 42-15384
- Website: www.columbiapa.net

Columbia, formerly Wright's Ferry, is a borough (town) in Lancaster County, Pennsylvania, United States. As of the 2020 census, it had a population of 10,222. It is 28 miles (45 km) southeast of Harrisburg, on the east (left) bank of the Susquehanna River, across from Wrightsville and York County and just south of U.S. Route 30.

The settlement was founded in 1726 by Colonial English Quakers from Chester County, led by entrepreneur and evangelist John Wright. Establishment of the eponymous Wright's Ferry, the first commercial Susquehanna crossing in the region, inflamed territorial conflict with neighboring Maryland but brought growth and prosperity to the small town, which was just a few votes shy of becoming the new United States' capital.

Though besieged for a short while by Civil War destruction, Columbia remained a lively center of transport and industry throughout the 19th century, and was once the terminus of the Pennsylvania Canal. Later, however, the Great Depression and 20th-century changes in economy and technology sent the borough into economic decline. It is notable today as the site of one of the world's few museums devoted entirely to horology.

== History ==
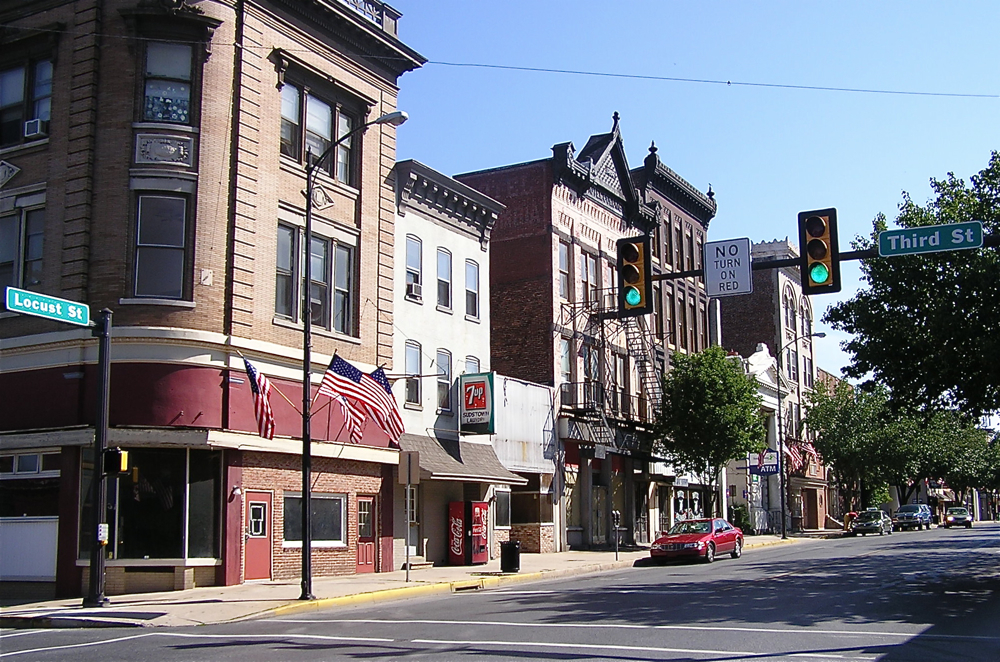
Downtown Columbia

=== Early history ===
The area around present-day Columbia was originally populated by Native American tribes, most notably the Susquehannocks, who migrated to the area between 1575 and 1600 after separating from the Iroquois Confederacy. They established villages just south of Columbia, in what is now Washington Boro, as well as claiming at least hunting lands as far south as Maryland and northern Virginia.

=== First Western settlements ===
In 1724, John Wright, an English Quaker, traveled to the Columbia area (then a part of Chester County) to explore the land and proselytize to a Native American tribe, the Shawnee, who had established a settlement along Shawnee Creek. Wright built a log cabin nearby on a tract of land first granted to George Beale by William Penn in 1699, and stayed for more than a year. The area was then known as "Shawanatown".

When Wright returned in 1726 with companions Robert Barber and Samuel Blunston, they began developing the area, Wright building a house about a hundred yards from the edge of the Susquehanna River in the area of today's South Second and Union streets. Susanna Wright later built Wright's Ferry Mansion, what is now the oldest existing house in Columbia, dating to 1738. She lived in this house with her brother James and his wife Rhoda, and possibly the first of their many children. The home is open for tours as a house museum and is located at Second and Cherry streets.

Robert Barber constructed a sawmill in 1727 and later built a home near the river on the Washington Boro Pike, along what is now Route 441. The home still stands, across from the Columbia wastewater treatment plant, and is the second oldest in the borough (after Wright's Ferry Mansion).

Samuel Blunston constructed a mansion called Bellmont atop the hill next to North Second Street, near Chestnut Street, at the location of the present-day Rotary Park playground. Upon his death, Blunston willed the mansion to Susanna Wright, who had become a close friend. She lived there, occasionally visiting brother James, ministering to the Native Americans, and raising silkworms for the local silk industry, until her death in 1784 at the age of 87. The residence was demolished in the late 1920s to allow for construction of the Veterans Memorial Bridge.

In 1729, after Wright had petitioned William Penn's son to create a new county, the provincial government took land from Chester County to establish Lancaster County, the fourth county in Pennsylvania. County residents – Indians and colonists alike – regularly traveled to Wright's home to file papers and claims, seek government assistance and redress of issues, and register land deeds. The area was particularly attractive to Pennsylvania Dutch settlers. During this time, the town was called "Wright's Ferry".

=== Wright's Ferry ===
In 1730, John Wright was granted a patent to operate a ferry across the Susquehanna River, subsequently established (with Barber and Blunston) as Wright's Ferry. He also built a ferry house and a two-story log tavern, north of Locust Street, on Front Street, in Philadelphia.

The ferry itself originally consisted of two dugout canoes fastened together with carriage and wagon wheels and drawn by cattle. Crossings could be a dangerous enterprise. When several oxen were moved at once, the canoeist guided a lead animal with a rope so that the others would follow; if, however, the lead animal became confused and started swimming in circles, the other animals followed until they tired and eventually drowned.

Typical fares in the 1700s were:

- Coach with four passengers, drawn by five horses – nine shillings;
- Four-horse wagon – three shillings and nine pence;
- Man and horse – six pence

Fares were reduced in 1787 due to competition from Anderson's Ferry, located further upstream near Marietta. Wright's Ferry was located immediately south of the present-day Veterans Memorial Bridge along Route 462. In later years, Wright rented the ferry to others before finally selling it.

Traffic heading west from Lancaster, Philadelphia, and other nearby towns regularly traveled through Columbia, using the ferry to cross the Susquehanna. As traffic flow increased, the ferry grew, to the point of including canoes, rafts, flatboats, and eventually steamboats; it became capable of handling Conestoga wagons and other large vehicles. Due to the volume of traffic, however, wagons, freight, supplies and people often became backed up, creating a waiting period of several days to cross the river. With 150 to 200 vehicles lined up on the Columbia side, ferrymen used chalk to number the wagons.

=== Cresap's War ===
Wright's Ferry was the first convenient crossing of the Susquehanna River in the region. At the time, however, southern Pennsylvania above the 40th parallel was claimed by the Province of Maryland, which took especial interest in the rural area around the ferry. Fearing an influx of Pennsylvanian settlers that could weaken Maryland's influence, Maryland colonist Thomas Cresap, under the aegis of Lord Baltimore, attempted to establish a competing ferry and a strong landholding presence around the Susquehanna. Pennsylvanians responded in kind; a violent attack on Cresap in October 1730 escalated the situation into a series of bitter (if not bloody) militia skirmishes and heated legal battles. The situation was not fully resolved until a London peace agreement in 1738, which cooled the colonies' territorial dispute and set the stage for the later codification of the Mason–Dixon line.

=== Becoming Columbia ===
Samuel Wright, son of James and Rhoda Wright, was born on May 12, 1754. He eventually became the town proprietor and created a public grounds company to administer the land. Through his trusteeship, the town's first water distribution system (later the Columbia Water Company) was established, as well as the Washington Institute (the town's first school of higher learning) and Locust Street Park, located at what is now Locust Street and Route 462.

In the spring of 1788, Samuel Wright had the area surveyed and formally laid out the town into 160 building lots, which were distributed by lottery at 15 shillings per ticket. "Adventurers", as purchasers were known, included speculators from many areas of the country. Wright and town citizens renamed the town "Columbia" in honor of Christopher Columbus in the hope of influencing the new United States Congress to select it as the nation's capital, a plan George Washington favored; a formal proposal to do so was made in 1789. Unfortunately for the town, when Congress voted in 1790, the final tally was one vote short. Later, Columbia narrowly missed becoming the capital of Pennsylvania; Harrisburg was chosen instead, since it was closer to the state's geographic center.

=== 19th century ===
==== Expansion, construction, and transportation ====
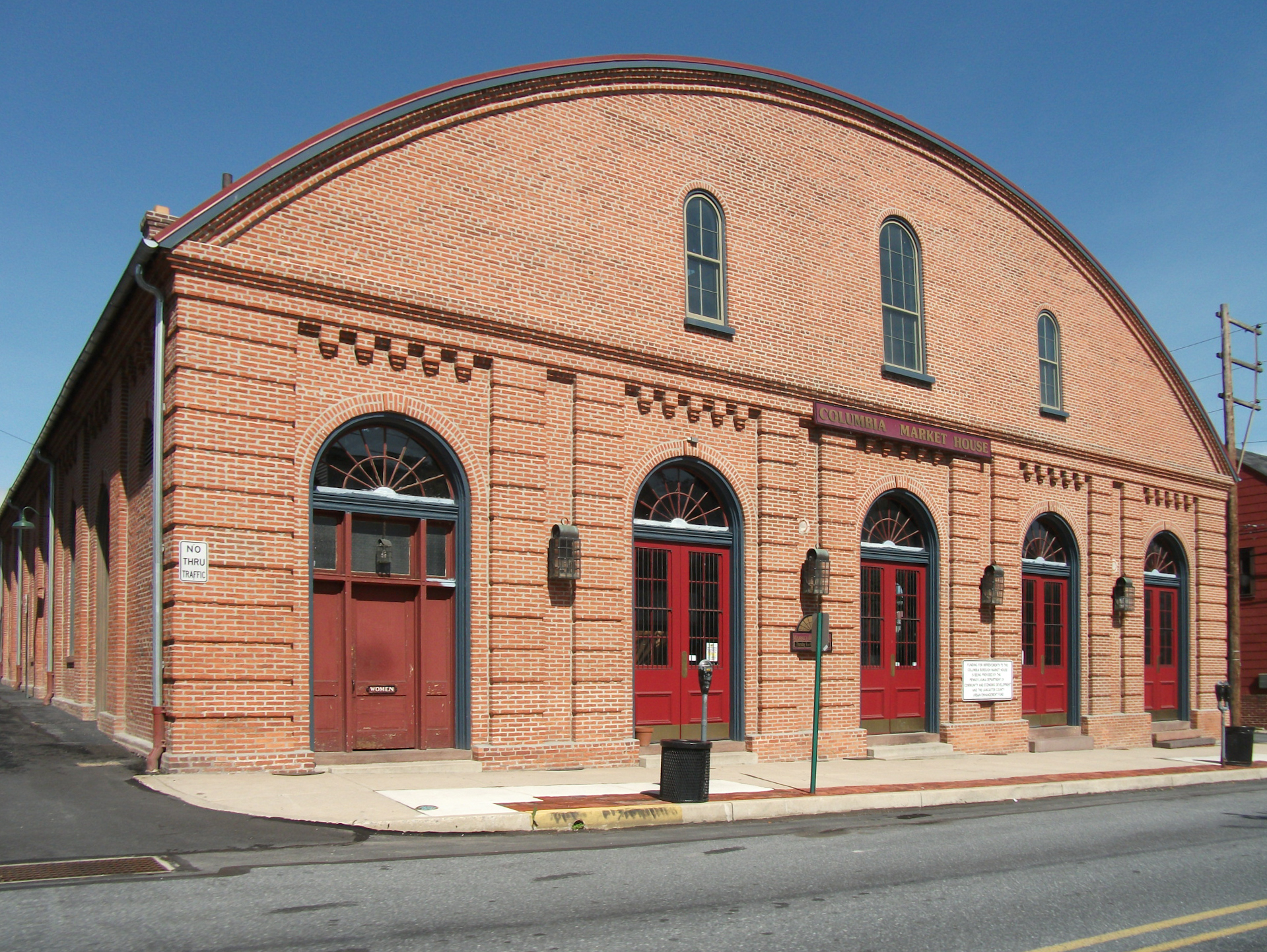
Columbia Market House in Columbia

English Anglicans, Scots-Irish Presbyterians, freed African slaves, German Lutherans, and descendants of French Huguenots came to outnumber the first Quaker settlers within a generation.

Columbia became an incorporated borough in 1814, formed out of Hempfield Township. The same year, the world's longest covered bridge was built across the Susquehanna to Wrightsville, facilitating traffic flow across the river and reducing the need for the ferry. The bridge was 5,690 feet (1,730 m) long and 30 feet (9.1 m) wide, and had 54 stone piers. After handling traffic across the Susquehanna for 18 years, it was destroyed by high water, ice, and severe weather in the winter of 1832. A replacement covered bridge, the Pennsylvania Railroad Bridge, was built within two years.

===== Public works =====
In February 1826, the Pennsylvania state legislature approved the package of legislation known as the Main Line of Public Works with the goal of connecting the width and breadth of Pennsylvania by the best and most reliable transportation known, water transport. The project started with the harder parts up the Juniata River and over the mountains being funded first. $300,000 in the funding was for the construction of a navigation that would be called the Pennsylvania Canal along the Susquehanna's eastern shore to bypass rapids and shallows and make the river navigable anywhere along its route. Also, as conceived, another 82-mile (132 km) canal would be dug from the terminus in Columbia to connect towns to the east with a terminus on the Delaware River at Philadelphia.

Across the Alleghenies, another canal would connect the Allegheny Portage Railroad (crossing the mountains) to the Ohio River and the Mississippi River. Like the Erie Canal, which was completed in 1825, the very year the legislation package came to be filed, the overall scheme was envisioned when water transport was the fastest means of travel over any long distance, was the best way to ship heavy bulk goods or cumbersome loads, and was before railways came to the public eye and their technology had been refined enough to become working propositions. In 1836 there were probably fewer than six railways in the world.

The navigations began in 1832 after several delays, and the work proceeded quickly. The Pennsylvania Canal began operating in 1833, beginning in Columbia and then stretching 40 miles (64 km) north to the junction of the Juniata River with the Susquehanna River. The intent was that goods and travelers could use the canal system to go west from Columbia to Pittsburgh, Lake Erie, Ohio, and [present-day] West Virginia along the Juniata Division, or by taking the main Susquehanna north to reach north-central Pennsylvania and Upstate New York.

The plan encountered difficulties. Engineering studies found no reasonably feasible way to provide enough water to keep an 82-mile canal to Philadelphia wet, much less support lock operations. When that was reported, the Pennsylvania Canal Commission came up with a new plan, one using the right of way authorized to build one of these newfangled railways that were making news. Their solution was the Philadelphia and Columbia Railroad, one of the first common carrier commercial railways to operate in the United States. Double-tracked, it utilized two inclined plane cable railways at steep rises near either end, and except for bypasses of that older technology unneeded with more powerful locomotives, the P&CR trackage is still in use today, as it passed to the Pennsylvania Railroad in 1857, along with most of the Pennsylvania Canal.

Canal boats could often be seen at the Bruner coal wharf, operated by H.F. Bruner & Sons at North Front and Bridge streets. The canal was originally planned to extend south from Columbia on the east side of the river, but local property owners objected. Instead, a two-tiered towpath was constructed along the south side of the bridge to transport boats across the river using horse and mule teams. The boats then linked with the Susquehanna and Tidewater Canal along the western shore at Wrightsville. This part of the canal system, which afforded passage to Baltimore or the Chesapeake and Delaware Canal, opened in 1840. Several years later, a small dam was constructed across the river to form a pool that allowed steamboats to tow the canal boats. Canals could not be used in winter due to ice and floods, which caused damage that had to be repaired in the spring. These limitations, combined with an increase in railroad traffic, led to the decline of the canals. The Columbia Canal closed in 1901, the same year that Wright's Ferry ceased to operate.

During this time, Columbia also became a stop on the Underground Railroad. Slaves seeking freedom were transported across the Susquehanna, fed and given supplies on their way north to other states and Canada. To slave hunters from the South, the slaves seemed to simply disappear, leading one hunter to declare that there "must be an underground railroad here."

Any idealistic view of abolitionism in Columbia is surely tested, however, by the occurrence of a significant race riot in 1834. The riot erupted on Saturday, Sunday and Monday evenings, August 16, 17 and 18, 1834. when white workers revolted against working alongside Black freedmen. Citing a document drafted by the rioters themselves, historian David Roediger explains that typical of other race riots of the period, white rioters feared "a plot by employers and abolitionists to open new trades to Blacks and 'to break down the distinctive barrier between the colors that the poor whites may gradually sink into the degraded condition of the Negroes - that, like them, they may be slaves and tools'." The rioters' declaration called for "colored freeholders" to be "singled out for removal from the Borough". The riot resulted in a large number of African American residents being forced from their homes and their property destroyed.

In 1834, another bridge was built by James Moore and John Evans at a cost of $157,300 (~$5.26 million in 2024). This bridge also enjoyed the distinction of being the world's longest covered bridge. The same year, construction began on the first railway line linking Columbia and Philadelphia, which subsequently became part of the Pennsylvania Railroad. Named the Philadelphia and Columbia Railroad, it officially opened in October 1834.

By 1852, regular rail transportation from Columbia to Baltimore, Philadelphia, Pittsburgh, and Harrisburg made the town the commercial center for the area halfway between the county seats of Lancaster and York.

==== Civil War ====
In early 1863, as the American Civil War raged, a number of local Black citizens enlisted in the 54th Massachusetts Infantry, a regiment composed of black soldiers serving under white officers. The unit achieved fame in an assault on Fort Wagner in South Carolina. Stephen Swails, one of its members, may have been the first African-American officer commissioned during the Civil War. Other local citizens fought in various regiments of the United States Colored Troops. Some of these veterans are buried in a cemetery located near Fifth Street.

On June 28, 1863, during the Gettysburg campaign, the replacement covered bridge was burned by Columbia residents and the Pennsylvania state militia to prevent Confederate soldiers of the Army of Northern Virginia from entering Lancaster County. General Robert E. Lee had hoped to invade Harrisburg from the rear and move eastward to Lancaster and Philadelphia, and in the process destroy railroad yards and other facilities. Under General Jubal A. Early's command and following Lee's orders, General John B. Gordon was to place Lancaster and the surrounding farming area "under contribution" for the Confederate Army's war supplies and to attack Harrisburg from the east side of the river, while another portion of Lee's army advanced from the west side. General Early was given orders to burn the bridge but hoped instead to capture it, while Union forces under the command of Colonel Jacob G. Frick and Major Granville O. Haller, hoping to save the bridge, were forced to burn it. Owners of the bridge petitioned Congress repeatedly for reimbursement well into the 1960s, but were denied payment.

With the Union Army of the Potomac hastening northward into Maryland and Pennsylvania, Robert E. Lee ordered his widely scattered forces to withdraw to Heidlersburg and Cashtown (not far from Gettysburg) to rendezvous with other contingents of the Confederate Army. The burning of the Columbia–Wrightsville Bridge thwarted one of Lee's goals for the invasion of Pennsylvania, and General Gordon later claimed the skirmish at Wrightsville reinforced the erroneous Confederate belief that the only defensive forces on hand were inefficient local militia, an attitude that carried over to the first day of the Battle of Gettysburg.

==== Postwar growth ====
After the wartime bridge burning, a tugboat, Columbia, was used to tow canal boats across the river. In 1868, yet another replacement covered bridge was built, but was destroyed by a hurricane in 1896. The next bridge, the Pennsylvania Railroad Bridge, was a steel open bridge which carried the tracks of the Pennsylvania Railroad and a two-lane roadway for cars. It was dismantled for scrap by November 1964, but its stone piers, which supported the Civil War-era bridge, can still be seen today, running parallel to the Veterans Memorial Bridge on Route 462. The piers have become the site of present-day "Flames Across the Susquehanna" bridge-burning reenactments sponsored by Rivertownes PA USA.

In 1875, a new three-story grand town hall opened, featuring a second-floor auditorium that seated over 900 and was used as an opera house. The second floor's ceiling was higher than those of the first and third floors; each level contained 60 windows. The building also included office shops, council chambers, storerooms and market stalls. A 140-foot-high (43 m) bell tower, holding the town clock, crowned the building. The clock was visible from all over the borough, and its bell was audible throughout the surrounding countryside. The building was destroyed by fire in February 1947, but was rebuilt as a one-story municipal building that exists today.

Trolley service for the borough and surrounding area was established in 1893, allowing Columbians to take advantage of economic opportunities in Lancaster and other nearby towns. Between 1830 and 1900, the borough's population increased from 2,046 to 12,316.

==== Flourishing industry ====
By the mid-19th century, Columbia had become a busy transportation hub with its ferry, bridge, canal, railroad and wharves. It was a major shipping transfer point for lumber, coal, grain, pig iron, and people. Important industries of the time included warehousing, tobacco processing, iron production, clockmaking, and boat building. Prominent local companies included the Ashley and Bailey Silk Mill, the Columbia Lace Mill, and H.F. Bruner & Sons.

From about 1854 to 1900, an industrial complex existed in and around Columbia, Marietta and Wrightsville that included 11 anthracite iron furnaces and related structures, as well as canal and railroad facilities servicing them. By 1887, that number had grown to 13 blast furnaces, all operating within a 3-mile (5 km) radius of Columbia. The furnaces, which produced pig iron, exemplified the technology of the day through their use of anthracite coal and hot blast for smelting iron ore, a process that dominated the iron industry before the widespread use of coke as a fuel. Since northeastern Pennsylvania was a rich source of anthracite coal, anthracite-fired furnaces using locally available iron ores were built throughout eastern Pennsylvania, helping to make the state a leader in iron production in the latter half of the 19th century. Lancaster County also became a leader in pig iron production during this time, with the river towns' complex of furnaces contributing significantly to its output.

=== 20th century ===
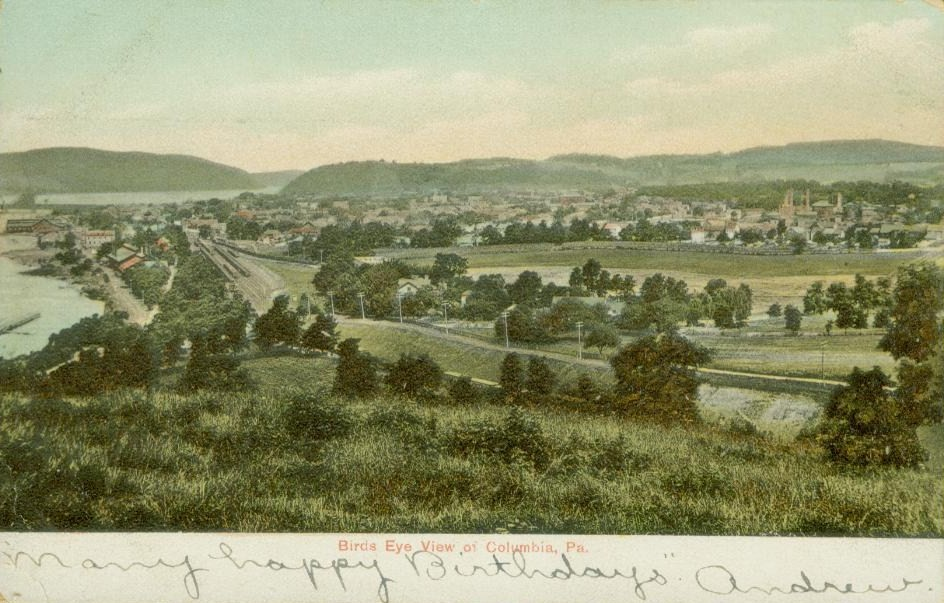
Columbia, about 1905

==== Changes in the new century ====
By 1900, the town's population had grown to over 12,000, with a 50% increase from 1880 to 1900. Some of the items produced by its industries were silk goods, lace, pipe, laundry machinery, stoves, iron toys, flour, lumber, and wagons. By this time Wright's Ferry had ceased its operations, having been supplanted by rail and bridge traffic.

In 1930, yet another bridge, the Veterans Memorial Bridge, was opened to improve traffic flow across the Susquehanna. It first opened as a toll bridge; to avoid the toll, in the coldest winter months some daring motorists would cross on the firmly frozen river. Later that same decade, many of the city's brick sidewalks were converted to concrete; the bronze plaques of the concrete installers are still visible today.

==== Economic decline ====
Locust Street in Columbia

The start of the 20th century brought economic challenge to Columbia as local industries declined. The lumber industry eventually disappeared as surrounding woodlands became depleted. As Chestnut Hill iron ores became scarce as well, the iron furnaces shut down. Eventually, the steel rolling mills also ceased operation. In 1906, the Pennsylvania Railroad opened a new facility in Enola, across the river from Harrisburg, which decreased the significance of Columbia's railroad. By 1920, the population had dropped over 10% to 10,836.

The Great Depression accelerated Columbia's economic slide. The Pennsylvania Railroad's service to the north and the south was eliminated. World War II increased employment, but did not bring long-term prosperity to the borough.

By 1960, population had returned to its 1900 level. In 1965 a detailed study of Columbia's basic strengths and weaknesses was released, but its suggestions went mostly unheeded. The Wright's Ferry Bridge, which opened in 1972, only served to divert traffic around Columbia. The growth and prosperity experienced in some Lancaster County towns bypassed Columbia for the remainder of the 20th century. Although the United States Census Bureau reported that as of the last year of the 20th century, the population of Columbia had been only 10,311 people, by 2010 this figure had grown to 10,400.

== Demographics ==
Historical population
Census	Pop.	Note	%±
1820	1,891		—
1830	2,046		8.2%
1840	2,719		32.9%
1850	4,140		52.3%
1860	5,007		20.9%
1870	6,461		29.0%
1880	8,312		28.6%
1890	10,599		27.5%
1900	12,316		16.2%
1910	11,454		−7.0%
1920	10,836		−5.4%
1930	11,349		4.7%
1940	11,547		1.7%
1950	11,993		3.9%
1960	12,075		0.7%
1970	11,237		−6.9%
1980	10,466		−6.9%
1990	10,701		2.2%
2000	10,311		−3.6%
2010	10,400		0.9%
2020	10,207		−1.9%
2021 (est.)	10,157	▼	−0.5%

=== 2020 census ===
As of the 2020 census, Columbia had a population of 10,207. The median age was 41.0 years. 21.1% of residents were under the age of 18 and 19.3% of residents were 65 years of age or older. For every 100 females there were 93.3 males, and for every 100 females age 18 and over there were 90.7 males age 18 and over.

99.6% of residents lived in urban areas, while 0.4% lived in rural areas.

There were 4,322 households in Columbia, of which 27.1% had children under the age of 18 living in them. Of all households, 34.1% were married-couple households, 22.8% were households with a male householder and no spouse or partner present, and 33.3% were households with a female householder and no spouse or partner present. About 34.7% of all households were made up of individuals and 16.0% had someone living alone who was 65 years of age or older.

There were 4,700 housing units, of which 8.0% were vacant. The homeowner vacancy rate was 2.3% and the rental vacancy rate was 5.9%.

Racial composition as of the 2020 census
Race	Number	Percent
White	7,721	75.6%
Black or African American	707	6.9%
American Indian and Alaska Native	39	0.4%
Asian	80	0.8%
Native Hawaiian and Other Pacific Islander	2	0.0%
Some other race	776	7.6%
Two or more races	882	8.6%
Hispanic or Latino (of any race)	1,798	17.6%

=== 2000 census ===
As of the census of 2000, there were 10,311 people, 4,287 households, and 2,589 families residing in the borough. The population density was 4,227.8 inhabitants per square mile (1,632.4/km^{2}). There were 4,595 housing units at an average density of 1,884.1 per square mile (727.5/km^{2}). The racial makeup of the borough was 91.34% White, 4.42% Black or African American, 0.18% Native American, 0.41% Asian, 0.05% Pacific Islander, 1.70% from other races, and 1.90% from two or more races. 4.49% of the population were Hispanic or Latino of any race.

There were 4,287 households, out of which 28.3% had children under the age of 18 living with them, 41.5% were married couples living together, 19.2% had a female householder with no husband present, and 39.6% were non-families. 33.7% of all households were made up of individuals, and 16.6% had someone living alone who was 65 years of age or older. The average household size was 2.35 and the average family size was 3.01.

In the borough the population was spread out, with 24.3% under the age of 18, 8.7% from 18 to 24, 29.2% from 25 to 44, 20.5% from 45 to 64, and 17.2% who were 65 years of age or older. The median age was 37 years. For every 100 females, there were 89.3 males. For every 100 females age 18 and over, there were 85.5 males.

The median income for a household in the borough was $32,385, and the median income for a family was $26,309. Males had a median income of $27,528 versus $22,748 for females. The per capita income for the borough was $14,626. About 11.5% of families and 11.9% of the population were below the poverty line, including 18.3% of those under age 18 and 10.6% of those age 65 or over.

== Geography ==
Columbia is located in western Lancaster County on the left (east) bank of the Susquehanna River. U.S. Route 30, a four-lane freeway, passes through the northern side of the borough, leading east 11 miles (18 km) to the Lancaster area and west 13 miles (21 km) to York. Harrisburg, the state capital, is 30 miles (48 km) to the northwest, up the Susquehanna. Pennsylvania Route 462 passes through the center of Columbia, leading east to Lancaster and west to York following the old route of US 30.

According to the U.S. Census Bureau, the borough of Columbia has an area of 2.4 square miles (6.3 km^{2}), of which 0.01 square miles (0.02 km^{2}), or 0.31%, are water.

It has a hot-summer humid continental climate (Dfa), and average monthly temperatures range from 30.9 °F (−0.6 °C) in January to 75.8 °F (24.3 °C) in July. The hardiness zone is 6b or 7a, depending upon elevation.

== Museums and historic sites ==
For over half a century, Columbia has been home to the headquarters of the National Association of Watch and Clock Collectors (NAWCC), whose campus on Poplar Street includes a clock tower, clock museum, library, research center, and "School of Horology," for training professional clock and watch repairers.

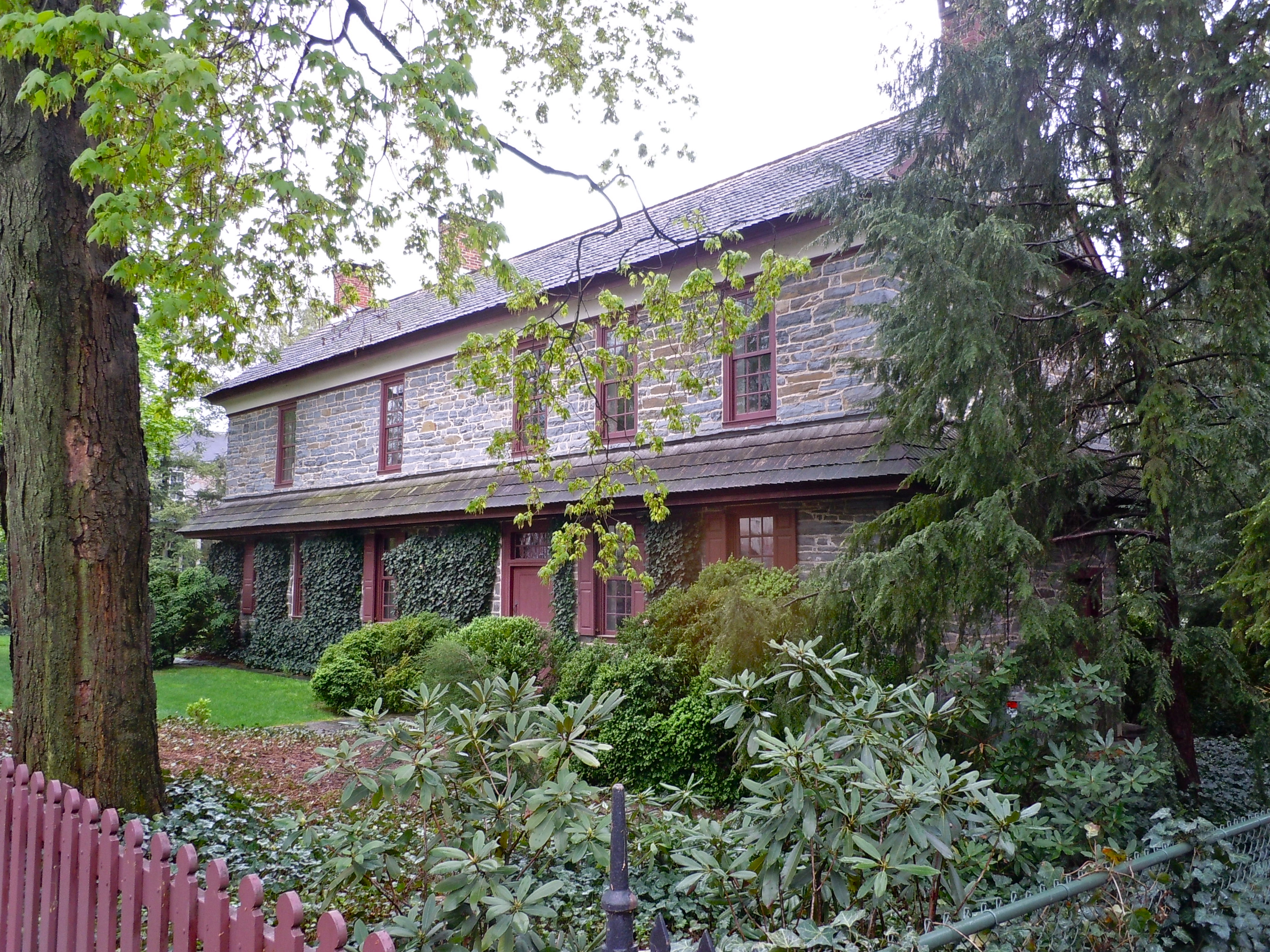
Wright's Ferry Mansion

=== Other notable sites ===
- Columbia Historic District
- Columbia Historic Preservation Society
- Columbia Market House
- Columbia Wagon Works
- Bachman and Forry Tobacco Warehouse
- First National Bank Museum
- Manor Street Elementary School
- Old Columbia-Wrightsville Bridge
- Wright's Ferry Mansion

== Schools ==
Schools in Columbia are part of the Columbia Borough School District.

Public Schools

- Park Elementary School
- Columbia Middle School (Taylor Campus and Hill Campus)
- Columbia High School

Private schools

- Our Lady of the Angels (K-8) of the Roman Catholic Diocese of Harrisburg - Holy Trinity School and Saint Peter School merged into Our Lady of the Angels in 1998.

=== Historical ===
- Cherry Street School
- Columbia Junior-Senior High School
- Holy Trinity School - Merged into OLA in 1998
- Manor Street School
- Poplar Street School
- St. Peter's School - Merged into OLA in 1998
- Taylor Elementary School
- Washington Institute

== Notable people ==
- Harriet Baker, evangelist
- Ralph Heller Beittel, composer
- Amelia Reynolds Long, author
- Mary Reeser, victim of possible Spontaneous Human Combustion.
- Edward C. Shannon, lieutenant governor of Pennsylvania
- Stephen Atkins Swails, soldier and politician
- Thomas Welsh, Civil War general
- Suzanne Westenhoefer, comedian
- Dean Young, poet
