= 129th Pennsylvania Infantry Regiment =

Union Army infantry regiment

129th Pennsylvania Volunteer Infantry
- Pennsylvania State Flag
- Active: August 15, 1862 to May 18, 1863
- Country: United States
- Allegiance: Union
- Branch: Infantry
- Engagements: Battle of Antietam; Battle of Fredericksburg; Battle of Chancellorsville

The 129th Pennsylvania Volunteer Infantry was an infantry regiment that served in the Union Army during the American Civil War.

== Service ==
The 129th Pennsylvania Infantry was organized at Camp Curtin near Harrisburg, Pennsylvania, and mustered in August 15, 1862 under the command of Colonel Jacob Gellert Frick.

The regiment was attached to 1st Brigade, 3rd Division, V Corps, Army of the Potomac.

The 129th Pennsylvania Infantry mustered out May 18, 1863.

== Detailed service ==
Moved to Washington, D.C., August 16, and duty there until September 12. Moved to Sharpsburg, Md and duty there until October 30. Reconnaissance from Sharpsburg to Smithfield, Va., October 16–17. Movement to Falmouth, Va., October 30 – November 19. Battle of Fredericksburg, Va., December 12–15. Burnside's 2nd Campaign, "Mud March," January 20–24, 1863. At Falmouth until April. Chancellorsville Campaign April 27 – May 6. Battle of Chancellorsville May 1–5.

== Casualties ==
The regiment lost a total of 83 men during service; 3 officers and 37 enlisted men killed or mortally wounded, 1 officer and 42 enlisted men died of disease.

== Commanders ==
- Colonel Jacob Gellert Frick

== Notable members ==
- Private Charles F. Chidsey – First mayor of Easton, Pennsylvania, member of the Pennsylvania House of Representatives
- Colonel Jacob Gellert Frick – Medal of Honor recipient for action at the Battle of Chancellorsville

== See also ==
- List of Pennsylvania Civil War Units
- Pennsylvania in the Civil War
