= Columbia Borough School District =

School district in Pennsylvania

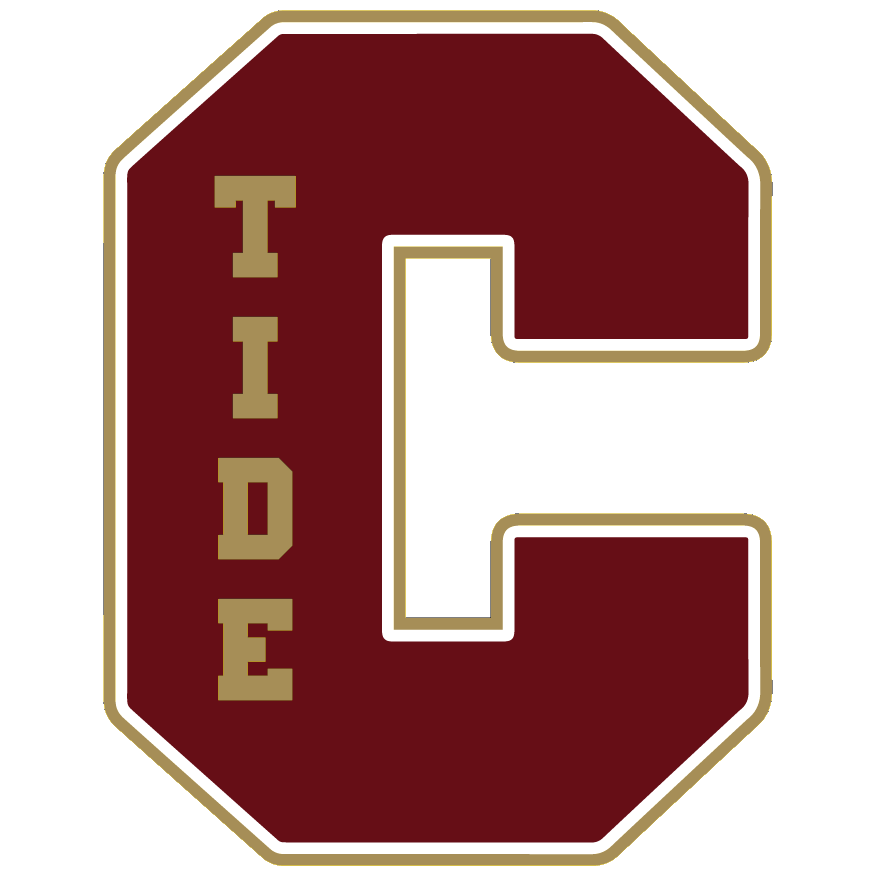

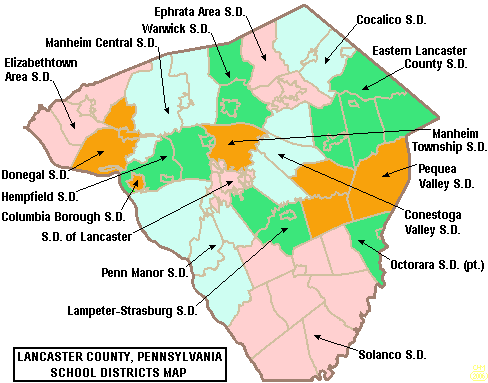
- Map of Lancaster County, Pennsylvania public school districts. Columbia Borough School District is the small orange area surrounded by green at the left (west) side of the map.

Address
- 200 North Fifth Street Columbia, Lancaster, Pennsylvania, 17512; United States

District information
- Type: Public

Students and staff
- District mascot: Crimson Tide

Other information
- Website: Columbia Borough School District

The Columbia Borough School District is a diminutive, urban, public school district serving the Borough of Columbia in Lancaster County, Pennsylvania, United States. Columbia Borough School District encompasses approximately 2 square miles. According to 2000 federal census data, it serves a resident population of 10,311.It is a member of Lancaster-Lebanon Intermediate Unit (IU) 13.

The district operates four schools: Park Elementary School, Columbia Middle School - Taylor Campus, Columbia Middle School - Hill Campus, and Columbia High School.

Previously, it had two elementary schools (Park and Taylor) and Columbia Junior-Senior High School.
