= Bachman and Forry Tobacco Warehouse =

- U.S. National Register of Historic Places
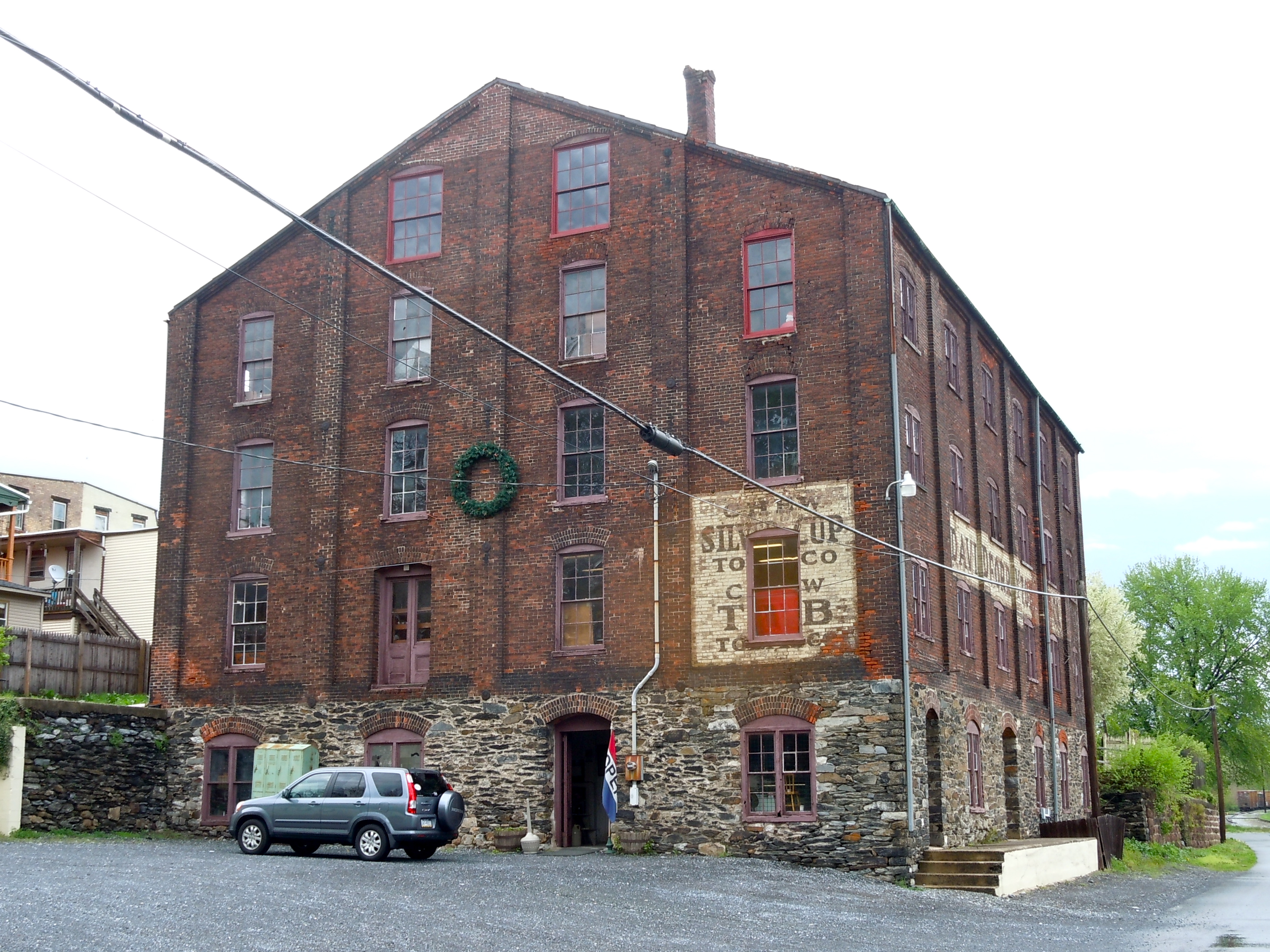
- Forry Warehouse, April 2011

- Location within Pennsylvania Location within the United States
- Location: 125 Bank Alley, Columbia, Pennsylvania
- Coordinates: 40°1′46″N 76°30′13″W
- Area: 0.3 acres (0.12 ha)
- Built: 1893–1895
- Built by: Geiske & Neimann
- NRHP reference No.: 79002252
- Added to NRHP: March 29, 1979

Bachman and Forry Tobacco Warehouse is a historic tobacco warehouse located at Columbia in Lancaster County, Pennsylvania. It was built between 1893 and 1895, and is a 3 1/2-story, rectangular brick building with a gable roof. It sits on a stone foundation and measures 54 feet by 85 feet.

It was listed on the National Register of Historic Places in 1979.
