= Jacob Gellert Frick =

American Civil War awardee (1825–1902)

Jacob Gellert Frick Sr.
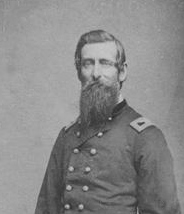
- Jacob G. Frick c. 1863
- Born: January 23, 1825; Northumberland County, Pennsylvania, U.S.
- Died: March 5, 1902 (aged 77); Pottsville, Pennsylvania, U.S.
- Burial place: Presbyterian Cemetery, Pottsville, Pennsylvania
- Military career
- Allegiance: United States
- Branch: United States Army (Union Army)
- Service years: 1846–1865
- Rank: Colonel
- Unit: 129th Pennsylvania Infantry
- Commands: 96th Pennsylvania Infantry (lieutenant colonel); 129th Pennsylvania Infantry (colonel); 27th Pennsylvania Emergency Militia (colonel)
- Conflicts: Mexican–American War; American Civil War: Seven Days Battles; Battle of Gaines's Mill; Battle of Glendale; Battle of Malvern Hill; Battle of Fredericksburg; Burnside's Mud March; Battle of Chancellorsville
- Awards: Medal of Honor

Jacob Gellert Frick Sr. (January 23, 1825 – March 5, 1902) was a United States infantry officer who fought with several Union Army regiments during the American Civil War, including as lieutenant colonel of the 96th Pennsylvania Infantry and as colonel of the 129th Pennsylvania Infantry. He received the United States' highest award for valor, the Medal of Honor, for his gallantry during the battles of Fredericksburg and Chancellorsville, Virginia. Grabbing the American flag from his regiment's color-bearer at Fredericksburg on December 13, 1862, he inspired his men to move forward "through a terrible fire of cannon and musketry"; at Chancellorsville, he personally engaged in hand-to-hand combat on May 3, 1863, to retrieve his regiment's flag which had been captured by the enemy. He was 67 years old when his Medal of Honor was conferred on June 7, 1892.

In praising Frick, Pennsylvania Governor Andrew Gregg Curtin said:

Col. Frick is every inch a soldier, a rigid disciplinarian, an efficient and worthy officer. His conduct on the battlefields at Fredericksburg and Chancellorsville was characterized by coolness and courage that plainly showed his capability to manage a large crowd.

== Formative years and early military service ==
Frick was born in Northumberland County, Pennsylvania, a fourth-generation descendant of Swiss immigrants. In June 1846, following the outbreak of the Mexican–American War, he was commissioned as a Third Lieutenant in the 3rd Ohio Infantry Regiment. When the war ended, he received a regular army commission in the 11th US Infantry Regiment. He served as an instructor at Fort McHenry, and was a delegate to the 1860 Republican National Convention.

Married to Pottsville native Catharine (Schuyler) Frick (1827–1864), he and his wife were the parents of: George Augustus (d. 1873), Sallie Schuyler (1856–1857), William Russell (1859–1939), and James Cameron (1860–1864).

== American Civil War ==
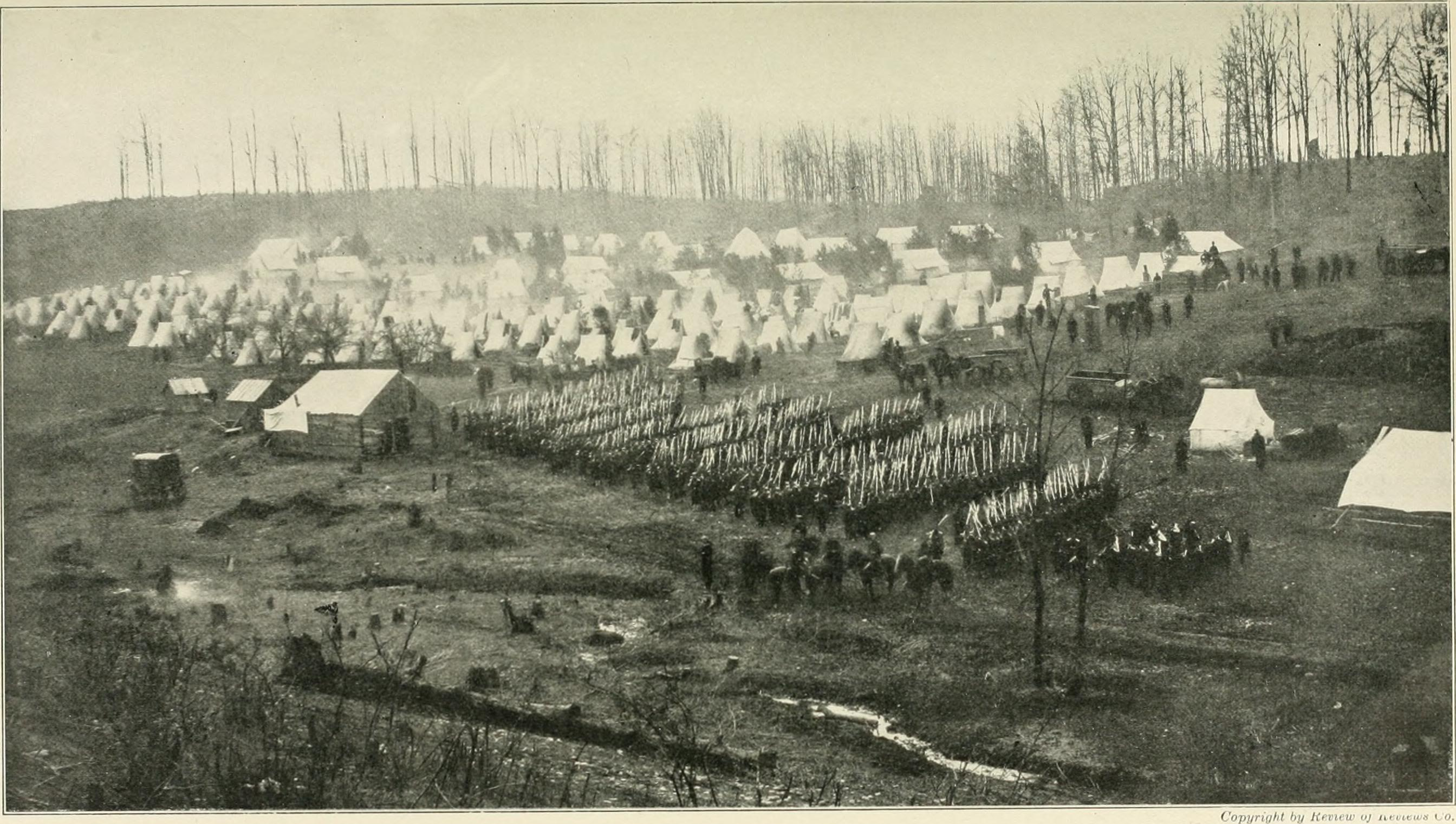
96th Pennsylvania Infantry at Camp Northumberland near Washington, D.C., February 1862.

Jacob G. Frick became one of the early responders to President Abraham Lincoln's call for volunteers to help preserve his nation's union following the April 1861 fall of Fort Sumter to Confederate States Army. On September 23 of that year, at the age of 36, he enrolled for Civil War military service in Pottsville, Pennsylvania, and officially mustered in there that same day with the field and staff officers' corps of the 96th Pennsylvania Infantry. Commissioned as a lieutenant colonel, he served as his regiment's second in command, and participated with his regiment in the Seven Days Battles from June 25—July 1, 1862, including the battles of Gaines's Mill (June 27), Glendale (June 30) and Malvern Hill (July 1).

On July 29, 1862, Frick was honorably discharged in order to assume command of a new regiment, the 129th Pennsylvania Infantry. Commissioned as a colonel, he re-enrolled and re-mustered for military service at Camp Curtin in Harrisburg, Pennsylvania on August 15. Transported with his men to Washington, D.C., he and his regiment then made camp near Alexandria, Virginia, on August 18. Assigned to guard duties there, two of his companies were then detached and assigned to build a bridge across Bull Run. The remainder of his men were then ordered to guard a Union ammunition train on August 30 near Centreville, where they came under brief, but heavy enemy artillery fire. Attached to the brigade commanded by Union General E. B. Tyler beginning September 3, he continued to drill his men at their encampments at Fairfax Seminary and Fort Richardson. He and his men experienced their first true exposure to combat in December during the Battle of Fredericksburg. According to historian Samuel Bates:

Shortly after noon of the 13th of December, the division crossed the Rappahannock, and proceeding through the town to a position in full view of the field, awaited the order to enter the fight. It was not long delayed ... advancing by a main road, the brigade halted in low, open ground, where the men were ordered to lie down....[T]he enemy opened a destructive fire from his batteries [wounding many Union soldiers].... Moving to the left of the road, the division was shortly after formed in line of battle on the crest of the hill, the brigade in two lines, the One Hundred and Twenty-ninth on the left front. In the hopeless and fruitless charge which followed, made under a ceaseless fire of musketry and artillery from the impregnable position which the enemy held, officers and men did everything that true soldiers could do, traversing in good order the lines of dead and wounded left in previous charges, and pressing forward in the gathering darkness until they attained position in advance of every previous charge, and from which it was impossible to go farther. In the brief space that it was in motion, the regiment lost one hundred and forty-two in killed and wounded. The caps of some were subsequently found close up to the famous stone-wall, and an officer and seven privates of company D were taken prisoners.

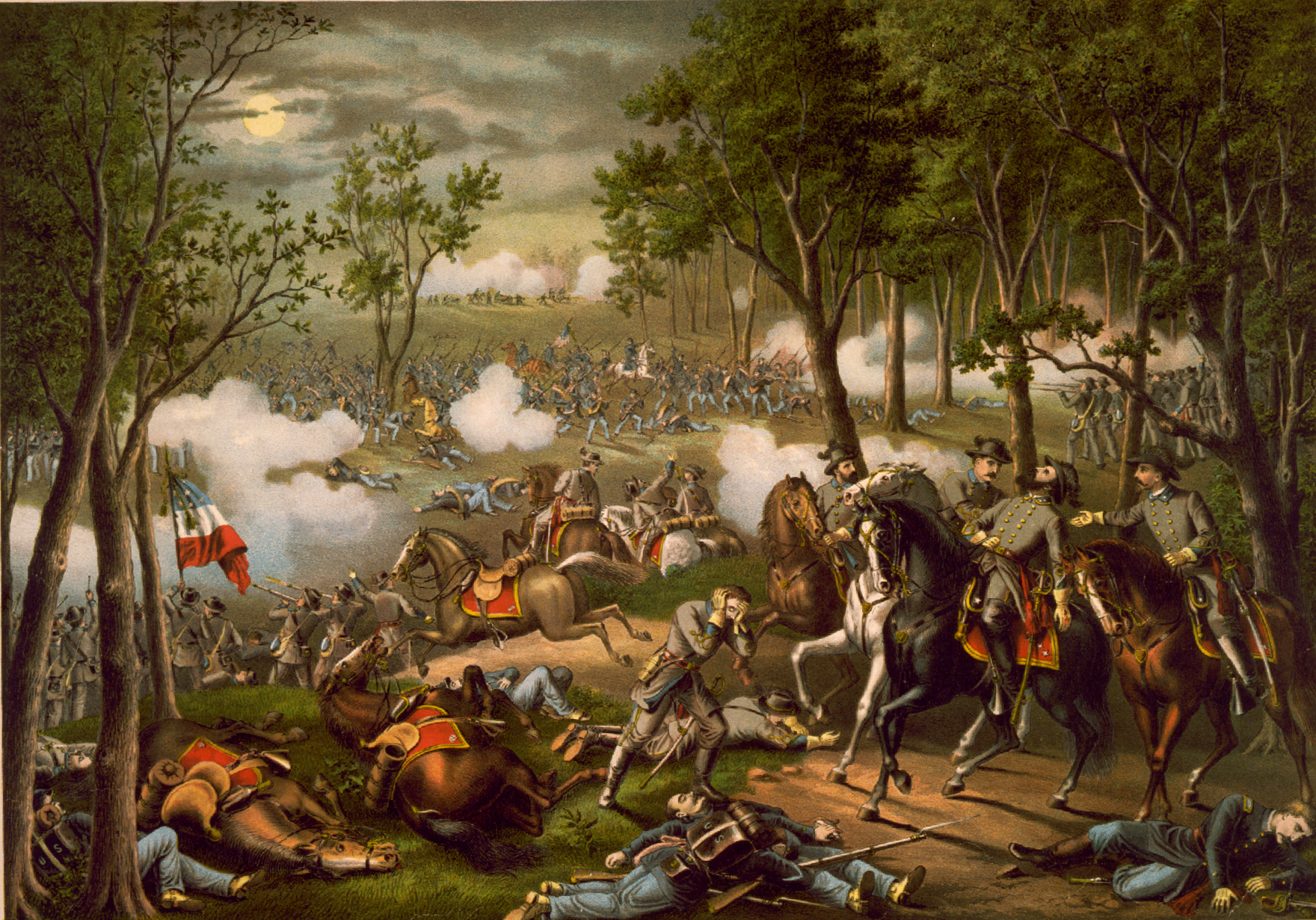
Battle of Chancellorsville, Virginia, May 1–3, 1863.

Afterward Frick and his fellow Union officers were praised by Tyler as having "discharged their respective duties creditably and satisfactorily, their voices being frequently heard above the din of battle, urging on their men against the terrible shower of shot and shell, and the terrific musketry, as we approached the stone wall." Frick's actions that day were later cited as evidence of his fitness for designation as a U.S. Medal of Honor recipient.

Assigned to guard and occupation duties within and outside of Frederick for the next several days, Frick and his men then participated in the "Mud March" under Major-General Ambrose Burnside (January 1863). Afterward, Frick was "Cashiered by sentence of Court Martial 1-25-63 & recommissioned by order of War Dept", according to his entry in the Civil War Veterans' Card File at the Pennsylvania State Archives.

Frick and his 129th Pennsylvanians then distinguished themselves in combat during the Battle of Chancellorsville (May 1–3, 1863), a fight in which the 129th Pennsylvania engaged again in intense hand-to-hand combat with the enemy. Afterwards, Tyler praised Frick's men, noting that "no man ever saw cooler work on field drill than was done by this regiment", and adding, "Their firing was grand, by rank, by company, and by wing, in perfect order." Five members of the regiment were dead, 32 were wounded, and five were missing. Frick and his men were then honorably mustered out on May 18, 1863, and returned home to Pennsylvania. As with Fredericksburg, Frick's conduct at Chancellorsville was later cited as a reason that he was a worthy candidate for the U.S. Medal of Honor. At Chancellorsville, he had personally engaged in hand-to-hand combat in order to retake the colors of his regiment after they had fallen into enemy hands.

After mustering out from the 96th Pennsylvania on May 18, 1863, Frick then re-enlisted with a third Pennsylvania unit. Re-enrolling at Camp Curtin in Harrisburg just over a month later on June 22, he was commissioned that same day as the colonel of the 27th Pennsylvania Militia (Emergency of 1863), one of multiple short-term units which were quickly raised during that summer to turn back Confederate General Robert E. Lee's army as it advanced into Pennsylvania. As the commanding officer of this regiment, Frick led the 27th Pennsylvania Emergency Militia during the Gettysburg campaign. Among his regiment's successes, his men burned the Columbia-Wrightsville Bridge to prevent its capture by the Confederate infantry led by Brig. Gen. John B. Gordon. Frick then mustered out with his regiment on July 31 when state leaders determined that the emergency had ended.

The fourth year of the war proved to be another challenging one for Frick with the majority of those challenges occurring on the home front. On February 16, 1864, his wife died in childbirth. Their son, John C. Frick, who was born that day, then survived just five months before he died at the family's Pottsville home on August 12. Another of the Fricks' children, James Cameron, then died four days after Christmas that same year. In the midst of this, he was called upon to advise Col. Henry Pleasants regarding the placement of mines under Confederate entrenchments during the 1864 Siege of Petersburg, a process which culminated in the Battle of the Crater.

== Post-war life ==
After the war, Frick returned to Pottsville, Pennsylvania, where, during the 1880s, he served as a deputy collector for the U.S. Internal Revenue Service. Remarried, he and his second wife, Priscilla H. (McGinnes) Frick (1840–1891), a native of New York who was a daughter of Enoch William McGinnes and Elizabeth (Patten) McGinnes, welcomed the births of children: Mason Mitchell (1869–1901), Annie (born July 1870), Jacob Jr. (born July 1872), and Thomas Percy (1874–1874), who was just two months old when he died.

Preceded in death by his wife in 1891, Jacob G. Frick, Sr. continued to reside in Pottsville with his civil engineer son, Mason, daughter Annie, and son, Jacob Jr., a coal office clerk. Frick, Sr. died in Pottsville on March 5, 1902. Following funeral services, he was buried in that city's Presbyterian Cemetery (also known as Bunker Hill Cemetery).

== Medal of Honor citation ==
Rank and organization: Colonel, 129th Pennsylvania Infantry
Place and date: At Fredericksburg, Virginia, December 13, 1862. At Chancellorsville, Va., May 3, 1863.
Entered service at: Pottsville, Pennsylvania
Born: January 23, 1838, Northumberland County, Pennsylvania
Date of issue: June 7, 1892.

Citation: The President of the United States of America, in the name of Congress, takes pleasure in presenting the Medal of Honor to Colonel (Infantry) Jacob G. Frick, United States Army, for extraordinary heroism on 13 December 1862, while serving with 129th Pennsylvania Infantry, in action at Fredericksburg, Virginia. Colonel Frick seized the colors and led the command through a terrible fire of cannon and musketry. In a hand-to-hand fight at Chancellorsville, Virginia, on 3 May 1863, he recaptured the colors of his regiment.

== Popular culture ==
Red-Tape and Pigeon-Hole Generals, was a fictional account of a soldier's life in the Army of the Potomac during the American Civil War. First published in 1864, it presented "a thinly disguised attack on the character and military ability of General Andrew A. Humphreys", according to Frederick B. Arner, who wrote the commentary for the book's 1999 re-release. The book has been "ascribed by some to Col. Jacob G. Frick", according to the compilers of the U.S. War Department's Bibliography of State Participation in the Civil War 1861–1866, which was published in 1913.

== See also ==
- List of Medal of Honor recipients
- List of American Civil War Medal of Honor recipients: A–F
- Pennsylvania in the American Civil War
