= East Prospect, Pennsylvania =

Borough in Pennsylvania, US

- Borough
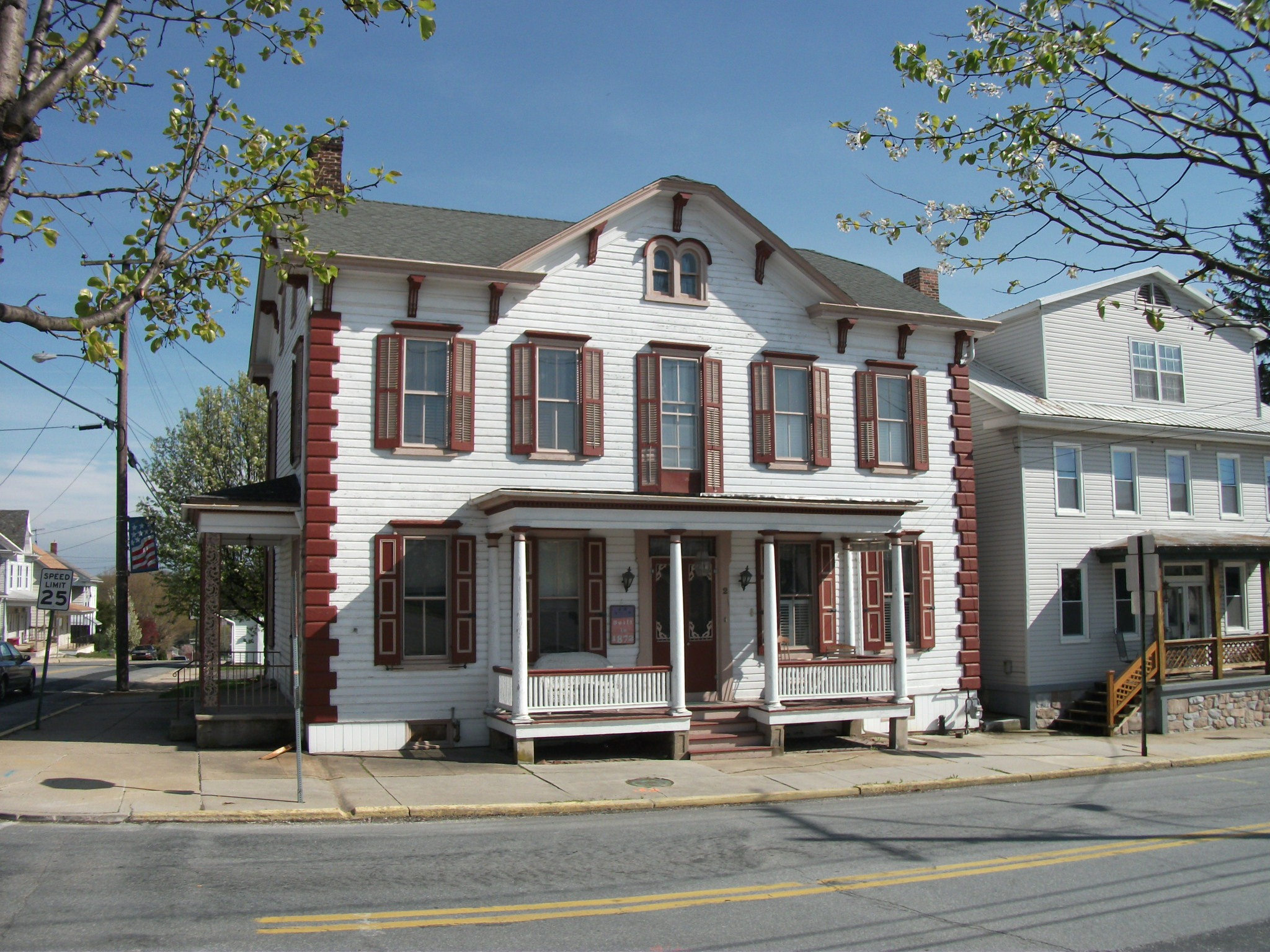

- Location in York County and the U.S. state of Pennsylvania.

- Location of East Prospect in Pennsylvania East Prospect (the United States)
- Coordinates: 39°58′17″N 76°31′14″W
- Country: United States
- State: Pennsylvania
- County: York
- Settled: 1849
- Incorporated: 1873

Government
  - Type: Borough Council
  - Mayor: David A. Bubb

Area
  - Total: 0.32 sq mi (0.83 km^{2})
  - Land: 0.32 sq mi (0.83 km^{2})
  - Water: 0 sq mi (0.00 km^{2})
- Elevation: 587 ft (179 m)

Population (2020)
  - Total: 929
  - Density: 2,922.2/sq mi (1,128.27/km^{2})
- Time zone: UTC-5 (Eastern (EST))
  - Summer (DST): UTC-4 (EDT)
- Zip code: 17317
- Area code: 717
- FIPS code: 42-21728
- Website: www.eastprospectborough.com

East Prospect is a borough in York County, Pennsylvania, United States. The population was 929 at the 2020 census. It is part of the York–Hanover metropolitan area.

== Geography ==
East Prospect is located at 39°58′17″N 76°31′14″W (39.971506, -76.520601) and is situated on the west bank of the Susquehanna River opposite Washington Boro. The head end of the Amerindian-named Conejohela Valley (extends to the Chesapeake) and commercially developed dam-created Lake Clarke region are centered mid-river between the towns, and on a line, more or less from the two county capitals, York and Lancaster, which are also approximately equidistant. The borough is surrounded by Lower Windsor Township and is just west of the Susquehanna River.

According to the United States Census Bureau, the borough has a total area of 0.3 square miles (0.78 km^{2}), all land.

== Demographics ==
Historical population
Census	Pop.	Note	%±
1880	250		—
1890	261		4.4%
1900	292		11.9%
1910	316		8.2%
1920	327		3.5%
1930	391		19.6%
1940	419		7.2%
1950	500		19.3%
1960	623		24.6%
1970	547		−12.2%
1980	529		−3.3%
1990	558		5.5%
2000	678		21.5%
2010	905		33.5%
2020	934		3.2%
2023 (est.)	927	▼	−0.7%

As of the census of 2000, there were 678 people, 258 households, and 198 families residing in the borough. The population density was 1,918.4 inhabitants per square mile (740.7/km^{2}). There were 272 housing units at an average density of 769.6 units per square mile (297.1 units/km^{2}). The racial makeup of the borough was 99.41% White, and 0.59% from two or more races. Hispanic or Latino of any race were 1.18% of the population.

There were 258 households, out of which 40.7% had children under the age of 18 living with them, 64.0% were married couples living together, 8.1% had a female householder with no husband present, and 22.9% were non-families. 18.2% of all households were made up of individuals, and 7.4% had someone living alone who was 65 years of age or older. The average household size was 2.63 and the average family size was 2.97.

In the borough the population was spread out, with 28.5% under the age of 18, 5.6% from 18 to 24, 35.4% from 25 to 44, 18.6% from 45 to 64, and 11.9% who were 65 years of age or older. The median age was 33 years. For every 100 females there were 103.6 males. For every 100 females age 18 and over, there were 100.4 males.

The median income for a household in the borough was $41,250, and the median income for a family was $48,051. Males had a median income of $32,734 versus $23,036 for females. The per capita income for the borough was $16,787. About 1.4% of families and 4.9% of the population were below the poverty line, including 2.6% of those under age 18 and 6.3% of those age 65 or over.

== Education ==
East Prospect is served by the Eastern York School District. Canadochly Elementary School is located in the borough.

== Expansion ==
In 2025, an expansion community in the center of East Prospect was announced to be under development with the Borough. Work began in 2026 for the addition of 42 more homes into East Prospect, the first subdivision of scale in more than two decades in East Prospect, it is expected to increase the total households within the borough by more than 15%.
