= John Wright (businessman) =

John Wright was an emigrant English pioneer, colonial period businessman who established Wright's Ferry (and eventually the town eponymously named for it). The resulting increase in settlement triggered nine years of armed conflict during the Maryland-Pennsylvania boundary dispute known as Cresap's War. The animal powered ferry was the very first means of crossing the broad unfriendly Susquehanna River in a region known as Conejohela Valley nearly halfway between what became Lancaster County, Pennsylvania, and York County, Pennsylvania.

Wright was a Quaker who first came to the area in 1724 to explore the land and preach to the local Native Americans.

In 1730, he was granted a patent to operate a ferry across the river and subsequently established the ferry with Robert Barber and Samuel Blunston. He also built a ferry house and a tavern on the eastern shore of the Susquehanna, north of Locust Street, on Front Street in Wright's Ferry, as the town was then known. The two-story log tavern, operated by John Wright, Jr. until 1834, consisted of a large room on either end connected by a passageway. When John Jr. married, he moved to York County’s western shore at Wright's Ferry West (later to be named Wrightsville), and built another ferry house and tavern. The ferry itself consisted of two dugout canoes fastened together with carriage and wagon wheels. When numerous cattle were moved, the canoeist guided a lead animal with a rope so that the others would follow. If the lead animal became confused and started swimming in circles, however, the other animals followed until they tired and eventually drowned.

== Extracts from Columbia, Pennsylvania ==
In 1724, John Wright, an English Quaker, traveled to the area (then a part of Chester County) to explore the land and proselytize to a Native American tribe, the Shawnee, who had established a settlement along a creek known as Shawnee Creek, which is still called that today. Wright built a log cabin near there on part of a tract of land first granted to George Beale by William Penn in 1699, and stayed for more than a year. The area was known as Shawanatown.

When Wright returned in 1726 with Robert Barber and Samuel Blunston, he and the others began developing the area, with Wright building a house about a hundred yards from the edge of the Susquehanna River, in the area of South Second and Union Streets. This structure eventually became home to the Wright family, including sons John Jr. and James. One of his daughters, the poet and businesswoman Susanna, born in England in 1697, arrived in the area in 1718, and later moved to the family residence to help take care of her brothers and sisters after her mother died.

Robert Barber constructed a saw mill in 1727 and years later built a home near the river, on the Washington Boro Pike, along what is now Route 441. The home still stands across from the Columbia Wastewater Treatment Plant and is the second oldest in the borough, after the Wright’s Ferry Mansion.

Samuel Blunston constructed a mansion, which he named Bellmont, atop the hill next to North Second Street, near Chestnut Street, at the location of the present-day Rotary Park Playground. Upon his death, Blunston willed the mansion to Susanna Wright, who had become a close friend. She lived there, occasionally visiting brother James, ministering to the Native Americans, and raising silkworms for the local silk industry, until her death in 1784 at the age of 87. The residence was demolished in the late 1920s to allow for construction of the Veterans’ Memorial Bridge.

In 1730, John Wright was granted a patent to operate a ferry across the Susquehanna River and subsequently established the ferry, known as Wright's Ferry, with Barber and Blunston. He also built a ferry house and a tavern on the eastern shore, north of Locust Street, on Front Street. The two-story log tavern, operated by John Wright, Jr. until 1834, consisted of a large room on either end connected by a passageway. When John Jr. married, he moved to York County’s western shore, in what became Wrightsville, and built a ferry house and tavern. The ferry itself consisted of two dugout canoes fastened together with carriage and wagon wheels. When numerous cattle were moved, the canoeist guided a lead animal with a rope so that the others would follow. If the lead animal became confused and started swimming in circles, however, the other animals followed until they tired and eventually drowned.

Traffic heading west from Lancaster, Philadelphia, and other nearby towns regularly traveled through Columbia, using the ferry to cross the Susquehanna. As traffic flow increased, the ferry grew, to the point of including canoes, rafts, flatboats, and steamboats, and was capable of handling Conestoga Wagons and other large vehicles. Due to the volume of traffic, however, wagons, freight, supplies and people often became backed up, creating a waiting period of several days to cross the river. With 150 to 200 vehicles lined up on the Columbia side, ferrymen used chalk to number the wagons. Typical fares were as follows:

- Coach with four passengers and drawn by five horses-9 shillings;
- 4-horse wagon - 3 shillings and 9 pence;
- Man and horse - 6 pence.

Fares were reduced in 1787 due to competition from Anderson's Ferry, located further upstream, near Marietta. Wright’s Ferry was located immediately south of the Veterans Memorial Bridge along Route 462. In later years, Wright rented the ferry to others and eventually sold it.

== Founding father ==
In 1729, after Wright had petitioned William Penn’s son to create a new county, the provincial government took land from Chester County to establish Lancaster County, the fourth county in Pennsylvania. County residents - Indians and colonists alike - regularly traveled to Wright’s home to file papers and claims, seek government assistance and redress of issues, and register land deeds. During this time, the town was called “Wright’s Ferry.”

In 1738, James Wright built the Wright’s Ferry Mansion, the oldest existing house in Columbia, for his family. The structure can still be seen at Second and Cherry Streets.

=== Columbia ===
Samuel Wright, son of James and Rhoda Wright, was born on May 12, 1754. He eventually became the town proprietor and created a public grounds company to administer the land. Through his trusteeship, the town’s first water distribution system (later The Columbia Water Company) was established and created, as well as “The Washington Institute,” the town’s first school of higher learning, and the Locust Street Park, located next to what is now Locust Street and Route 462.

In the spring of 1788 Samuel Wright had the area surveyed, and formally laid out the town into 160 building lots, which were chanced off by lottery at 15 shillings per ticket. "Adventurers" as purchasers were known, included speculators from many areas of the country. Wright and town citizens renamed the town “Columbia” in honor of Christopher Columbus in the hope of influencing the U.S. Congress to select it as the nation’s capital, a plan George Washington favored. A formal proposal to do so was made in 1789. Unfortunately for the town, when Congress voted in 1790, the final tally was one vote short. Later, Columbia narrowly missed becoming the capital of Pennsylvania. Harrisburg was chosen instead, since it is closer to the state’s geographical center. The third strikeout was despite its competitive location in regards to transportation, coal, and steel, resources, Columbia narrowly lost out to Detroit during the selection process for a center for the new automotive industry.

== See also ==
- Conejohela Flats
- Columbia, Pennsylvania
- Wrightsville, Pennsylvania
- Washington Boro, Pennsylvania
