= Conewago Falls =

Waterfall in Pennsylvania, United States

Coordinates: 40.120425°N 76.713568°W

Conewago Falls in Lancaster County, Pennsylvania, was a historic river barrier 12 miles (19 km) below and south of Harrisburg at a wide spot (8,000 feet (2,400 m)), where the river drops 19 feet (5.8 m) in 1/4 mile (0.40 km) along the lower Susquehanna River along either side of Three Mile Island. The falls between the west bank and the west side of the island were inundated-by-design years ago by construction of the York Haven Dam which, when it was completed in 1904, for a time became the third largest in the world. Today the Falls hides inside the Frederic Lake reservoir along the west side of the island.

The falls would often be portaged around by Native Americans with their elm bark canoes transiting between Susquehannock (and later, Iroquois and Lenape) Amerindian towns at points upriver to the oyster beds in Chesapeake Bay or vice versa. The Falls blocked riverine navigation on the Susquehanna River, and were one of the factors preventing barge or ship water transport from Baltimore and the Chesapeake Bay.

== See also ==
- List of dams and reservoirs of the Susquehanna River
- Wright's Ferry
