= Conejohela =

Conejohela may refer to:

- Conejohela Flats, a group of islands in Pennsylvania and Maryland
- Conejohela War, Cresap's War, a border conflict between Pennsylvania and Maryland, fought in the 1730s
