= Oldtown, Maryland =

- Census-designated place
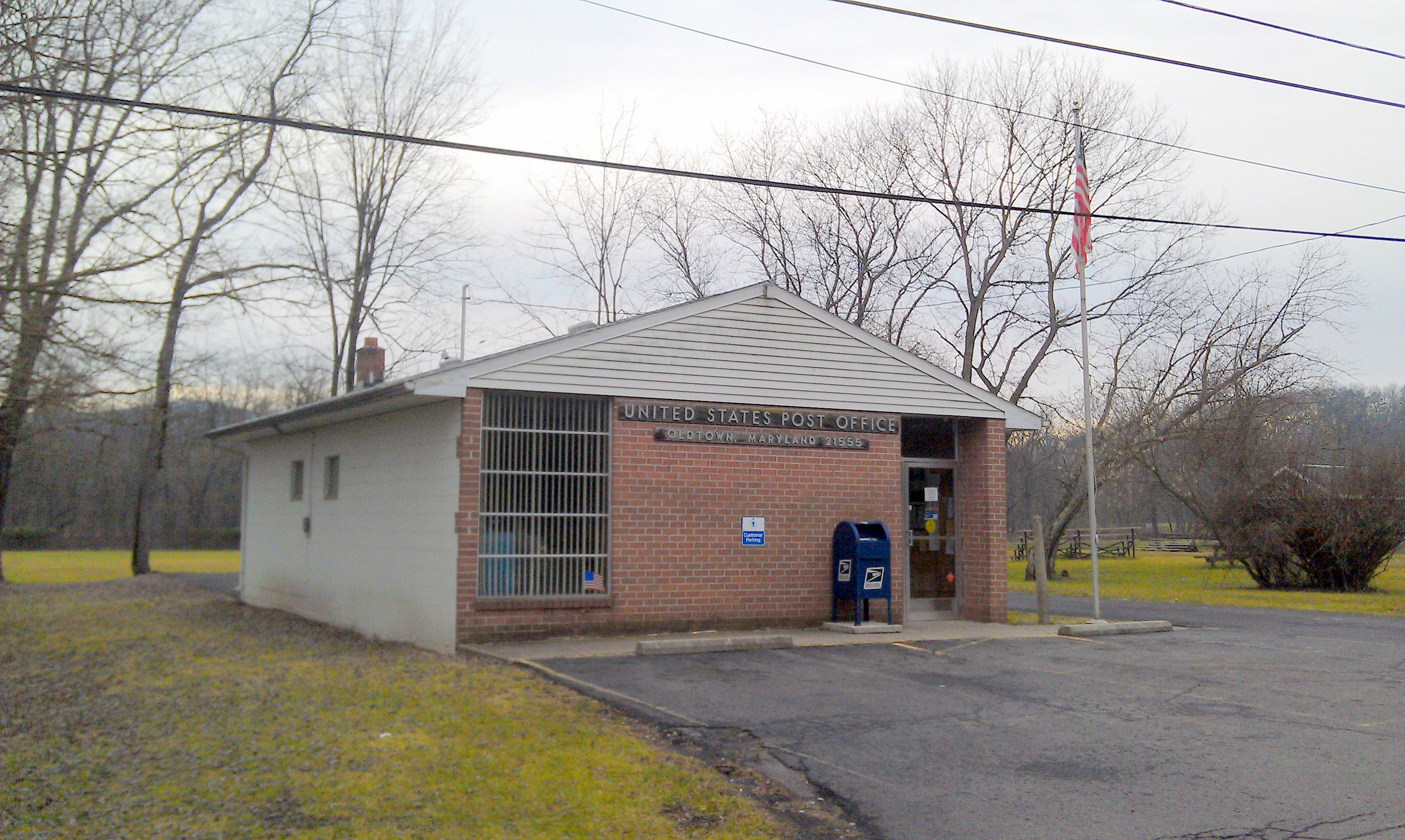
- U.S. Post Office, December 2011

- Location within the State of Maryland Oldtown (the United States)
- Coordinates: 39°32′45″N 78°36′42″W
- Country: United States
- State: Maryland
- County: Allegany

Area
  - Total: 0.37 sq mi (0.96 km^{2})
  - Land: 0.37 sq mi (0.96 km^{2})
  - Water: 0 sq mi (0.00 km^{2})
- Elevation: 646 ft (197 m)

Population (2020)
  - Total: 116
  - Density: 312.8/sq mi (120.76/km^{2})
- Time zone: UTC−5 (Eastern (EST))
  - Summer (DST): UTC−4 (EDT)
- ZIP code: 21555
- FIPS code: 24-58775
- GNIS feature ID: 2583668

Oldtown is an unincorporated community and census-designated place (CDP) in Allegany County, Maryland, United States, along the North Branch Potomac River. As of the 2010 census, it had a population of 68.

== History ==
It was founded in 18th century colonial times and was initially called "Opessa's Town" or "Shawanese Old Town" because it was the site of a Shawnee Amerindian village established by Opessa Straight Tail and abandoned about 1725. In later years the explanatory prefix was dropped from the name and the place because known simply as "Oldtown". Oldtown was begun (on a soon to be busy road) with the building of a trading post along an old Native American trail, the Nemacolin Trail, as traders, especially fur traders (and trappers) pushed through the Cumberland Narrows mountain pass into the Monongahela River valley.

In 1741 Thomas Cresap established a trading post at the abandoned village. A few years earlier, Cresap had figured prominently in the Conejohela War, (also called Cresap's War) concerning the Conejohela Flats area of the Susquehanna River valley, later York County, Pennsylvania. Shortly after his release from prison in Pennsylvania for advocating Maryland's claims, Cresap moved west to the sparsely settled frontier. Lord Baltimore claimed lands at the headwaters of the Potomac River. The move positioned Cresap and his patron to open the as yet uncharted Ohio Country. Cresap and the Delaware chief Nemacolin opened a road westward under the auspices of the Virginia and Maryland speculators of the Ohio Company once they received a charter.

Cresap's son Michael Cresap was born at Oldtown, the first white male born in Allegany County.

A post office was established there on May 26, 1870. Oldtown is connected by a one-lane low-water toll bridge to Green Spring, West Virginia.

The Chesapeake and Ohio Canal reached Cumberland, Maryland, from Georgetown (Washington, D.C.) in 1850, passing Oldtown at milepost 166.5. The Baltimore and Ohio Railroad, located just across the Potomac from Oldtown, had reached Cumberland eight years earlier. The canal finally closed operations as a carrier in 1924 due to flood damage. The B&O Railroad, now CSX, continues to be a major carrier, and it is used daily by Amtrak's Capitol Limited between Washington, DC and Chicago.

The Western Maryland Railway was extended west from Big Pool, Maryland, to Cumberland as a Class-I railroad in 1906, with the mainline being constructed through Oldtown complete with a train station located at the lower end of town. Passenger service ended on the Western Maryland Railway between Cumberland and Hagerstown on May 30, 1953. Afterwards it was not uncommon for B&O passenger trains to be rerouted over the Western Maryland through Oldtown. The last scheduled WM trains through Oldtown occurred on May 12, 1975, for freight, and May 21, 1975, for a Chessie System Passenger Special. The line was officially abandoned as part of the "Chessie System" consolidation, and all WM trains began running on the nearby B&O. A Chessie System work train pulled up the rails through Oldtown in June 1976.

In 1924 a six-classroom/auditorium brick school was erected along Main Street, with the first class graduating from there in 1925. In 1939 an identical new high school section was added to the south end of the present school, which increased the classroom total to fourteen. It included a new cafeteria, office and faculty room. During the 1954–55 school year yet another high school section was added, along with a new vocational agricultural shop, a furnace room and a brand new combination gym/auditorium which could seat 900 people. During the summer of 1977, the 1925 and 1939 sections were torn down, and a new present-day first floor section was constructed on the east side of where the old sections stood. In 2000 the 76th and final class graduated from Oldtown High School, and the school closed. Today it is privately owned, and a restaurant is now located in the former school cafeteria.

The Chesapeake and Ohio Canal National Historical Park was listed on the National Register of Historic Places in 1966. The Michael Cresap House was listed in 1972 and the Shawnee Old Fields Village Site in 1975.

== Demographics ==
Historical population
Census	Pop.	Note	%±
2020	116		—
U.S. Decennial Census
