= York Haven Dam =

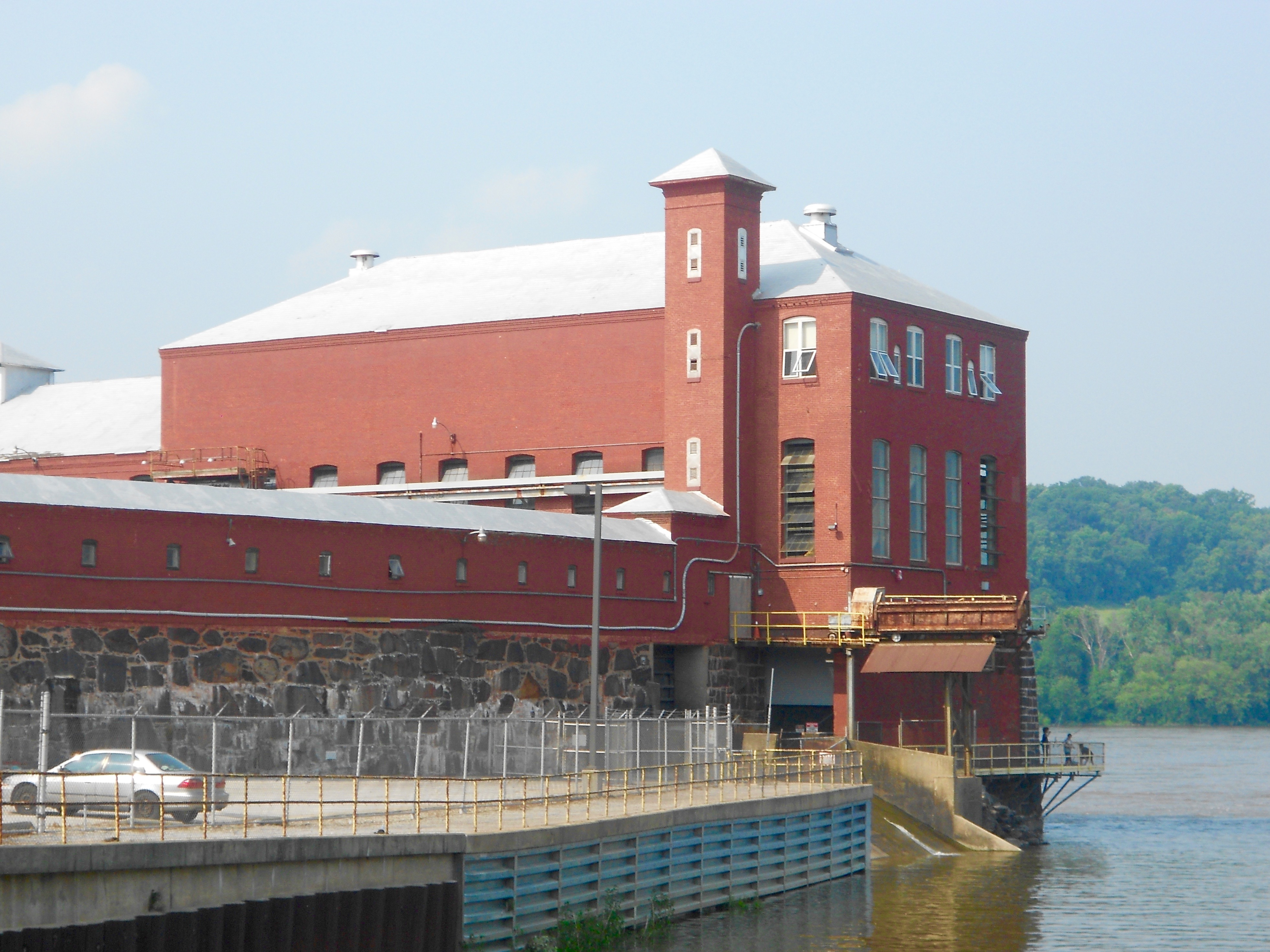
- York Haven Dam
- Interactive map of York Haven Dam
- Official name: York Haven Hydro Station
- Location: Dauphin / Lancaster / York counties, Pennsylvania, US
- Coordinates: 40°07′03″N 76°42′55″W
- Construction began: 1901
- Opening date: 1904
- Operator: York Haven Power Company

Dam and spillways
- Impounds: Susquehanna River
- Height: 18 feet (5.5 m)
- Length: 8,000 feet (2,400 m)

Reservoir
- Creates: Frederic Lake

The York Haven Dam is a low head, run-of-the river, dam and hydroelectric plant that is located on the Susquehanna River in the United States.

This dam is situated 12 miles (19 km) south of Harrisburg, Pennsylvania, at the Conewago Falls impounding about 8,000 feet (2,400 m) of the river to the west side of Three Mile Island, where the river drops 19 feet (5.8 m) in 1/4 mile (0.40 km). When the dam was completed in 1904, it was the third largest in the world.

== History and notable features ==
The major axis of the 5,000-foot (1,500 m) diversion dam is north to south and connects to a 3,000-foot (910 m) headrace which heads southeast. The dam and headrace are laid out along natural rock formations in the river. The south eastern end is situated on the "western" bank at York Haven. The north end lands at Three Mile Island. There is a smaller dam and fish passage further up the east side of Three Mile Island that completes the crossing to the eastern bank of the river.

The hydroelectric plant is located at the south eastern end, near the western bank of the river. Segments of the dam are situated in three municipalities in three separate counties: Londonderry Township, Dauphin County; Conoy Township, Lancaster County; and York Haven Borough, York County.

The hydroelectric plant generates 20–21 megawatts (27,000–28,000 hp) of power. The plant has thirteen horizontal generators that generate between 1000 and 1200 kW each. There are seven vertical generators that each generate between 1,200 and 1,600 kilowatts (1,600 and 2,100 hp). Six of the vertical units use S. Morgan Smith Kaplan turbines.

The plant uses one of the first Kaplan turbines installed in the United States, which is listed as a National Historic Mechanical Engineering Landmark.

The original turbines that powered the generators at the York Haven station were installed between 1903 and 1909 (two turbines per generator, forty turbines in all), and were made by the Poole Engineering & Machine Co. of Baltimore, Maryland. They were Francis-style turbines, based on the design of the inventor and hydraulic engineer, James Bicheno Francis (1815-1892). His design subsequently became the prototype for turbines for modern power plants. Of the original forty turbines installed by the Poole company, approximately half of them continue operating more than a century later. The York Haven station ranks among the half-dozen hydroelectric stations in the world that still depend on the same plant and much of the same machinery as when it began service, circa 1900.

The plant's FERC license runs through November 30, 2055.

The York Haven Hydro Project was formerly owned by Cube Hydro Partners, LLC, a portfolio company of I Squared Capital.

In 2019, Cube Hydro was purchased from I Squared Capital by Ontario Power Generation. OPG merged Cube Hydro with another company that it acquired in 2018, forming Eagle Creek Renewable Energy, which is the current operator of the York Haven Hydro Project.

== See also ==
- List of dams and reservoirs of the Susquehanna River
