= Washington Boro, Pennsylvania =

Unincorporated community in Pennsylvania, US

- CDP
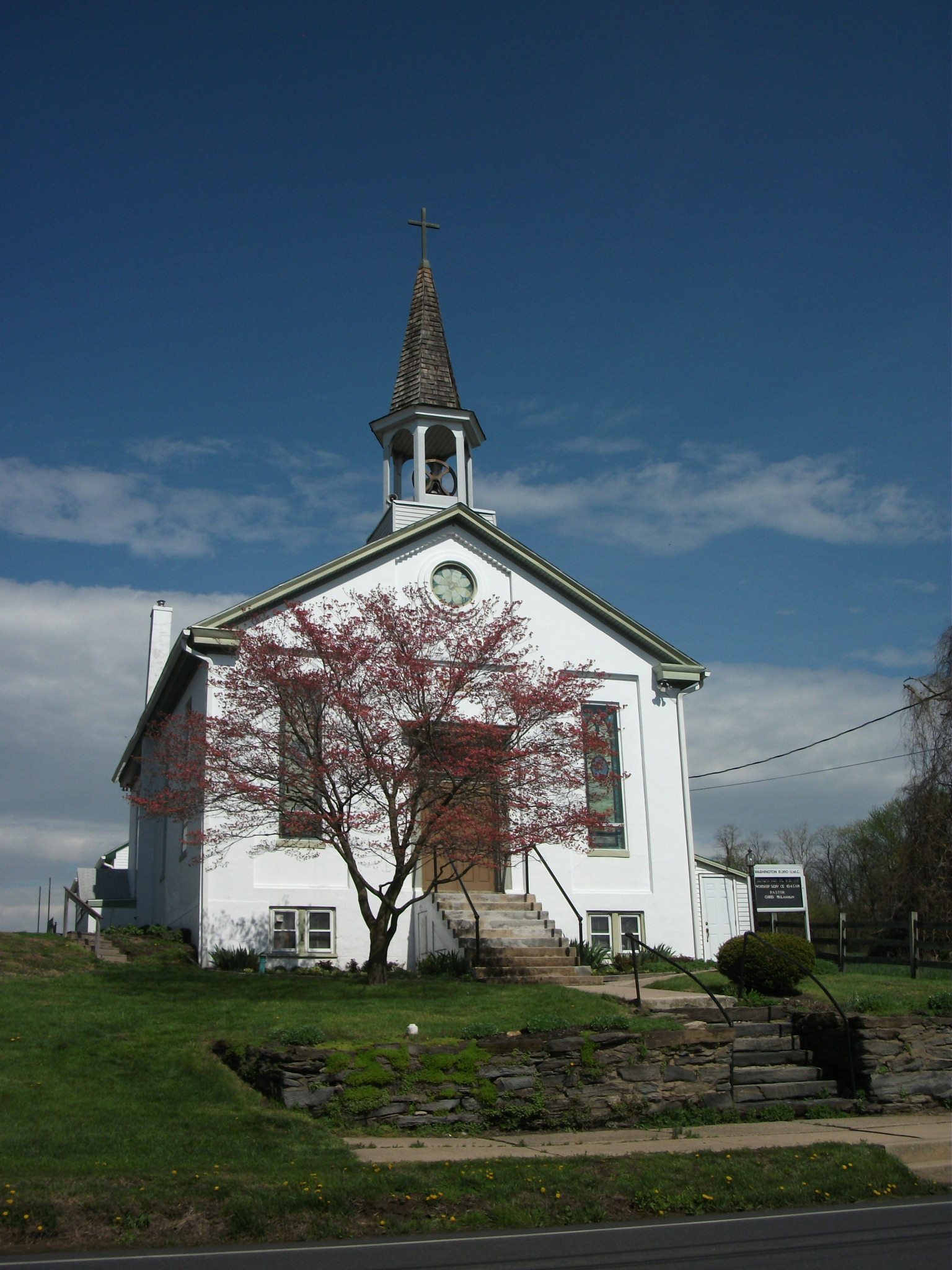
- Washington Boro Methodist Church

- Location in Pennsylvania Location in the United States
- Coordinates: 39°59′33″N 76°28′3″W
- Country: United States
- State: Pennsylvania
- County: Lancaster
- Township: Manor

Area
  - Total: 1.93 sq mi (5.00 km^{2})
  - Land: 1.93 sq mi (4.99 km^{2})
  - Water: 0 sq mi (0.0 km^{2})
- Elevation: 281 ft (86 m)

Population (2010)
  - Total: 729
  - Density: 378/sq mi (146.1/km^{2})
- Time zone: UTC-5 (Eastern (EST))
  - Summer (DST): UTC-4 (EDT)
- ZIP code: 17582
- Area code: 717
- FIPS code: 42-81360
- GNIS feature ID: 1193613

Washington Boro is a census-designated place (CDP) and former borough in Manor Township, Lancaster County, Pennsylvania, United States, along the Susquehanna River. The ZIP code is 17582. It is served by the Penn Manor School District and is the terminus of Pennsylvania Routes 441 and 999. The population was 729 at the 2010 census.

== History ==
The French-Canadian fur trader Martin Chartier and his son Peter Chartier established a trading post near this area in 1718. A monument was erected on the spot in 1925 by the Pennsylvania Historical Commission and the Lancaster County Historical Society.

Also called the "Borough of Washington" or "Washingtonboro" in the past, the small community was settled in 1810 and incorporated in 1827. It was a center of river trade and river jobs, as it is located near the site of the first colonial-era animal-powered ferry across the lower Susquehanna River—Wright's Ferry between present-day Columbia and Wrightsville. Due to the decline of river trade and jobs, the Borough of Washington was dissolved politically, effective December 31, 1973, becoming part of Manor Township.

== Geography ==
Washington Boro is located in western Lancaster County, in the northwestern corner of Manor Township. It is situated on the east bank of the Susquehanna River opposite Leibharts Corner in York County. The Susquehanna in this area is impounded by the Safe Harbor Dam 7 miles (11 km) to the southeast, forming Lake Clarke. Washington Boro is at the center of what was known in colonial times as the Conejohela Flats on the Susquehanna.

Pennsylvania Route 441 has its southern terminus in Washington Boro and leads north (upriver) 4 miles (6 km) to Columbia. PA 999 has its western terminus at PA 441 and leads northeast 10 miles (16 km) to Lancaster, the county seat.

According to the U.S. Census Bureau, the CDP has a total area of 1.9 square miles (5.0 km^{2}), of which 1.1 acres (4,592 m^{2}), or 0.09%, are water.

== Attractions ==
The village contains a number of old hotels used to attract travelers, which are now private homes. A volunteer fire department, Goodwill Fire Company No. 1, was organized in March 1917 and chartered September 8, 1918. It merged with three other neighboring fire companies to create Blue Rock Fire Rescue circa 2011. The former Patriotic Sons of America Lodge now serves as a community hall.

The Washington Boro Tomato Festival is held each year in July, and the Washington Boro United Methodist Church hosts its Tomato Feast in August.
