= Thomas Cresap =

English colonial settler in Maryland

- Born: c.1694 Skipton, Yorkshire, England
- Died: c.1790 Allegany County, Maryland, U.S.
- Partner(s): Hannah Johnson (1), Margaret Milburn (2)

Colonel Thomas Cresap (c.1694 – c.1790) was an English-born settler and trader in the states of Maryland and Pennsylvania. Cresap served Lord Baltimore as an agent in the Maryland–Pennsylvania boundary dispute that became known as Cresap's War. Later, together with the Native American chief Nemacolin, Cresap improved a Native American path to the Ohio Valley, and ultimately settled and became a large landowner near Cumberland, Maryland, where he was involved in further disputes near Brownsville, Pennsylvania, including in the French and Indian War and Lord Dunmore's War.

== Early life ==
Cresap was born in Skipton, Yorkshire, England, and emigrated across the Atlantic Ocean to the Maryland colony when he was 15 years old. In 1723, he gave his occupation as that of a carpenter. He initially settled at the mouth of the Susquehanna River on the Chesapeake, on the lower end of a floodplain called the Conejohela Valley, and built boats. In 1725, Cresap married Hannah Johnson, whose father, Thomas Johnson, on 24 March 1725 had surveyed to himself Mount Johnson Island, at Peach Bottom Ferry.

== Agent for Lord Baltimore in the Susquehanna Valley ==
Cresap also traveled at least once to Virginia, for Virginia-based trader Claiborne also traded for furs in the lower Susquehanna area of Chesapeake Bay. Cresap fled from Virginia either because of the Native American raids against white settlers in 1722, or because a dozen or more fellow settlers drove him as he cleared timber to make a dwelling and secure his land claim. As Cresap defended himself, he cleft one of his assailants with a broad-ax.

Upon returning to Maryland, Cresap secured a patent to operate a ferry over the Susquehanna at the head of tide-water from Lord Baltimore. Although Captain John Smith had traveled up the Chesapeake, possibly this far, in 1608, Virginians had ceded this area to Maryland, but Pennsylvania also claimed the area as covered by land grants to William Penn. Cresap had little formal education, but became a land surveyor, and was of great service to Lord Baltimore in extending the western boundary of Maryland from the source of the south branch of the Potomac due north, thus adding at least one third more territory to Maryland.

Cresap came to Conejohela Valley in March 1730, and built a block-house on the banks of the river three and one half miles below today's Wrightsville, near the site of Leber's Mill. That same year, he took out a Maryland patent for several 100 acres (400,000 m^{2}) near the river for "Blue Rock Ferry" at same place. In 1731, Cresap was commissioned a justice of the peace for Baltimore County. While Cresap lived in the lower Susquehanna area, he visited the rich valleys 30 miles (48 km) farther up the right bank of the river, now in Hellam and Lower Windsor Townships. He reported the conditions to Lord Baltimore, who as early as 1721 had contemplated extending the northern boundary of Maryland on the west side of the Susquehanna to the northern limits of the fortieth degree of latitude. (See Maryland–Pennsylvania boundary dispute)

Gradually a few settlers from Maryland moved to the Conojohela Valley. They were aggressive to the Pennsylvanians who settled near them. It was not Lord Baltimore's practice to purchase lands from the Indians; instead the Marylanders drove them away by force. The settlers treated the Indians on the west side of the river with cruelty. However, they had no one capable of holding the ground they had taken either from the Indians nor from the Pennsylvanians, who were determined to prevent Baltimore from gaining a foothold on this disputed area.

Cresap became a notorious figure in the Conejohela Flats area—the lower Susquehanna Valley in the area south of Wright's Ferry—where his actions (and those of his men) as an agent on behalf of Lord Baltimore made him a wanted criminal in Pennsylvania. Cresap and his men several times used force to evict men who had considered themselves legal under Pennsylvania's Colonial Charter, but whom Cresap and Lord Baltimore considered squatters interfering with Maryland's charter. Because of the bloodshed during Cresap's War, King George II issued an edict forcing a settlement of the Maryland-Pennsylvania boundary dispute against the claims by Lord Baltimore. Cresap was held a villain in Pennsylvania, and something of a hero in Maryland, which has municipalities named after him. In 1735, he took out a Maryland patent for a group of islands at Blue Rock Ferry, called the "Isles of Promise." After many attempts to capture Cresap, Pennsylvania Sheriff Samuel Smith and 24 armed men finally captured him on 25 November 1736, as his wife stood by him and fought at his side.

By this time the Cresaps had at least two and perhaps three children, the eldest being about 9 years of age. While Pennsylvanians imprisoned Cresap, his wife and children lived with his cousin Daniel Lowe, who drove one of the German settlers from his home in Grist Valley (Kreutz Creek), near Codorus.

== Potomac Valley trader, explorer and agent for the Ohio Company ==
Upon his release circa 1738, Cresap again moved beyond the frontier, this time along the Potomac River watershed. He patented about 2,000 acres (8.1 km^{2}) of land in Maryland along Antietam Creek, where Cresap established a store and Indian trading post. He accumulated a large quantity of furs and pelts and shipped them to England. However, French privateers captured the vessel and Cresap lost everything. In 1739, he was granted 400 acres (1.6 km^{2}) which he named Long Meadows. Cresap is said to have erected a stone and log fort over a spring near the Marsh Run.

Cresap then moved farther west to within two miles (3 km) of present-day Cumberland, Maryland, where he again embarked in the Indian trade. This area, the Cumberland Narrows mountain pass led into the Monongahela River valley. During the 1740s, colonials were petitioning the crown to obtain lands of the so-called Ohio Country across the Allegheny Mountains from the Indians. The Cumberland narrows is one of only five navigable routes over the Appalachian Mountains barrier range. Cresap founded what is now Oldtown, Maryland by building a trading post at the foot of the Amerindian trail over Wills Mountain (renamed Haystack now near Cresaptown). The colonials wanted the crown to open these possessions for settlement, and give them out under charter in the same old way, through the crown's minister. Cresap also sent traders over the pass and explored personally in Amerindian lands along the Monongahela upriver of Redstone Old Forts. Although Maryland's land grant ended at the crest of the Appalachian mountains, both Pennsylvania and Virginia claimed their land grants continued westward, so the land claimed by Cresap and his traders west of the Appalachians ultimately became part of upper West Virginia and western Pennsylvania.

Circa 1744, some Amerindians claimed to sell their rights east of the Appalachians to Virginia land speculators, including a stock company, the Ohio Company which received a charter to 2 million acres (8,100 km^{2}) in Western Pennsylvania, Ohio and West Virginia around 1748. Cresap received or earned a large land grant from the Ohio Country in what much later became West Virginia. In 1748–1750, an expedition led by Cresap and the Delaware Amerindian Chief Nemacolin began widening the Nemacolin Trail into freight wagon road from Cumberland to Redstone Old Fort. A decade later, George Washington and his troops would further improve the same road prior to Braddock's Military Expedition during the French and Indian War. Redstone, on the Monongahela River became Brownsville, Pennsylvania which dwarfed Pittsburgh in growth and vibrant industrial activities until circa 1840-50s, as a center for construction and outfitting various river craft (keel boats, flat boats, steamboats) settlers used to settle not only the entire Mississippi drainage basin, but the far west and Oregon Country beyond the source waters of the Missouri River.

== French and Indian War ==
Cresap fought a number of skirmishes with the Indians and stood his ground, assisted by his wife and later his sons. When Cresap's stronghold was surrounded by militia from Donegal Hannah knew how to handle a musket. She also superintended the construction of a house and the building of some flatboats, in the absence of her husband, at John Hendricks', now the upper end of Wrightsville, where forcible possession had been taken of Hendricks' plantation by Cresap. While there she saw a flatboat filled with armed men crossing the river. She mounted her horse, sounded a bugle, and rode rapidly to Cresap's fort, three miles (5 km) and a half down the river. She returned at the head of the militia. Cresap was elected a representative from Frederick County, Maryland to the Maryland legislature. When the French and their allies attempted to seize the territory west of the Allegheny Mountains from the English, Cresap and his sons at their own expense raised two companies of volunteer soldiers. During the French and Indian War, Cresap raised a company of Rangers.

== Later years ==
Cresap was a large landholder. He became totally blind a few years before his death. He married a second time, to Margaret Milburn, when he was 80 years of age. He died c. 1790 at his home in Allegany County, Maryland, aged 88.

== Descendants ==
Thomas and Hannah (Johnson) Cresap had five children: three sons and two daughters.

The oldest son, Daniel Cresap, remained in Washington County, Maryland, and became a large landholder and a celebrated hunter as well as a farmer. He was about fourteen when the family left York County. As an adult, he was colonel of militia. By his first wife he had a son, Michael. By a second wife he had seven sons and three daughters: Daniel, Joseph, Van, Robert, James, Thomas, Elizabeth, Mary and Sarah. Daniel marched in his uncle Michael's company to Boston in 1775. James was for a number of years in the Maryland legislature.

Thomas, the second son of Col. Cresap, was killed by a Native – whom he killed at the same instant. He left a widow and one child.

Michael, was born in Frederick County, Maryland, 29 June 1742. He succeeded his father in the Indian trade. Michael Cresap operated a large trading store at "Old Town," a few miles east of Cumberland. He was an Indian fighter from his youth. In 1774 he employed several men and descended the Ohio River and was engaged in the business of erecting houses and clearing lands for the settlers. While thus engaged he received a letter from Dr. Connolly, the commandant at Fort Pitt, that there was danger of an Indian war. The settlers were alarmed. Michael and his party, anticipating an attack by the Indians, struck them first. Some of his men killed several Indians near Wheeling. Another group of frontiersmen, led by Daniel Greathouse, shortly afterwards killed the family of the celebrated Indian Logan and several others. Cresap was mistakenly accused of leading this action as well. Logan reacted swiftly, striking settlers on the frontier. This was followed by "Lord Dunmore's War" and the Battle of Point Pleasant along the Ohio River, which brought about a treaty of peace.

Michael Cresap was held in esteem by his neighbors. He was the first person in Maryland to raise a company of volunteer riflemen. He marched at their head to Boston in 1775, where he fought with great bravery. He took sick (tuberculosis is suspected) and was compelled to return to New York, where he died. He lies in Trinity Church Cemetery. Michael Cresap left five children, two sons and three daughters.

== See also ==
- Cresaptown, Maryland
- Dan's Mountain
- Negro Mountain

== Notes ==
- History of York County, Pennsylvania. John Gibson, historical editor. Chicago: F. A. Battey Publishing Co., 1886 (Copyright Expired), Page 602–604.
- Pennsylvania Archives Series 1 Vol 1, By Samuel Hazard, William Henry Egle, Pennsylvania Dept. of Public Instruction, 1852, Pages 311–313, 352–367, 412–421, 462–468, 476, 487, 489–494, 501, 504–535
- Mary Beam Pinkerton. 1932. On the Trail of Thomas Cresap: A Trip to Yorkshire, England. The Cresap Society.
- Kenneth P. Bailey. 1944. Thomas Cresap, Maryland Frontiersman. Christopher Publishing House, Boston.
- Papers of the Cresap/Bruce Family. Special Collections, University of Maryland Libraries.
