= Wrightsville Dam =

Coordinates: 40.0176°N 76.5167°W

Wrightsville dam
- Official name: Wrightsville Dam
- Location: Lancaster / York counties, Pennsylvania, USA
- Construction began: 1840
- Opening date: 1840
- Operator: defunct

Dam and spillways
- Impounds: Susquehanna River
- Height: 10 feet
- Length: ~5,000 feet

The Wrightsville Dam was a 19th-century dam on the lower Susquehanna River between Wrightsville and Columbia, Pennsylvania.

The low-head dam was constructed in 1840 to impound the waters of the Susquehanna to provide a slackwater pool to allow the safe passage of canal boats from the Pennsylvania Canal on the Columbia (Lancaster County) side across the mile-wide rocky river to the Susquehanna and Tidewater Canal on the Wrightsville (York County) side.

== See also ==
- List of dams and reservoirs of the Susquehanna River
