= Safe Harbor Dam =

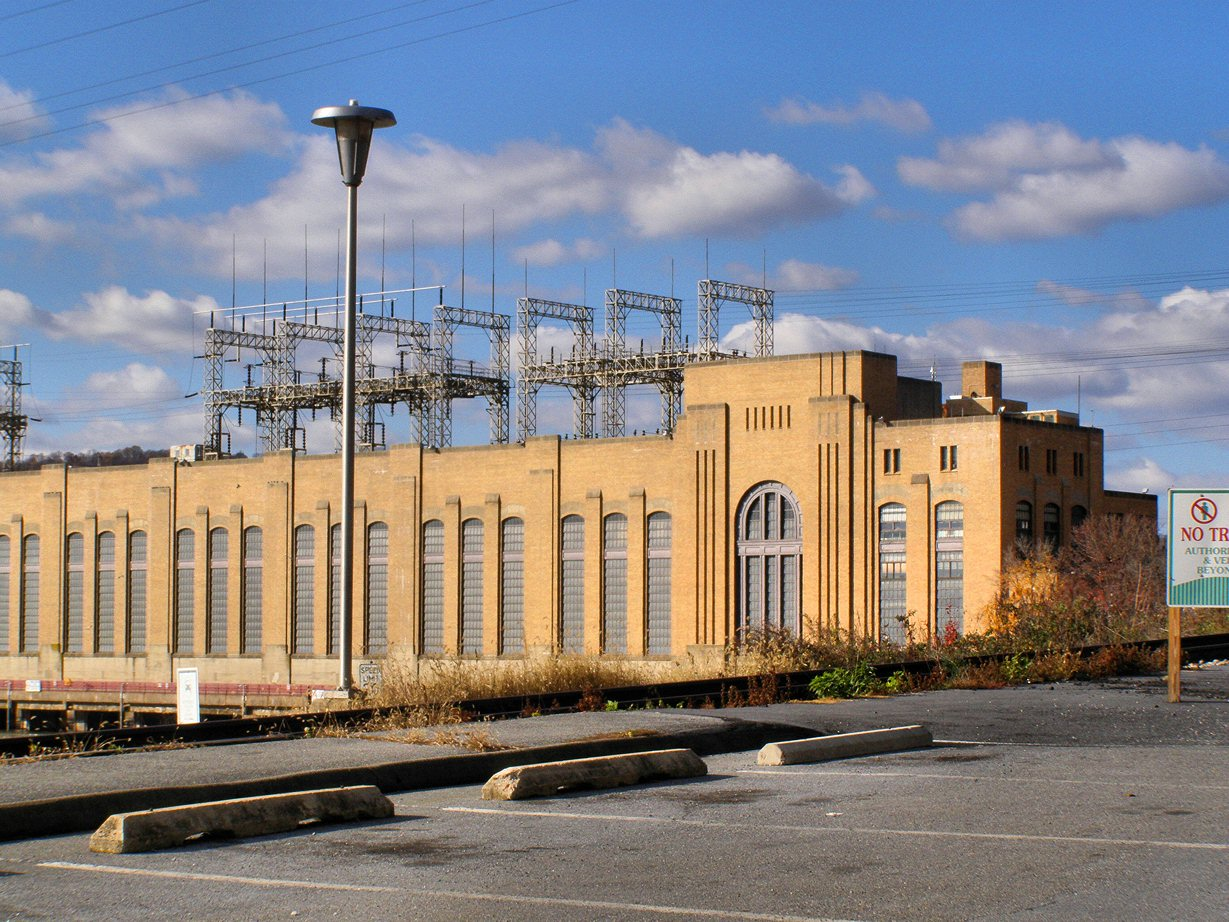
- The east end of the turbine hall for the Safe Harbor Dam housing the 25 Hz turbines.
- Interactive map of Safe Harbor Dam
- Official name: Safe Harbor Hydroelectric Station
- Location: Manor Township, Lancaster County / Chanceford Township, York County, Pennsylvania, USA
- Coordinates: 39°55′14″N 76°23′33″W
- Construction began: April 1, 1930
- Opening date: December 7, 1931
- Operator: Brookfield Renewable Partners

Dam and spillways
- Type of dam: Gravity
- Impounds: Susquehanna River
- Height: 75 ft (23 m)
- Length: 4,869 ft (1,484 m)
- Spillway type: Service, controlled
- Spillway capacity: 1,120,000 cu ft/s (31,715 m^{3}/s)

Reservoir
- Creates: Lake Clarke

Power Station
- Turbines: 7 × 33.0 MW; 5 × 37.5 MW; 2 × 2 MW
- Installed capacity: 422.5 MW

The Safe Harbor Dam (also Safe Harbor Hydroelectric Station) is a concrete gravity dam, with an associated hydroelectric power station, on the lower Susquehanna River. It is the most northerly and last of three Great Depression-era public electrification projects' hydroelectric dams, and was constructed between April 1, 1930, and December 7, 1931. It created a long and relatively shallow lake, known as Lake Clarke, along the upper stretch of the Conejohela Valley. The creation of the lake shrank the upper Conejohela Flats in size.

Two of the turbine units are dedicated to generating electricity for Amtrak's 25 Hz traction power system, and the facility also has a frequency converter available for conversion of power between 25 Hz and the 60 Hz used by the electric grid.

== Base terrains ==
The mixed marshy terrain of the Conejohela Valley contained rapids and small waterfalls, wetlands, and thick woods along both sides of the river within a ten-year floodplain which saw annual inundations all the way down into Maryland at the headwaters of Chesapeake Bay, and experienced catastrophic floods regularly (the meaning of a ten-year floodplain). The varied terrain created many interface zones biologically nurturing a great many species. Many of those habitats effectively created difficult walking and horseback terrains, which stifled east-west crossing of the lower Susquehanna in colonial Pennsylvania-Maryland, spurring the 1730 opening of the historic Wright's Ferry and (later the first two) Columbia-Wrightsville Bridges, once believed to be the longest covered bridges in the world.

== Siting ==
The dam is located just above the confluence of the Conestoga River with the Susquehanna, about 7 miles (11 km) downstream of Washington Boro, Pennsylvania, which at mid-river is figured more or less the center of Lake Clarke created by the dam – which has become very popular for water sports and fishing. Ecologically, the varying depth of inundated islands on the bottom of the lake create a succession of valuable varied habitats that support numerous freshwater feeder fish, pan fish, and large predatory game fish species. Thus, the bird-small animal habitat that was lost was replaced, by and large, by freshwater lacustrine habitats.

== Operating company ==
LS Power Group purchased PPL's share in 2011, and was subsequently purchased in March 2014 by Brookfield Renewable Inc. In May 2014, Brookfield purchased Exelon's share, gaining full ownership. The Safe Harbor Water Power Corporation operates the dam and power plant.

== Planning and construction ==
Planning for the construction of the Safe Harbor Dam started in 1929, and construction started on April 1, 1930. The dam was completed and closed its gates for the first time on September 29, 1931. The first power was generated on December 7, 1931, and the last of the original seven turbine generator units came on-line on October 14, 1940. Planning for expansion of the generation capacity started in 1981. Construction started on April 12, 1982, and the five new turbine generator units came on-line between April 13, 1985 and April 12, 1986.

Units 1 and 2 are Kaplan turbines which are connected to single-phase generators to feed Amtrak's 25 Hz traction power system. Typically, two thirds of the 25 Hz power output is dispatched to Amtrak's substation in Perryville, Maryland via four circuits. The remaining third of output is transmitted by two circuits to substations in Royalton and Parkesburg, Pennsylvania. The facility also has a motor-generator frequency converter which can convert any excess 25 Hz power to 60 Hz or can convert 60 Hz power to 25 Hz when needed.

The remaining twelve units generate 60 Hz, three-phase power. Safe Harbor can generate 417.5 megawatts of hydroelectric power. Power from Safe Harbor is dispatched through the PJM Interconnection, one of many regional transmission organizations feeding the nations power grids.

== Key events ==
On May 18, 2001, President George W. Bush visited the Safe Harbor Hydroelectric plant to expound on his just-unveiled National Energy Policy. Safe Harbor was chosen as an example of government, corporate, and environmental groups working together in energy generation.

In 2001, Safe Harbor Water Power Corporation won the Governor's Award for Environmental Excellence. The award citation states that Safe Harbor had removed over 11,000 tons of debris from the river and was able to recycle almost all of it.

== See also ==
- Conowingo Dam
- List of dams and reservoirs of the Susquehanna River
- Wanamaker, Kempton and Southern 65, a steam locomotive built in 1930 for the construction of this dam, now preserved on a tourist railroad.
