= Long Meadows =

Historic house in Maryland, United States

- U.S. National Register of Historic Places
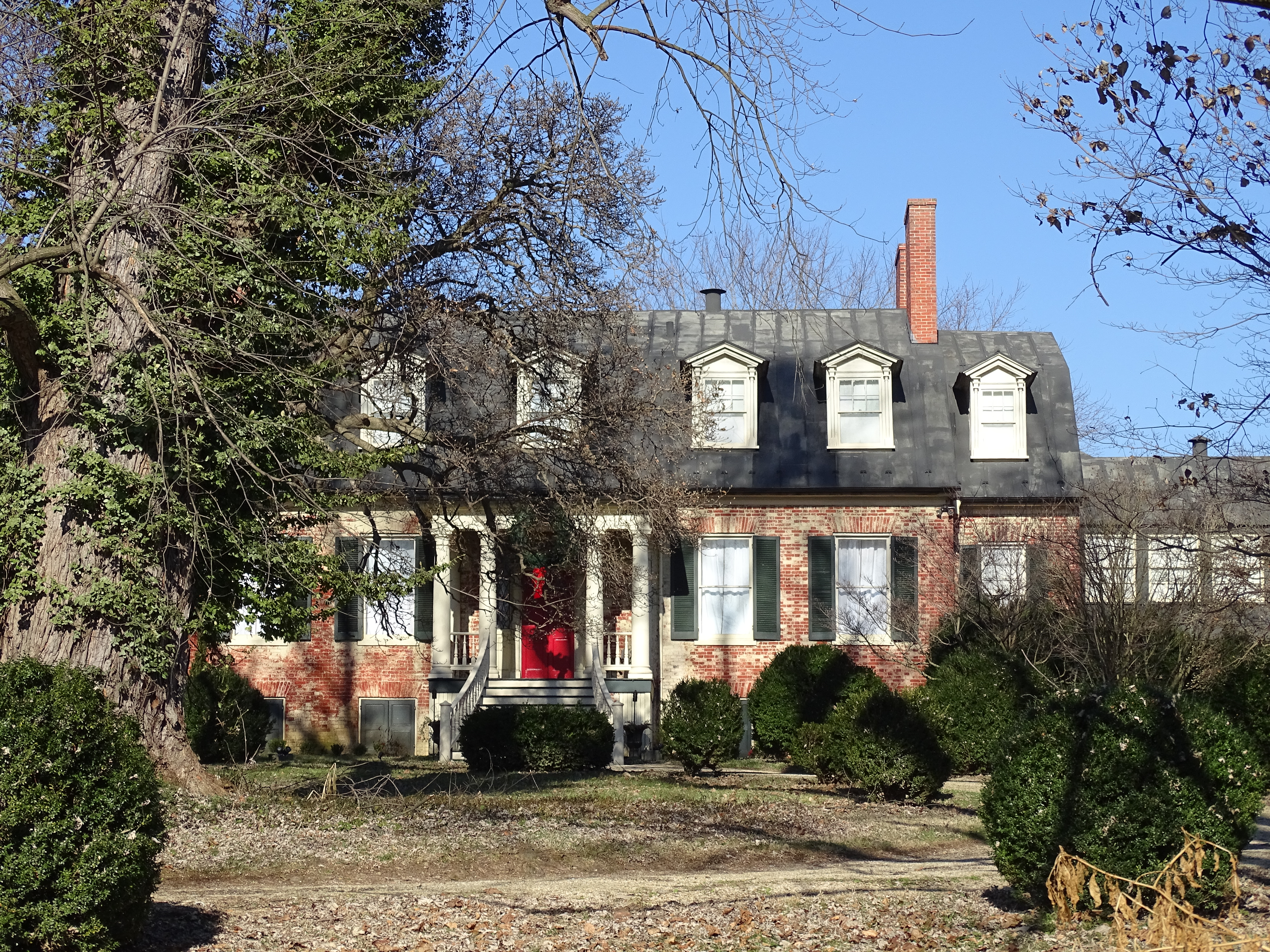

- Location within Maryland Location within the United States
- Location: North of Hagerstown on Marsh Pike, Hagerstown, Maryland
- Coordinates: 39°41′41″N 77°41′8″W
- Area: 4.1 acres (1.7 ha)
- Built: 1908
- Built by: Yessler, Harry E.
- NRHP reference No.: 78001480
- Added to NRHP: September 1, 1978

Long Meadows is a historic home located near Hagerstown, Washington County, Maryland, United States. In 1739, Thomas Cresap was granted 400 acres (1.6 km^{2}) which he named Long Meadows, where he is said to have erected a stone and log fort over a spring near the Marsh Run. Stones from the fort are said to have been used in the construction of the barn wall located on the property.

Long Meadows was listed on the National Register of Historic Places in 1978.

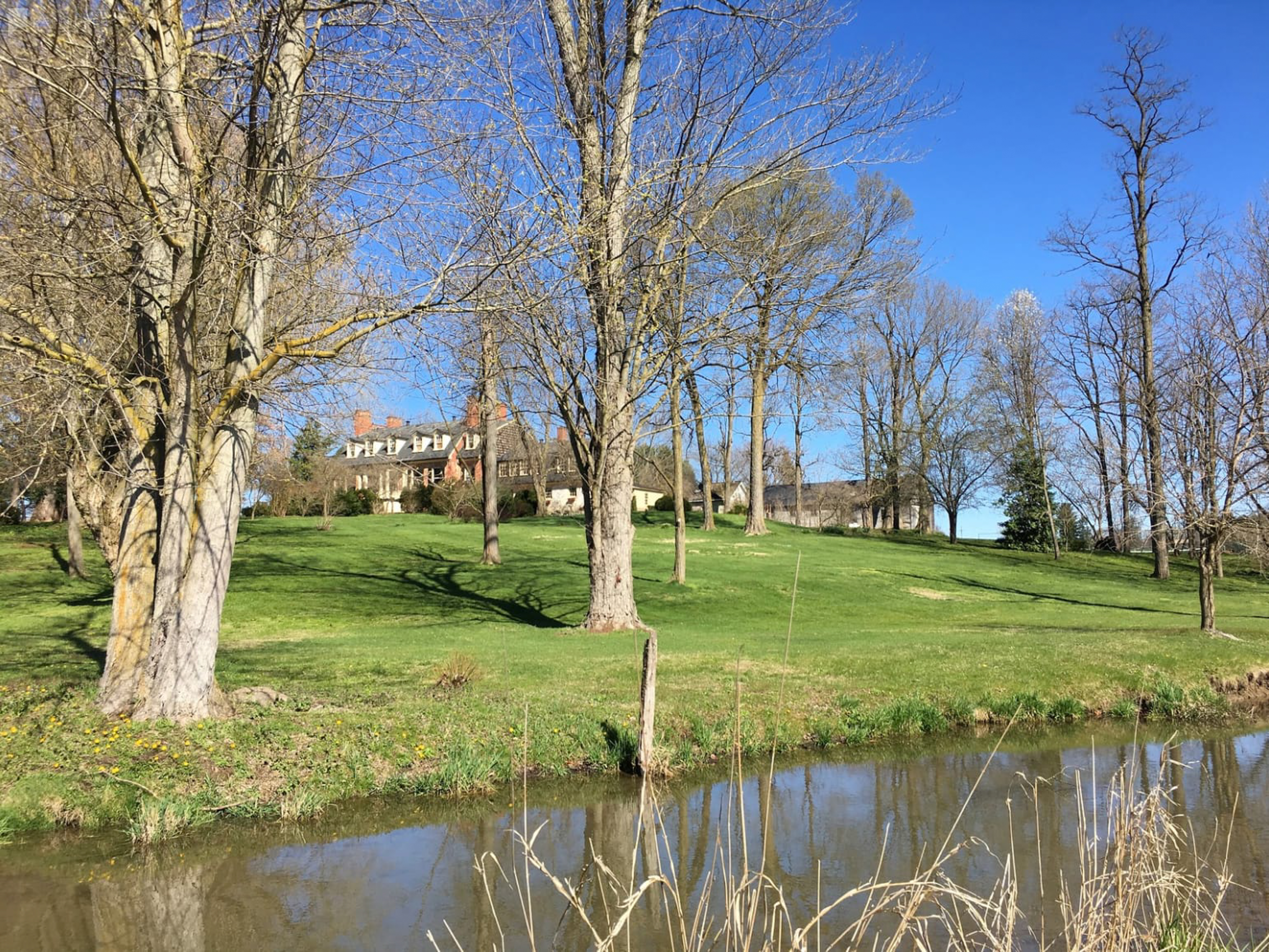
Long Meadows
