= Lake Clarke =

Man-made lake in Pennsylvania, United States

- Location within Pennsylvania
- Location: Lancaster County and York County, Pennsylvania
- Coordinates: 39°55′25″N 76°24′14″W
- Type: reservoir

Lake Clarke in Pennsylvania is a man-made lake along the Susquehanna River formed by the Safe Harbor Dam, a public works project of the 1930s Great Depression and one of the electrification projects of the New Deal. It is approximately 12 miles (19 km) long centered within the Conejohela Valley approximately 6 miles (9.7 km) downstream of historic Wright's Ferry (1630−1901).

Safe Harbor Water Power Corporation provides picnic areas, boat ramps, playgrounds and other public recreation facilities at several locations on both sides of the lake.

Lake Clarke is home to Long Level Marina, Safe Harbor's boat-access areas, Susquehanna Yacht Club, Lake Clarke Rescue Inc., and two private marinas that are located on the York County side of the lake. The United States Coast Guard Auxiliary Flotilla 19-5 (Division 19 (5th District Northern Region (NR)) patrols the area of Lake Clarke and is based out of Auxiliary Station Long Level, 1960 Long Level Road, Wrightsville, on the York County side of the lake.

== See also ==
- List of lakes in Pennsylvania
