= Holtwood Dam =

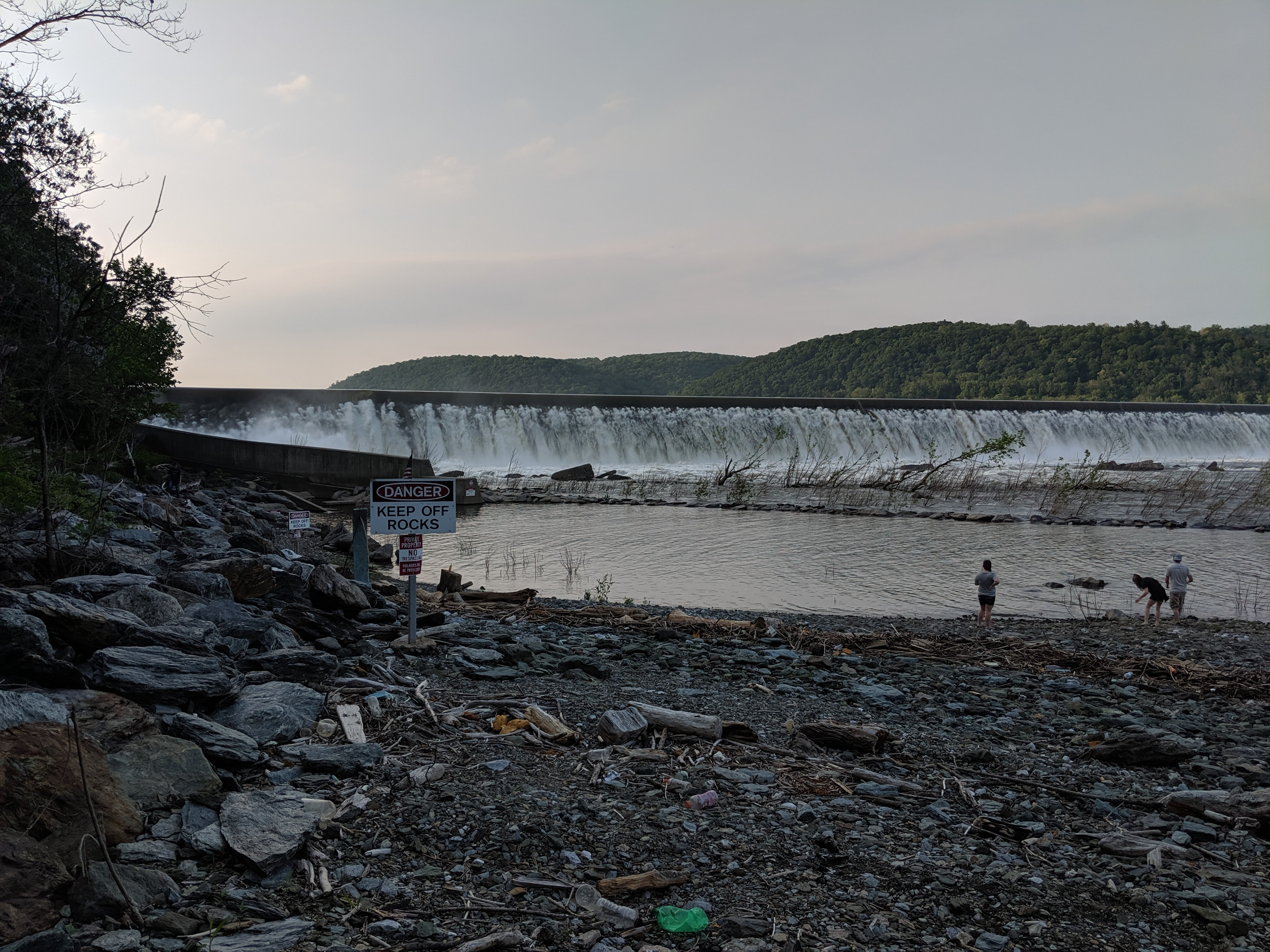
- Holtwood Dam on the Susquehanna River
- Interactive map of Holtwood Dam
- Official name: Holtwood Hydroelectric Plant
- Location: Martic Township, Lancaster County / Lower Chanceford Township, York County, Pennsylvania, USA
- Coordinates: 39°49′36″N 76°20′10″W
- Construction began: 1905
- Opening date: 1910
- Operator: Brookfield Renewable Partners

Dam and spillways
- Impounds: Susquehanna River
- Height: 55 feet (17 m)
- Length: 2,392 feet (729 m)

Reservoir
- Creates: Lake Aldred

Holtwood Dam (also Holtwood Hydroelectric Dam, Holtwood Hydroelectric Plant, McCalls Ferry Dam) is the oldest of three major dams built across the lower Susquehanna River, and the middle location of the three. It was constructed as the McCalls Ferry Dam between 1905 and 1910 by the Pennsylvania Water & Power (PW&P) Company. The dam was renamed Holtwood in honor of two company executives. PW&P merged with Pennsylvania Power & Light (PPL) in 1955. In 2015 Talen Energy took over PPL's generation and immediately sold the Holtwood plant to Brookfield Renewable Energy Partners to comply with federal antitrust requirements.

== Holtwood hydroelectric plant ==
The Holtwood Hydroelectric Plant produces 252 Megawatts of power, using 14 turbine driven generators. The dam consists of a main concrete dam, which is mostly one continuous spillway, with a power house at the eastern end. The water level is raised by wooden flash boards and inflatable dam sections.

The western end of the dam has the original, and ineffective, fish ladder. In the mid 1990s, construction started on a fish lift. The fish lift and dam were damaged by heavy rain and rapid snowmelt from the severe 1996 flood in January of that year. The new fish lift was completed in time for the 1997 season and began lifting american shad and other migratory fish species.

The Kingsbury thrust bearing of Holtwood's Generator No. 5 is designated an International Historic Mechanical Engineering Landmark. Previously used roller bearings would last about 2 months under the generator's 220 ton load, but the Kingsbury bearing has been in use since 1912.

The impounded water, Lake Aldred, was originally dredged for anthracite coal silt, or fines, washed downstream from the Coal Region of Pennsylvania. This coal was used in the adjacent Holtwood Steam Generator station. When Safe Harbor Dam was built upstream, its impoundment was then "mined" for coal as well. More efficient primary mining upstream reduced the availability of fines, and 1972 environmental laws made the dredging impractical, so coal was brought in by train.

== Expansion project ==
In 2008, PPL announced plans to expand the plant with a second powerhouse.

PPL received the approval to add the second powerhouse in November 2009 from the Federal Energy Regulatory Commission. Expansion of the plant started in 2010. Preliminary construction began in January 2010, with full construction beginning in April 2010. The project was completed in December 2013. The second powerhouse added 125 MW of additional capacity, increasing total generating capacity to more than 230 megawatts.

One worker was killed during construction of the second powerhouse. Bruce Hardy, 59, of Bainbridge, Lancaster County, died after being crushed between a wall and an excavator bucket.

The area below the dam is popular with whitewater kayakers, with eleven named hydraulic features. Scheduled whitewater releases from the dam are made, when conditions permit.

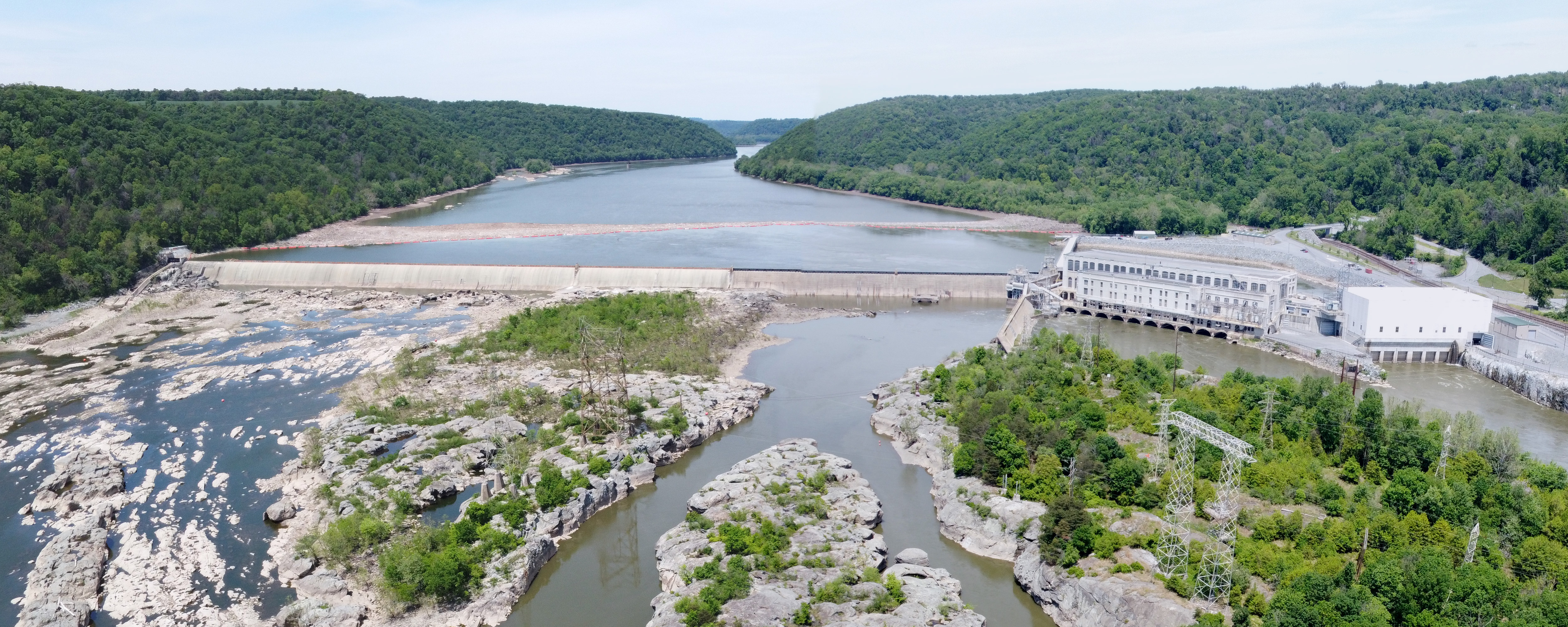
Holtwood Dam on the Susquehanna River

== See also ==
- List of dams and reservoirs of the Susquehanna River
