= Conejohela Flats =

Coordinates: 39.986°N 76.474°W

The Conejohela Flats are a group of islands in the flooded Conejohela Valley, a large floodplain along the southernmost 30 miles (50 km) of the Susquehanna River in Pennsylvania and Maryland in the United States. The valley was flooded primarily during the early 1900s by the construction of the Holtwood, Conowingo, and Safe Harbor dams from 1910 to 1931.

== Geography and history ==
Before the twentieth century, the Conejohela Valley was a marshy floodplain, with extensive wetlands. The Susquehanna River flooded annually in the spring, and there were more damaging floods approximately once per decade. Thick forests surrounded a mixture of small waterfalls, rapids, and marshes. A wide, flat valley formed; the frequently wide river was a substantial barrier to crossing, both for Native Americans and for colonists.

The varied terrain created many nurturing biological habitats, but human passage across the valley and river was extremely difficult. The Susquehanna is very wide in this area, as it nears its mouth on the Chesapeake Bay. This stifled trade across the lower Susquehanna in colonial Pennsylvania and Maryland. In 1730, the Wright's Ferry was established to cross the river. Later the first Columbia-Wrightsville Bridge was built, once believed to be the longest covered bridges in the world. It was replaced by bridges built of structural steel, large enough to carry a range of vehicles. The modern bridge opened in 1930; it was dedicated in 1980 as the Veterans Memorial Bridge.

== Flooding ==
Three dams were built across the Conejohela Valley during the first four decades of the 20th century to provide hydroelectric power for southern Pennsylvania (including electrical power for Amtrak and SEPTA Regional Rail) and to control the annual flooding. It also had the unintended consequence of preventing sediment from the Flats and points upstream from reaching the Chesapeake Bay. The first dam across the lower Susquehanna, the Holtwood Dam, was completed in 1910 as McCalls Ferry Dam. The Conowingo Dam followed in 1928.

The Safe Harbor Dam had the largest effect on the river ecosystem. When it first closed its gates on September 29, 1931, it flooded more than 10 miles of the upper Conejohela Flats, creating the artificial Lake Clarke. Most of the valley was flooded. The few islands that remain in Lake Clarke are a gathering of low, marshy flats about five miles north of Safe Harbor Dam.

== Habitat ==
The remaining Conejohela Flats provide habitats for a number of species. The varying depths of inundated islands on the bottom of Lake Clarke support numerous fresh water feeder fish, pan fish, and large predatory game fish species. The Safe Harbor Dam has become a popular area for local fishing.

The low-lying islands and riparian ecosystem also support dozens of species of birds; the flats are popular among birders.

== See also ==
- Cresap's War
- List of dams and reservoirs of the Susquehanna River
- Susquehanna River dams
  - Safe Harbor Dam
  - Holtwood Dam
  - Conowingo Dam
- Thomas Cresap
