= List of dams and reservoirs of the Susquehanna River =

The Susquehanna River, in the Mid-Atlantic States of the United States, has a collection of dams. These dams are used for power generation, flood control, navigation and recreation. The first dams at Sunbury, Pennsylvania were to support year round ferry crossings.

Among their negative features, dams slow water and trap silt, including pollutants. Conowingo Dam is credited with preventing much of the silt from Pennsylvania from reaching the Chesapeake Bay. The dam spillways can add oxygen to the water. The downstream side of dams is favored by aquatic birds, possibly because the fish that pass through the dam are a bit stunned. The dams also raise the water level, altering the riparian environment. Dams block migratory fish, such as the American shad. The dams from York Haven down to the Chesapeake all have fish ladders or lifts in an attempt to mitigate this.

Communities on the river edge have been displaced, such as Conowingo, Bald Friar, and Glen Cove, Maryland in 1928.

== List of dams ==
Listed from the headwaters toward the mouth of the river. This list includes existing and historic structures, as well as dams off the river that have a major impact on the river. The river also grows its own ice dams during the winter and notable ones will be included.

=== Northern Branch ===
This section may be incomplete.

==== New York ====
- Natural geologic formation at Cooperstown that forms Otsego Lake, the headwaters of the Susquehanna.
- Mill St. Bridge Dam at Cooperstown
- Power generating dam at Goodyear Lake, Colliers Dam (Colliersville, NY). The dam creates a small lake used for motor boating and waterskiing.
- Southside Oneonta Dam
- Rockbottom Dam
- partial dam just above confluence of Chenango River
- Binghamton dam (low head)
- Johnson City Goudy Station Power Plant Dam

==== Pennsylvania ====
- Oakland Dam (built 1880's; enlarged 1920's; breached 1990's; demolished 2023)
- Wilkes-Barre Dam (proposed, inflatable)
- Nanticoke Dam (former canal feeder) 1830-1901
- Nanticoke Dam (proposed, inflatable)

=== West Branch ===
==== Pennsylvania ====
- Curwensville Dam
- Clearfield Dam (low head)
- Shawville Dam (low head)
- Lock Haven Dam (low head)
- Williamsport Dam (low head)

=== Lower Susquehanna ===
| Name | Height | Capacity (MW) | State | Completed | Notes |
|---|---|---|---|---|---|
| Shamokin Dam | | 0 | PA | | Original low head navigation and canal feeder. Demolished 1904. |
| Adam T. Bower Memorial Dam near Sunbury, Pennsylvania | 8 ft (2.4 m) | 0 | PA | | |
| Shamokin Dam power plant low head dam | | 0 | PA | | |
| Clarks Ferry Dam | | 0 | PA | | Canal for the Wiconisco Canal around the site of Clarks Ferry Bridge. Demolished. |
| Dock Street Dam | 6 ft (1.8 m) | 0 | PA | 1913 | |
| York Haven Dam | 18 ft (5.5 m) | 21 | PA | 1904 | |
| Wrightsville Dam | 10 ft (3.0 m) | 0 | PA | 1840 | Former canal feeder, demolished. |
| Safe Harbor Dam | 75 ft (23 m) | 417.5 | PA | 1931 | |
| Holtwood Dam | 55 ft (17 m) | 252 | PA | 1910 | |
| Conowingo Dam | 94 ft (29 m) | 548 | MD | 1928 | |
