= Wright's Ferry =

Historic ferry service in Pennsylvania, U.S.

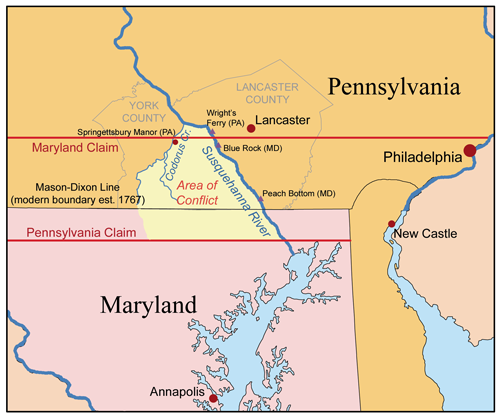
Wright's Ferry (1730-1901) shown on the map near the triangle of disputed territory

Wright's Ferry was a Pennsylvania Colony settlement established by John Wright in 1726, that grew up around the site of an important Inn and Pub anchoring the eastern end of a popular animal powered ferry (1730–1901) and now a historic part of Columbia, Pennsylvania. The complex was important in settling the lands west of the cranky Susquehanna, for without resorting to water craft, the ferry was the first (and for many years, the only) means of crossing the wide watercourse of the relatively shallow Susquehanna River for settlers with a cargo in the southern part of Pennsylvania—which is very wide from Middletown, Dauphin County southerly past Wright's Ferry and grows steadily wider as it nears its mouth at the Chesapeake Bay, and whose banks are steep enough to prevent easy cargo handling from small boats.

As Pennsylvanian settlers started to move into the area, ownership conflicts arose between the English colonies of Maryland and Pennsylvania due to sloppy grants and inaccurate surveys creating conflict with Lord Baltimore of Maryland, who thought his land grant covered this area. William Penn's charter and Lord Baltimore's were in conflict.

Lord Baltimore used a thug named Thomas Cresap in the area to try to prevent settlers from Pennsylvania from creating homesteads. During the 1730s this aggression triggered a series of armed confrontations known as Cresap's War, as Cresap ran off settlers and gave their land to his followers. This long border dispute was finally settled in 1767 when both colonies accepted the Mason–Dixon line as a revised boundary when ordered by the King.

The ferry infrastructure was built in 1730 to transport goods, animals, and people across the Susquehanna River in south central Pennsylvania, between present-day Lancaster and York counties. The ferry was particularly valuable to those new settlers seeking to homestead the west bank of the Susquehanna, which activities drew the interest of Lord Baltimore's agents.

Settlement in this area was recent, as immigrants arrived from Europe for the religious freedom promised by William Penn, or because reports of a fruitful land where one could own instead of rent had reached relatives back in Europe, and others—time enough having passed since the colony was founded for over two generations to grow—moved into the lush region from other areas. For a time, Lord Baltimore used Cresap to run off settlers from the Pennsylvania side, as the two provinces argued over the boundary between them. The ferry was sited just north of the mid-river islands of the Conejohela Flats region, since flooded by a lake created by a dam on the river. Their ownership was disputed due to a mistake in the charter of the Province of Pennsylvania.

The river came to be the political boundary between the unsettled lands of the two counties. Development of the ferry led to the growth of towns around both landings: present-day Columbia (first called Wright's Ferry by pioneers in the area) on the eastern shore and Wrightsville on the western. In Columbia, the ferry landing was located immediately south of the present-day Columbia-Wrightsville Veterans Memorial Bridge. Route 462, the Lincoln Highway, now passes through this area.

== Founding father ==
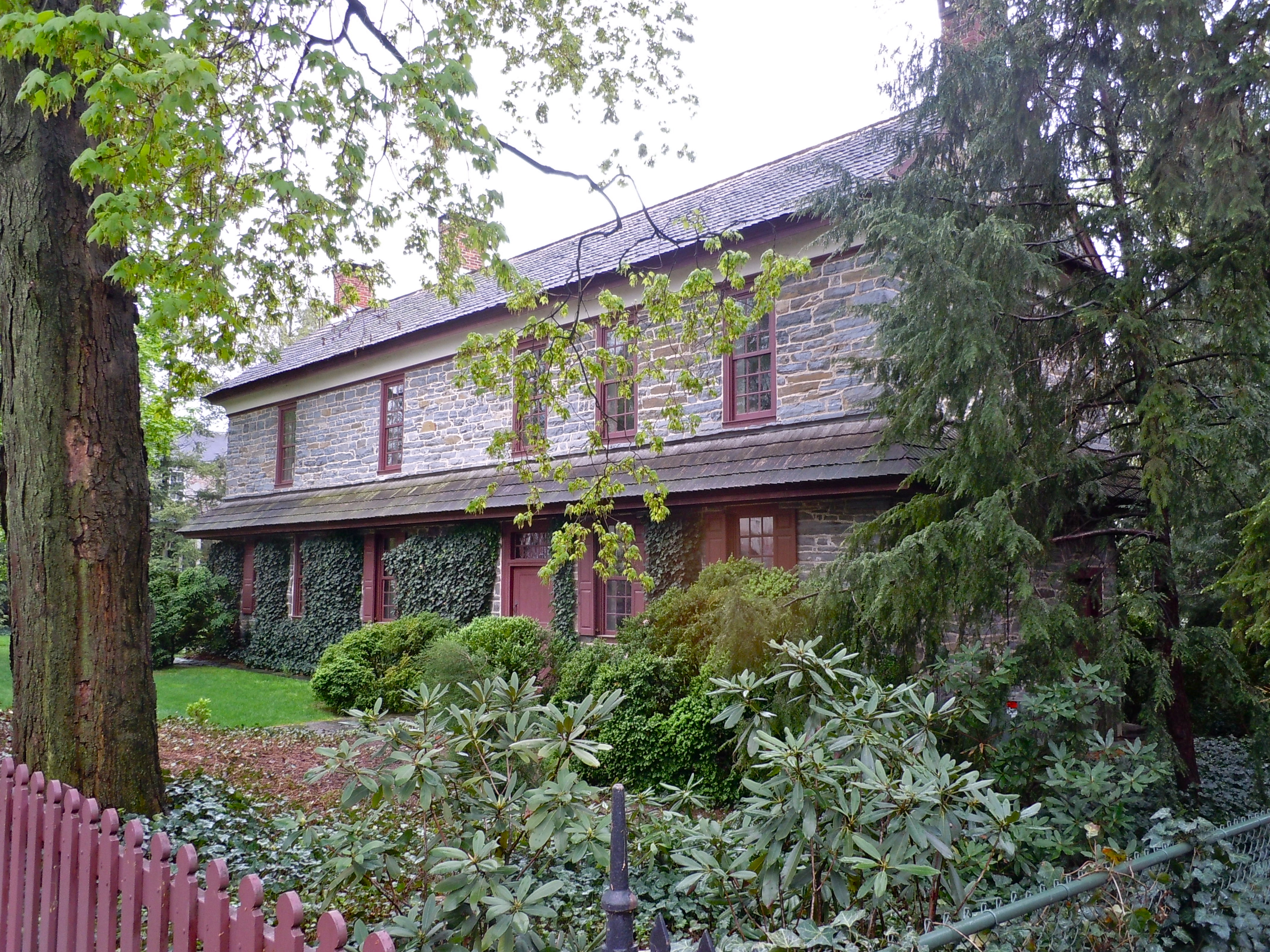
Wright's Ferry Mansion

John Wright was a Quaker who first came to the area in 1724 to explore the land and preach to the local Native Americans. He moved his family to a plot 100 yards from the left bank in 1726, establishing a small settlement along with Robert Barber and Samuel Blunston. In 1730, he was granted a patent to operate a ferry across the river. He developed the ferry with the aid of his two friends.

Wright built a ferry house and a tavern on the eastern shore of the Susquehanna, and the town grew up around it. The tavern has been preserved and is designated as a historic site. It is north of present-day Locust Street, on Front Street along the river, in present-day Columbia. The two-story log tavern, operated by John Wright, Jr. until 1834, consisted of a large room on either end connected by a passageway. When John Jr. married, he moved to York County’s western shore at Wright's Ferry West (later named Wrightsville), where he built another ferry house and tavern.

In later years, John Wright senior became involved in local governmental affairs. He rented his original ferry to others for operating and eventually sold it.

In 1729, after Wright had petitioned William Penn’s son to create a new county, the provincial government took land from Chester County to establish Lancaster County, Pennsylvania, the fourth county in the colony of Pennsylvania. County residents, Native Americans and colonists alike, regularly traveled to Wright’s home to file papers and claims, seek government assistance and redress of issues, and register land deeds. During this time, the town was called “Wright’s Ferry.”

In 1738, his son James Wright built a fine house for his family. It is now known as the Wright’s Ferry Mansion and is the oldest existing house in Columbia. The structure can still be seen at Second and Cherry Streets. (This structure is not the house of James-it is the house of Susanna Wright )

== Ferry operations ==
Traffic heading west from Lancaster, Philadelphia, and other nearby towns regularly traveled through Wright's Ferry, using the ferry to cross the river. As traffic flow increased, the ferry business expanded. Wright used canoes, rafts, and flatboats. In the early 19th century, steamboats were developed that could handle the river. The flatboats were large enough to carry Conestoga wagons and other large vehicles. Due to the volume of traffic, however, wagons, freight, supplies and people often became backed-up in the river town, with waiting periods of several days to cross the river. With 150 to 200 vehicles typically lined up on the Columbia side, ferrymen used chalk to number the wagons.

=== Fee structure ===
The early ferry consisted of two dugout canoes, made in the style of Native Americans, fastened together and carrying a carriage and wagon wheels. When numerous cattle were moved, the canoeist guided a lead animal into the water, holding on by a rope, so that the others would follow. If the lead animal became confused and started swimming in circles, however, the other animals followed until they tired and eventually drowned.

During the years of operation, transport technology improved. Eventually there were water vessels that could convey even the heavy Conestoga wagons. These were being built in this era in Conestoga, Pennsylvania on the east bank of the river.

- Typical fares were as follows:
  - Coach with four passengers and drawn by five horses-9 shillings,
  - 4-horse wagon-3 shillings and 9 pence,
  - man and horse-6 pence.

Fares were reduced in 1787 due to competition from Anderson's Ferry, located further upriver near Marietta, Pennsylvania.

In later years, Wright rented the ferry to others and eventually sold it. Due to increased competition from the railroad in the late 19th century, and construction of a railroad bridge over the Susquehanna, the ferry finally ceased operations in 1901. This reduced traffic and associated business in Columbia.
