= Northwest Lancaster County River Trail =

Trail along Susquehanna River in Lancaster County, Pennsylvania

- Length: 14.0 mi (22.5 km)
- Location: Lancaster County, Pennsylvania
- Trailheads: Falmouth, Pennsylvania; 40.119207°N 76.708482°W; Columbia, Pennsylvania; 40.030275°N 76.507531°W
- Use: Hiking, bicycling, cross-country skiing and snowshoeing
- Difficulty: Easy, ADA accessible
- Season: Year-round, dawn to dusk
- Hazards: Flooding in lower sections, traffic at road crossings, ice in Point Rock Tunnel
- Surface: Asphalt
- Website: http://nwrt.info/
Trail map

The Northwest Lancaster County River Trail is a 14-mile (23 km) trail located along the Susquehanna River in Lancaster County, Pennsylvania, United States of America.

The trail runs alongside the Norfolk Southern rail line and the former Main Line Canal. The Charles Greenway section of the trail is a smaller portion of a proposed 14-mile (23 km) trail throughout Lancaster County and ends just before the Dauphin County line. The trail begins in the Bainbridge section of the township and follows front street all the way to Decatur Street in Marietta. The trail provides scenic views of both the Susquehanna River and area farmland. The centerpiece of the trail is Riverfront Park, which is located directly in the center of the trail and plays host to different meeting areas. The trail is open dawn to dusk, year round and may be used by walkers, joggers, cyclists, snowshoers and cross country skiers.

== Historical development ==
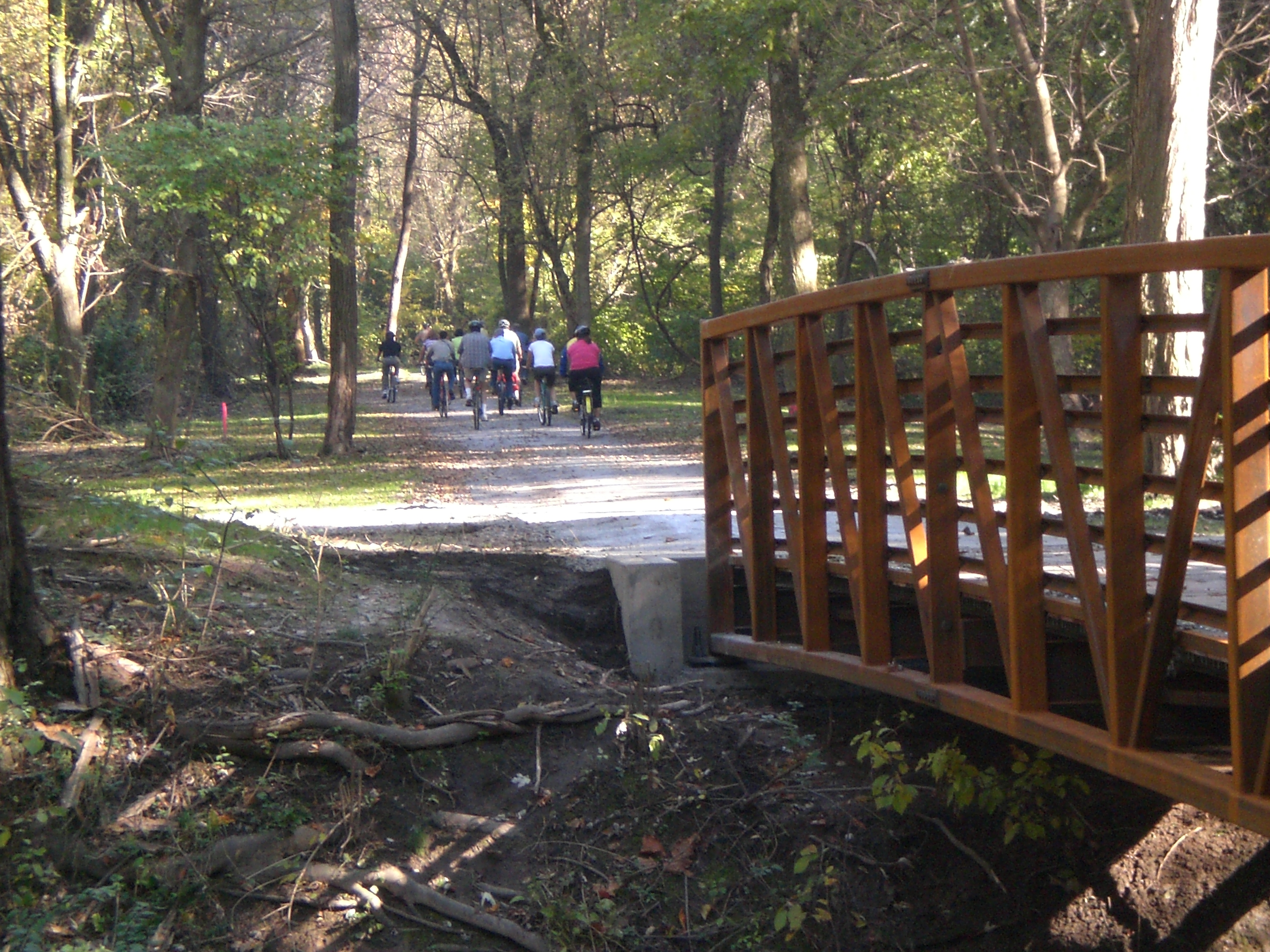
Local bicyclists cross the newly finished bridge on the Greenway

=== Historical significance ===
The Northwest River Trail is a proposed 14 mile trail throughout Lancaster county and the frontier of Dauphin County. The trail runs along the eastern portion of the old Main Line Canal system, which contributed to the transport of many different products throughout the state. The Charles Greenway section of the Northwest River Trail runs alongside or on part of the original canal way. In 2007 the Greenway was created through the strong leadership of the East Donegal Township supervisors and the assistance of Pennsylvania state grants. The majority of the land was donated to the township by the Charles family in honor of their father, who lived on the shores of the Susquehanna for many years. The modern day trail was completed in the fall of 2009 and has been open to the public ever since.

=== Trail’s history and evolution ===
The earliest trail of the Charles Greenway was a small and unpaved hiking trail that stretched 2.3 miles. In 2009 the trail was widened, paved, and extended another 1.7 miles to better accommodate bikers and inline skaters. Currently the trail stretches to the northernmost tip of the township and ends close to the shops and Railroad House Inn on front street. Eventually the trail will connect to the Conoy Canal Trail in the north and the Chickies Rock trail in the south. The entire Northwest River Trail will eventually stretch 14 miles up and down the Susquehanna River in Lancaster County.

== Trail development ==
=== Design and construction ===
All of the 11 miles of the Charles Greenway trail is paved. The trail was upgraded in 2010 from strictly a hiking trail to a multi-purpose trail accommodating hikers, bikers and inline skaters. The majority of the trail runs parallel to the Susquehanna River, the remaining portions of the trail cut into woodlands and agricultural lands providing scenic views throughout the trail. The trail finishes close to the shops on front street and the Railroad Inn.

=== Trail Amenities ===
There is parking at both trail heads and Riverfront park, however there is only street parking near the Decatur street trail head located in Marietta. Restrooms are located at the Decatur street trail head. Riverfront Park is located midway through the trail. The park also has restrooms and a pavilion that can be rented out upon request. Currently East Donegal Township is looking into ways to create and finance more amenities for the trail and to extend the trail further into the township.

== Community ==
=== Special events ===
In 2012 the Donegal Foundation hosted their first annual event at the Charles Greenway River Trail to raise money and awareness for the foundation. The event was a 5k race to raise awareness for the foundation and the event will be held at the trail annually. The Donegal Foundation and East Donegal township are the only major supporters of the Charles Greenway section of the Northwest River rail trail, but the township is currently looking to add more sponsors and create a better partnership with the other townships associated with the trail.

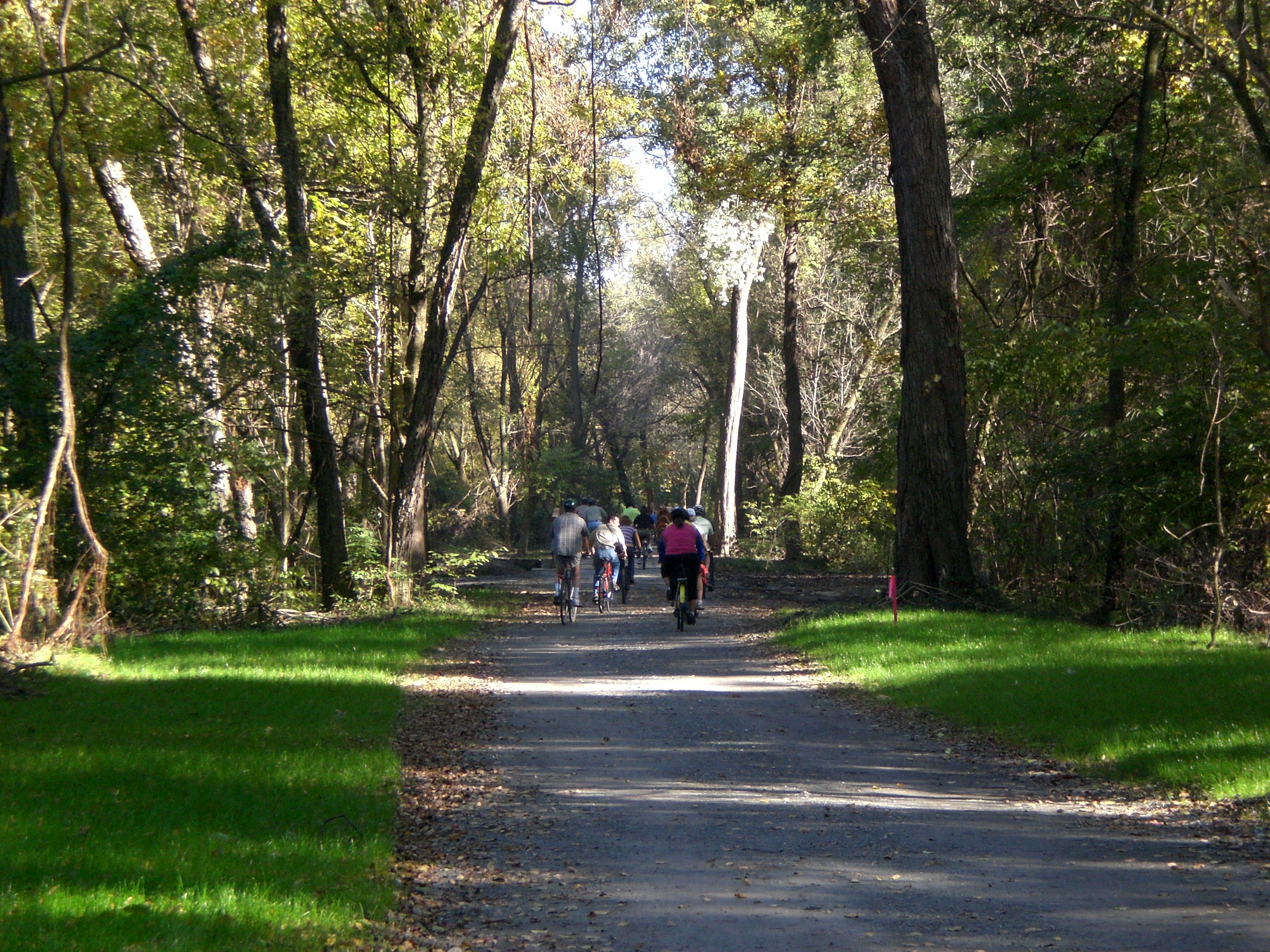
The Charles Greenway trail.
