= Conoy Canal Trail =

- Length: 3.7 mi (6.0 km)
- Location: Falmouth, PA to Bainbridge, PA
- Trailheads: Falmouth Trailhead; Bainbridge Trailhead
- Use: Hiking, biking, fishing, running
- Difficulty: Moderate, Not handicap accessible
- Surface: Grass, rock, dirt

The Conoy Canal Trail is a section of the planned Northwest Lancaster County River Trail, that runs for 3.75 miles along the Conewago Canal which stretches from Bainbridge to Falmouth. The canal was opened in 1797. The trail was developed for hikers, bikers, fisherman, and runners in the early 2000s.

== Historical development ==
The Conoy Canal was originally built to bypass the Conewago Falls on the Susquehanna River back in the eighteenth century. The canal is part of the original Mainline Canal which ran from Harrisburg to Pittsburgh. The Conoy section of the canal ran as part of the eastern division of the mainline system. Ruins of the canal can still be seen along its route, including the restored lock at Falmouth. Stone walls that separate the trail from the river and the ditch, which are all that remain of the old waterway, are found between the towpath and railroad line.

== Trail development ==
The trail follows the canal, and with minimal construction along the path, it remains mostly unpaved. There are several bridges throughout the trail allowing passage over small streams or eroded sections of the canal. Remains of the canal exist all along the trail, some of which still bear the original stonework and locks dating back to the canal's creation in 1797.

Picnic area at the beginning of the trail at the Falmouth Trailhead, which is also lined with one hundred feet of picket fence and patriotism. Porta potties are stationed at Bainbridge and Falmouth trailheads in season. Access is available along Route 441, at the Falmouth Boat Access, Kings Road, Prescott Road, and Race Street in Bainbridge.

== Community ==
While the trail is lesser known and not as populated as some of the other nearby trails, it has a loyal following of hikers, mountain bikers, and fishermen who enjoy its serenity, seclusion, and an intimate connection to nature.

The Conoy Canal Trail is supported and under the supervision of the Conoy Township. The trail also receives sponsorship from Lancaster County Solid Waste Management.
