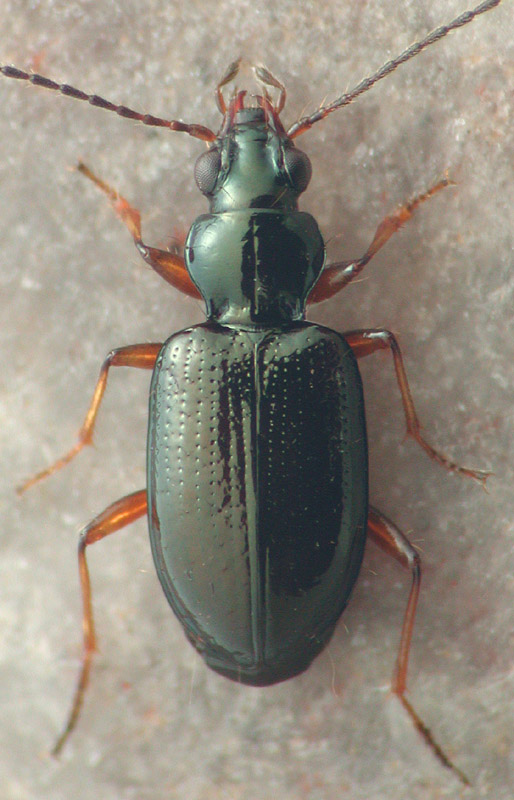

Scientific classification
- Kingdom: Animalia
- Phylum: Arthropoda
- Class: Insecta
- Order: Coleoptera
- Suborder: Adephaga
- Family: Carabidae
- Genus: Bembidion
- Species: B. semistriatum

Binomial name
- Bembidion semistriatum (Haldeman, 1843)

= Bembidion semistriatum =

Species of beetle

Bembidion semistriatum is a species of ground beetle in the family Carabidae. It is found in North America.
