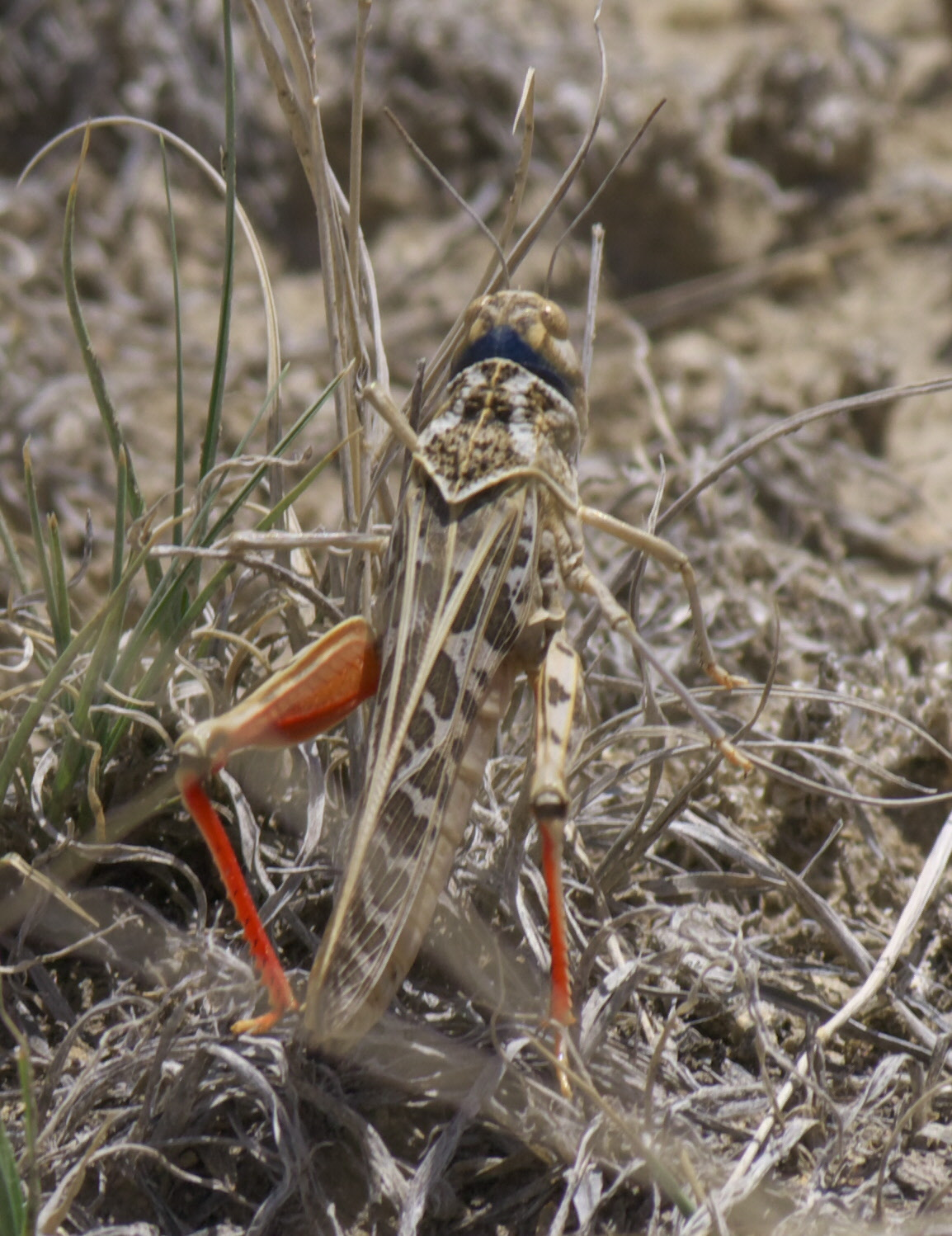

Scientific classification
- Kingdom: Animalia
- Phylum: Arthropoda
- Clade: Pancrustacea
- Class: Insecta
- Order: Orthoptera
- Suborder: Caelifera
- Family: Acrididae
- Genus: Xanthippus
- Species: X. corallipes

Binomial name
- Xanthippus corallipes (Haldeman, 1852)

= Xanthippus corallipes =

Species of grasshopper

Xanthippus corallipes, the red-shanked grasshopper, is a species of band-winged grasshopper in the family Acrididae. It is found in Central America and North America.

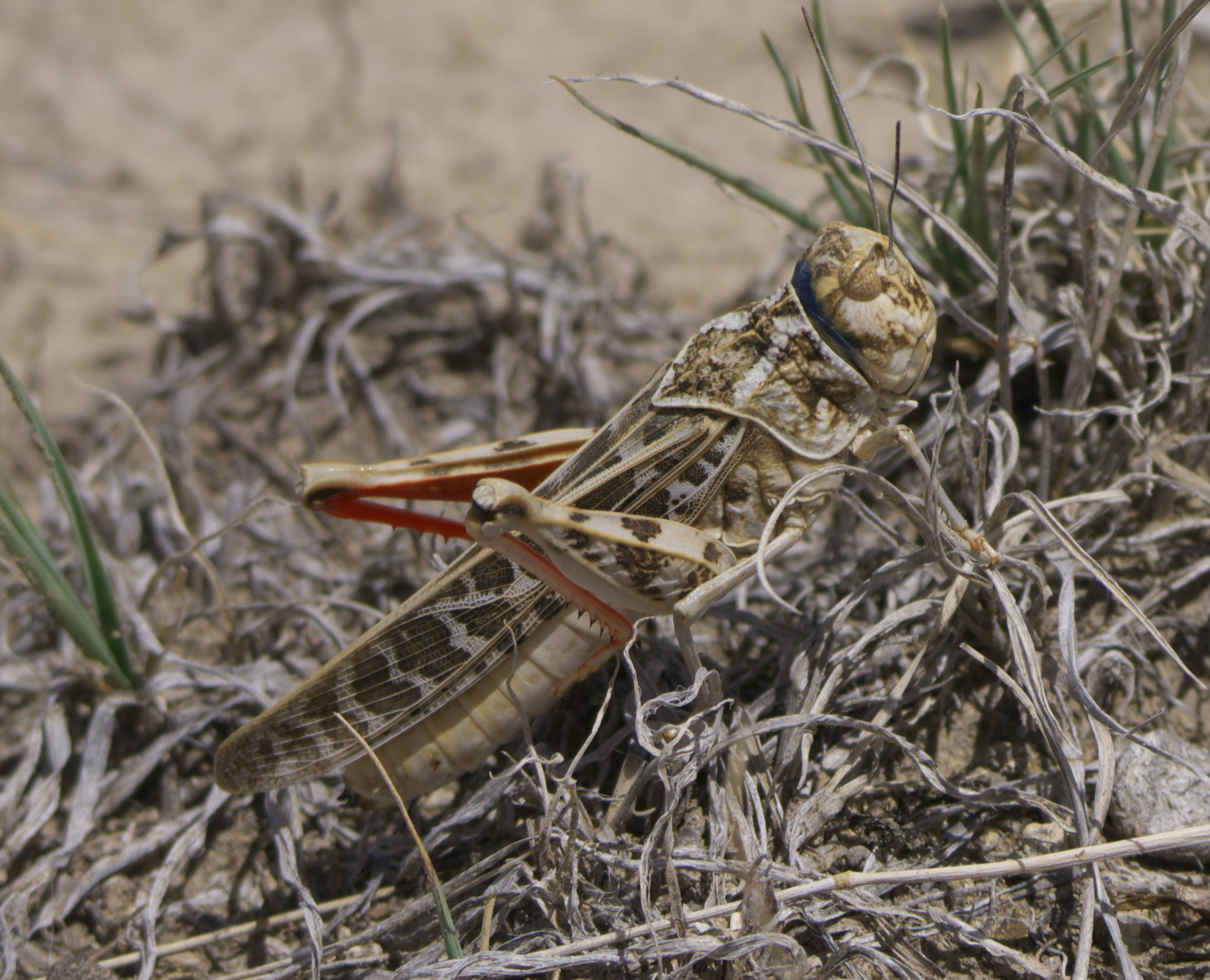
Red-shanked grasshopper, Xanthippus corallipes

== Subspecies ==
These seven subspecies belong to the species Xanthippus corallipes:

- Xanthippus corallipes affrictus^{b}
- Xanthippus corallipes altivolus^{b}
- Xanthippus corallipes buckelli^{b}
- Xanthippus corallipes corallipes^{b}
- Xanthippus corallipes latifasciatus^{b}
- Xanthippus corallipes leprosus^{b}
- Xanthippus corallipes pantherinus^{b}

Data sources: i = ITIS, c = Catalogue of Life, g = GBIF, b = Bugguide.net
