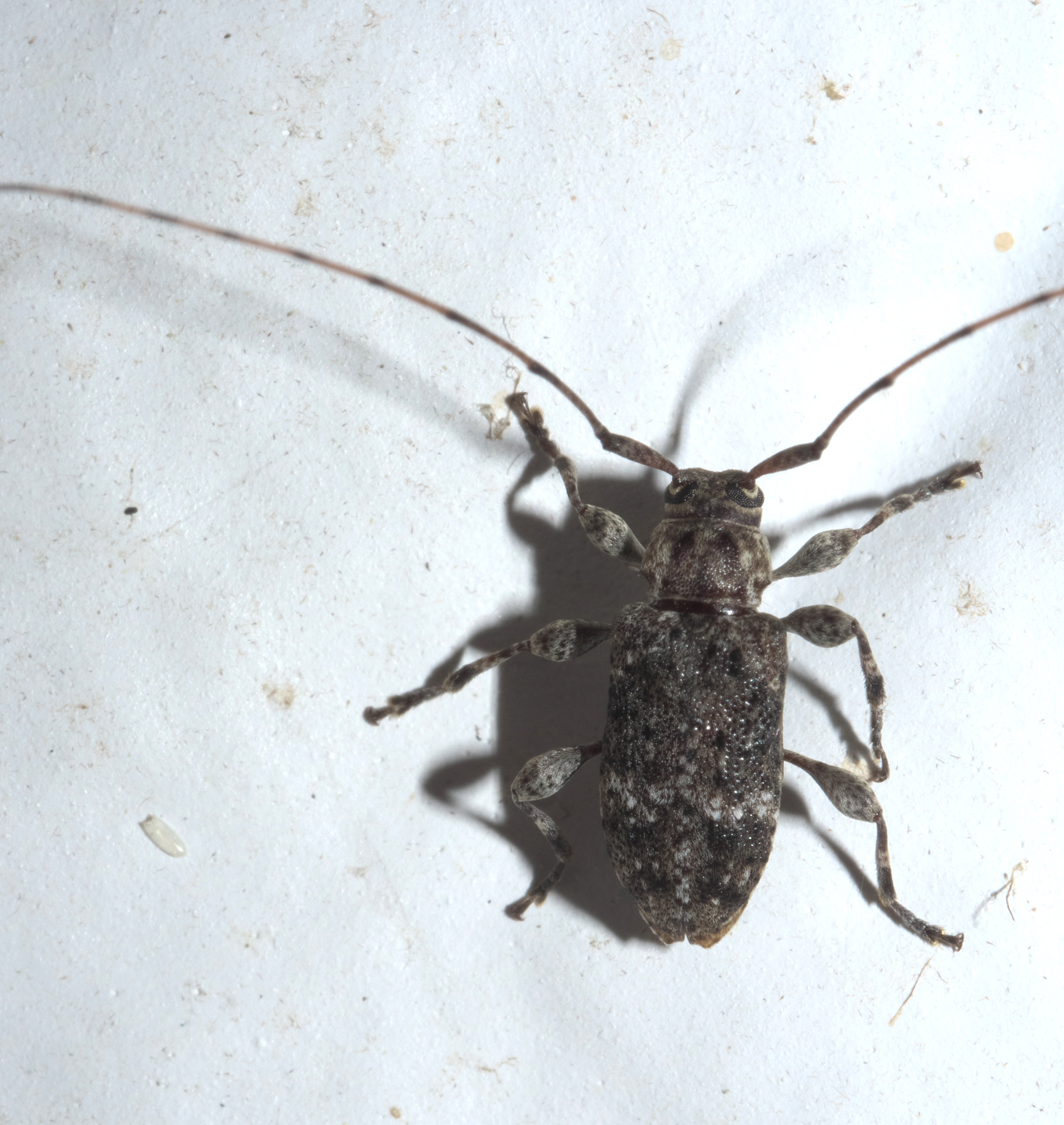

Scientific classification
- Domain: Eukaryota
- Kingdom: Animalia
- Phylum: Arthropoda
- Class: Insecta
- Order: Coleoptera
- Suborder: Polyphaga
- Infraorder: Cucujiformia
- Family: Cerambycidae
- Genus: Sternidius
- Species: S. punctatus

Binomial name
- Sternidius punctatus (Haldeman, 1847)

= Sternidius punctatus =

Species of beetle

Sternidius punctatus is a species of flat-faced longhorn in the family of beetles known as Cerambycidae.

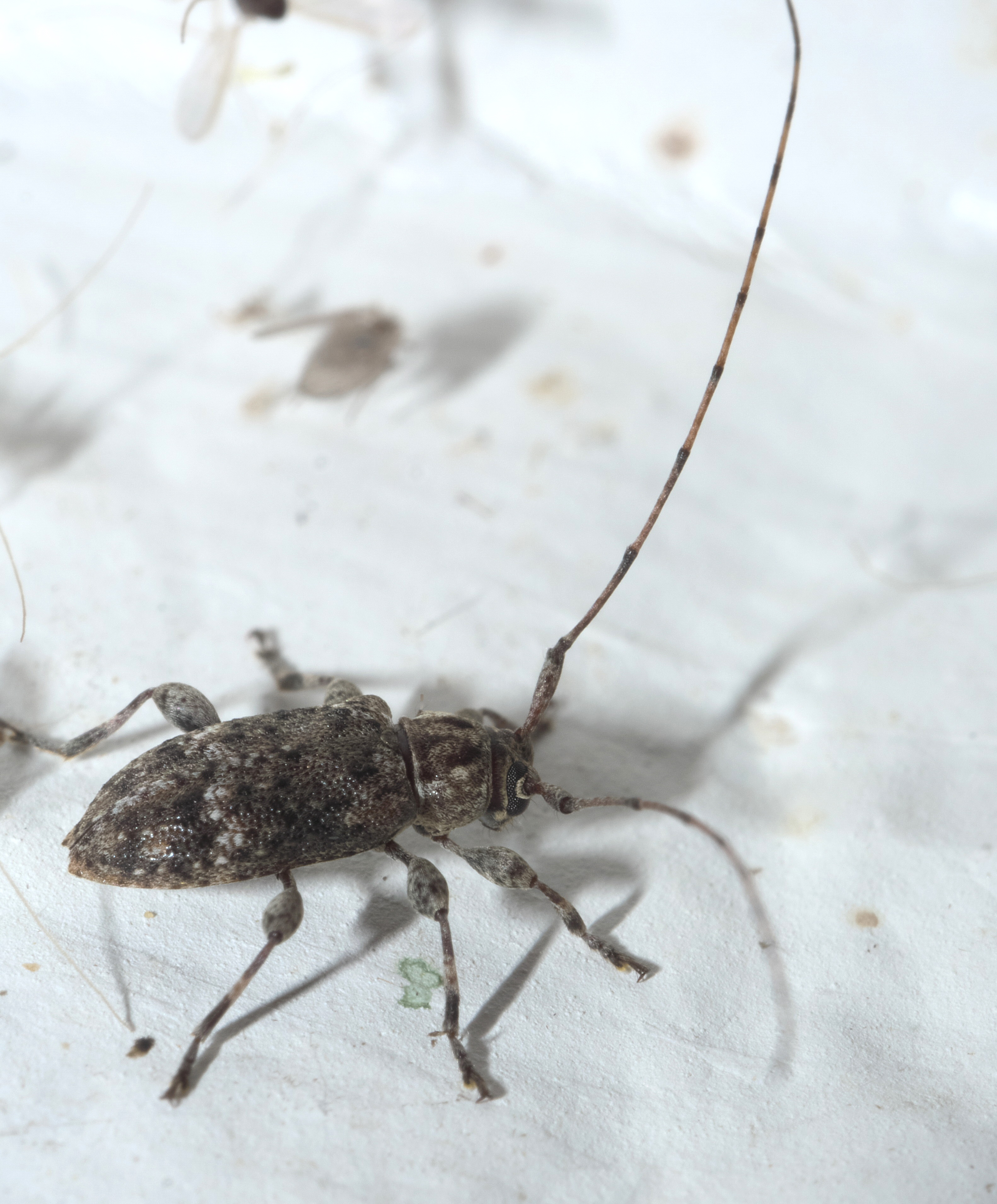
