= Chickies Formation =

Mapped bedrock unit in the United States

- Stratigraphic range: Cambrian
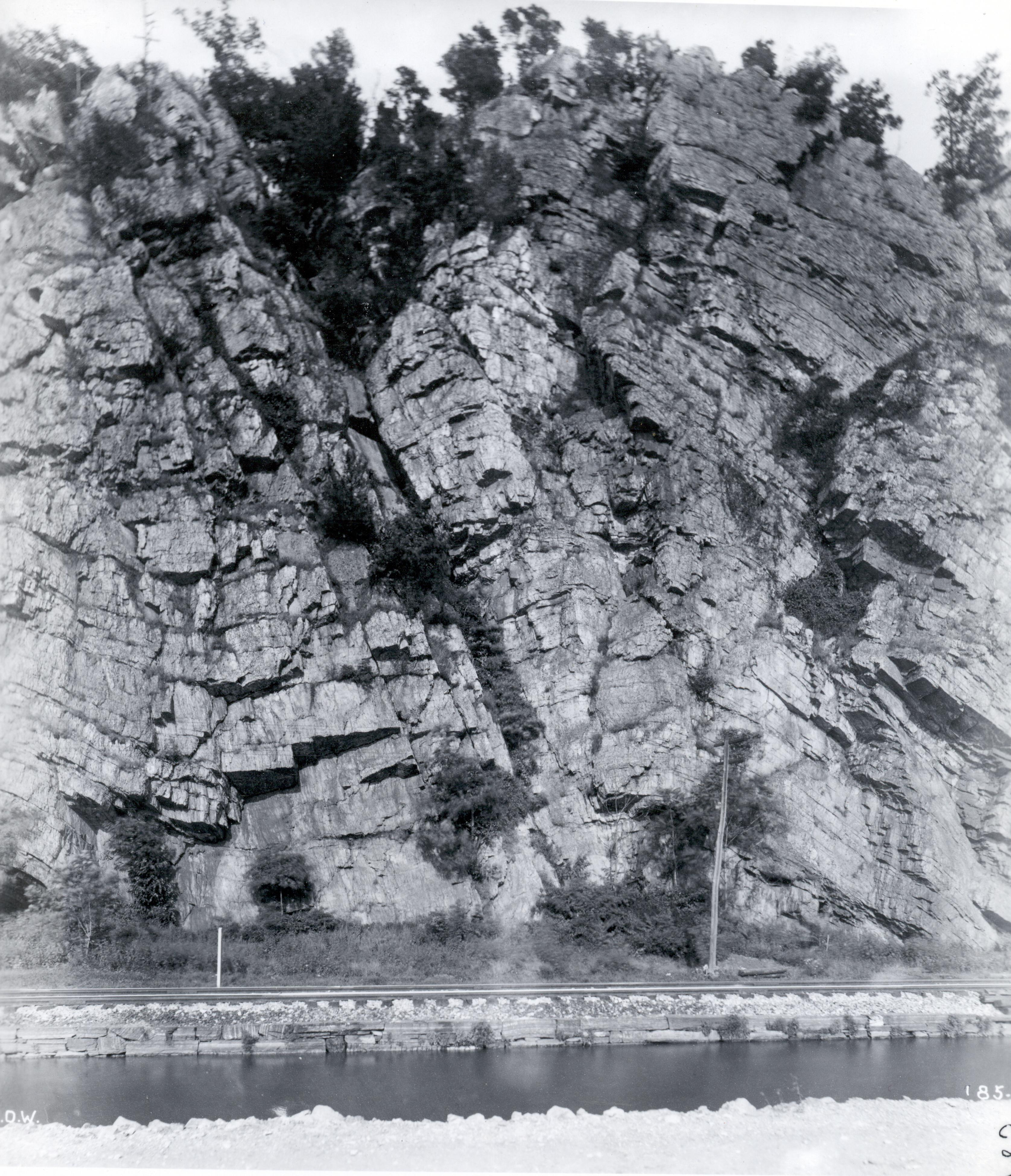
- Chickies Rock (1892)
- Type: Metamorphic
- Sub-units: Hellam Conglomerate Member

Lithology
- Primary: Quartzite
- Other: Slate, schist

Location
- Region: Pennsylvania, New Jersey, Maryland
- Country: United States
- Extent: Mid-Atlantic United States

Type section
- Named for: Chickies Rock
- Named by: J. Peter Lesley
- Year defined: 1876

The Cambrian Chickies Formation is a mapped bedrock unit in Pennsylvania, New Jersey, and Maryland. It is named for Chickies Rock, north of Columbia, Pennsylvania, along the Susquehanna River.

== Description ==
The Chickies Formation is described as a light-gray to white, hard, massive quartzite and quartz schist with thin interbedded dark slate at the top. Included at the base is the Hellam Conglomerate Member. It is a rare metamorphic rock that has fossils; Skolithos is found throughout the formation.

== Depositional age ==
Relative age dating places the Chickies in the Lower Cambrian Period, deposited between 542 and 520 million years ago (±2 million years).

== Economic geology ==
The Chickies is quarried as a building stone and for aggregate. The stone used to build the restrooms at Valley Forge National Historical Park is Chickies quartzite.

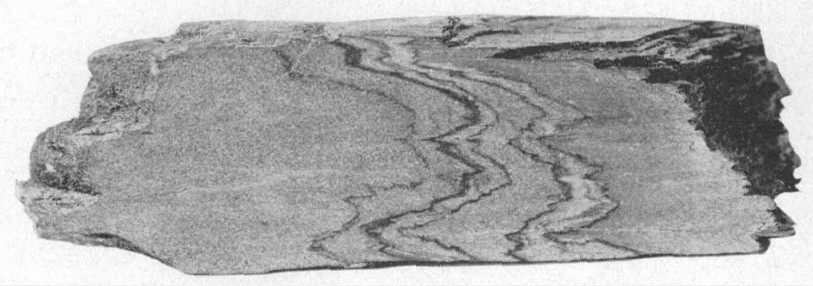
Specimen of Chickies Banded Slate. Shows older folded schistosity parallel to bedding cut by younger cleavage inclined to bedding.

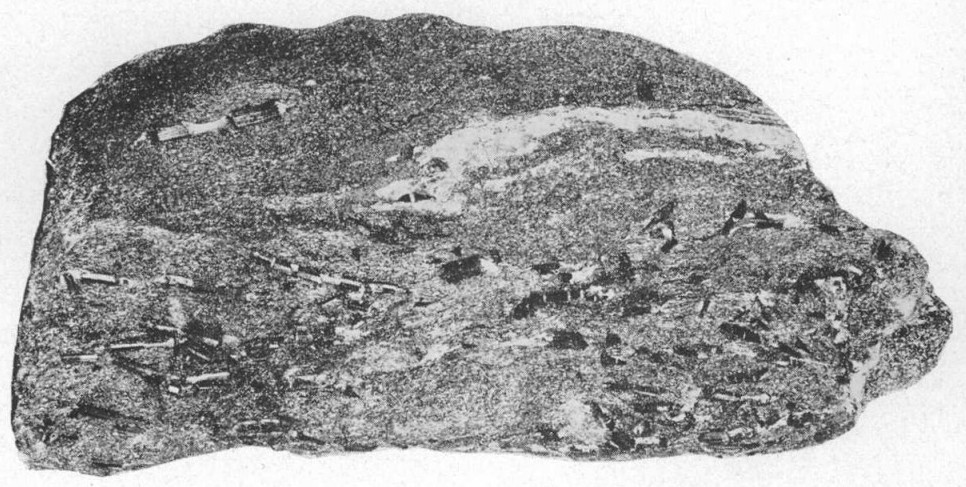
Specimen of mica schist from upper beds of Chickies Quartzite. Shows stretched epigenetic tourmaline.

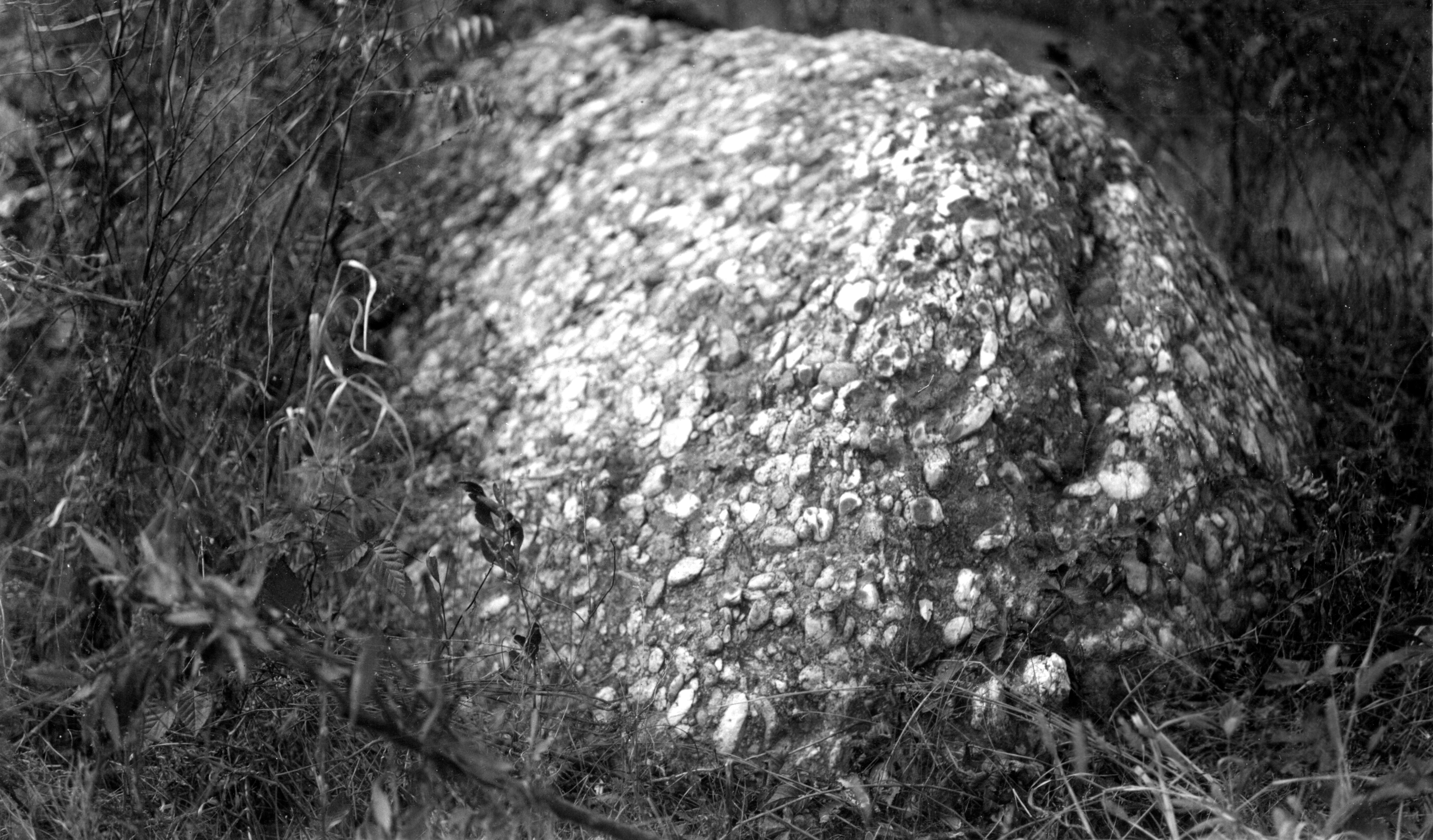
Cobble bed in Hellam Conglomerate Member

== See also ==
- Geology of Pennsylvania
