= Sternidius variegatus =

Scientific classification
- Domain: Eukaryota
- Kingdom: Animalia
- Phylum: Arthropoda
- Class: Insecta
- Order: Coleoptera
- Suborder: Polyphaga
- Infraorder: Cucujiformia
- Family: Cerambycidae
- Genus: Sternidius
- Species: S. variegatus

Binomial name
- Sternidius variegatus (Haldeman, 1847)

Species of beetle

Sternidius variegatus is a species of longhorn beetles of the subfamily Lamiinae. It was described by Haldeman in 1847.
