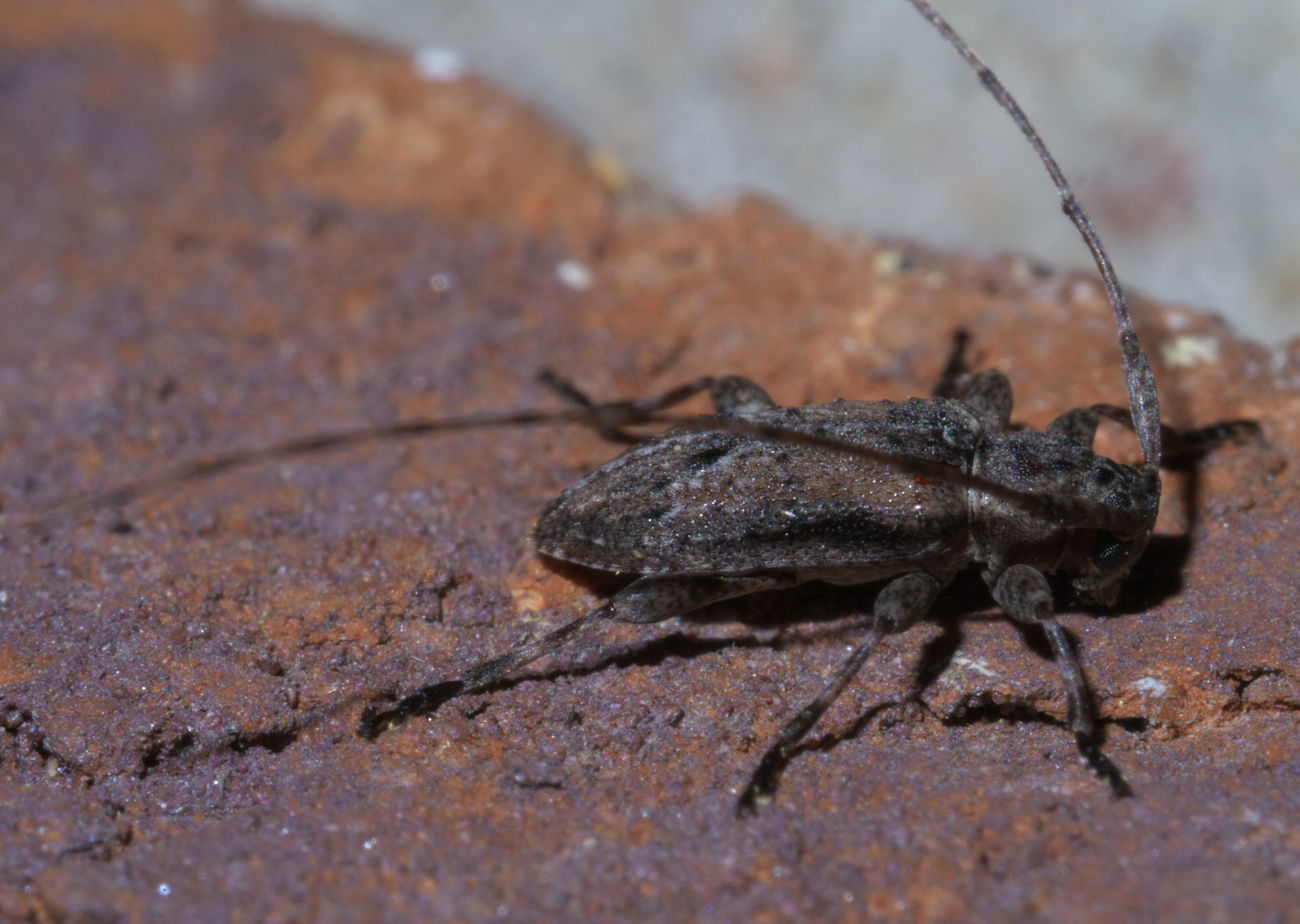

Scientific classification
- Kingdom: Animalia
- Phylum: Arthropoda
- Class: Insecta
- Order: Coleoptera
- Suborder: Polyphaga
- Infraorder: Cucujiformia
- Family: Cerambycidae
- Tribe: Acanthocinini
- Genus: Sternidius; LeConte, 1873

Synonyms
- Astyleiopus Dillon, 1956

= Sternidius =

Genus of beetles

Sternidius is a genus of flat-faced longhorns in the family of beetles known as Cerambycidae. There are at least 20 described species in Sternidius.

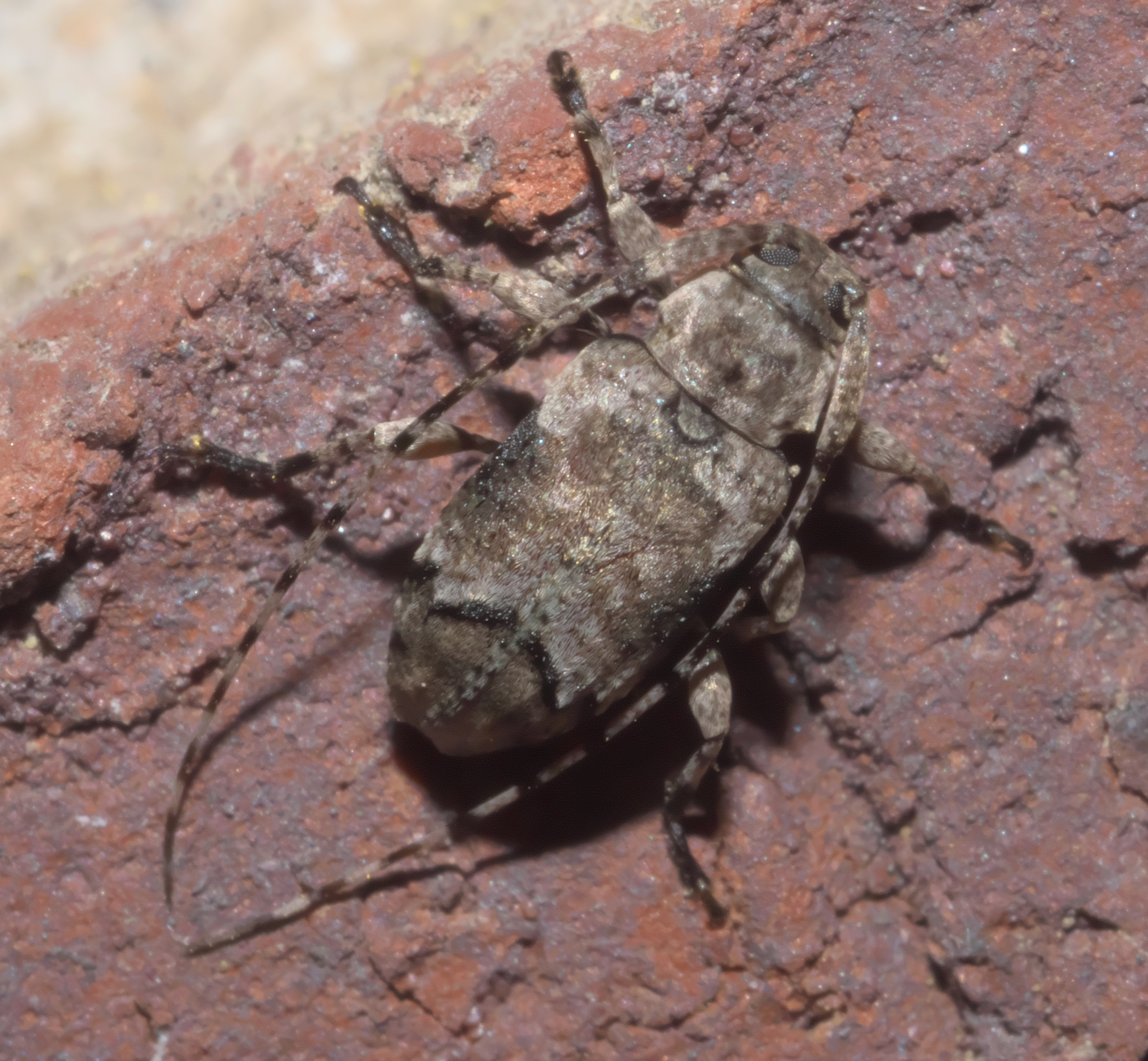

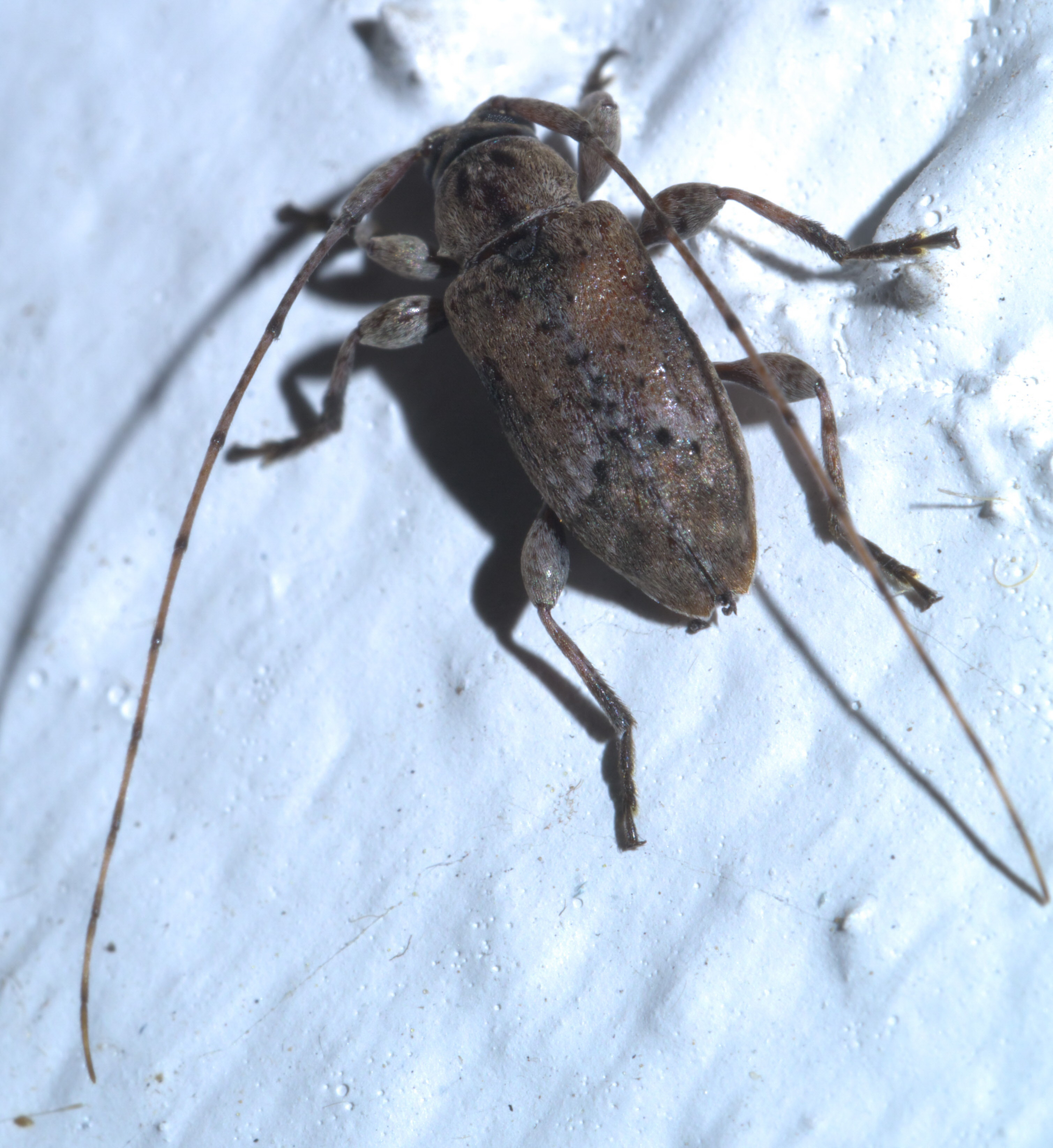

== Species ==
These 20 species belong to the genus Sternidius:

- Sternidius alpha (Say, 1827)^{c g b}
- Sternidius batesi (Gahan, 1892)^{c g}
- Sternidius centralis (LeConte, 1884)^{c g b}
- Sternidius chemsaki Lewis, 1977^{c g}
- Sternidius crassulus LeConte, 1873^{c g}
- Sternidius decorus (Fall, 1907)^{c g b}
- Sternidius gracilipes (Linsley, 1942)^{c g}
- Sternidius imitans (Knull, 1936)^{c g b}
- Sternidius incognitus Lewis, 1977^{c g}
- Sternidius mimeticus (Casey, 1891)^{c g b}
- Sternidius misellus (LeConte, 1852)^{c g b}
- Sternidius naeviicornis (Bates, 1885)^{c g}
- Sternidius nivosus (Linsley, 1942)^{c g}
- Sternidius pantherinus Zayas, 1975^{c g}
- Sternidius punctatus (Haldeman, 1847)^{c g b}
- Sternidius rosaliae (Linsley, 1942)^{c g}
- Sternidius rossi (Linsley, 1942)^{c g}
- Sternidius subfascianus (White, 1855)^{c g}
- Sternidius variegatus (Haldeman, 1847)^{i}
- Sternidius wiltii (Horn, 1880)^{c g b}

Data sources: i = ITIS, c = Catalogue of Life, g = GBIF, b = Bugguide.net
