= Xanthippus aquilonius =

Scientific classification
- Kingdom: Animalia
- Phylum: Arthropoda
- Clade: Pancrustacea
- Class: Insecta
- Order: Orthoptera
- Suborder: Caelifera
- Family: Acrididae
- Tribe: Hippiscini
- Genus: Xanthippus
- Species: X. aquilonius

Binomial name
- Xanthippus aquilonius Otte, 1984

Species of grasshopper

Xanthippus aquilonius is a species of band-winged grasshopper in the family Acrididae. It is found in North America.
