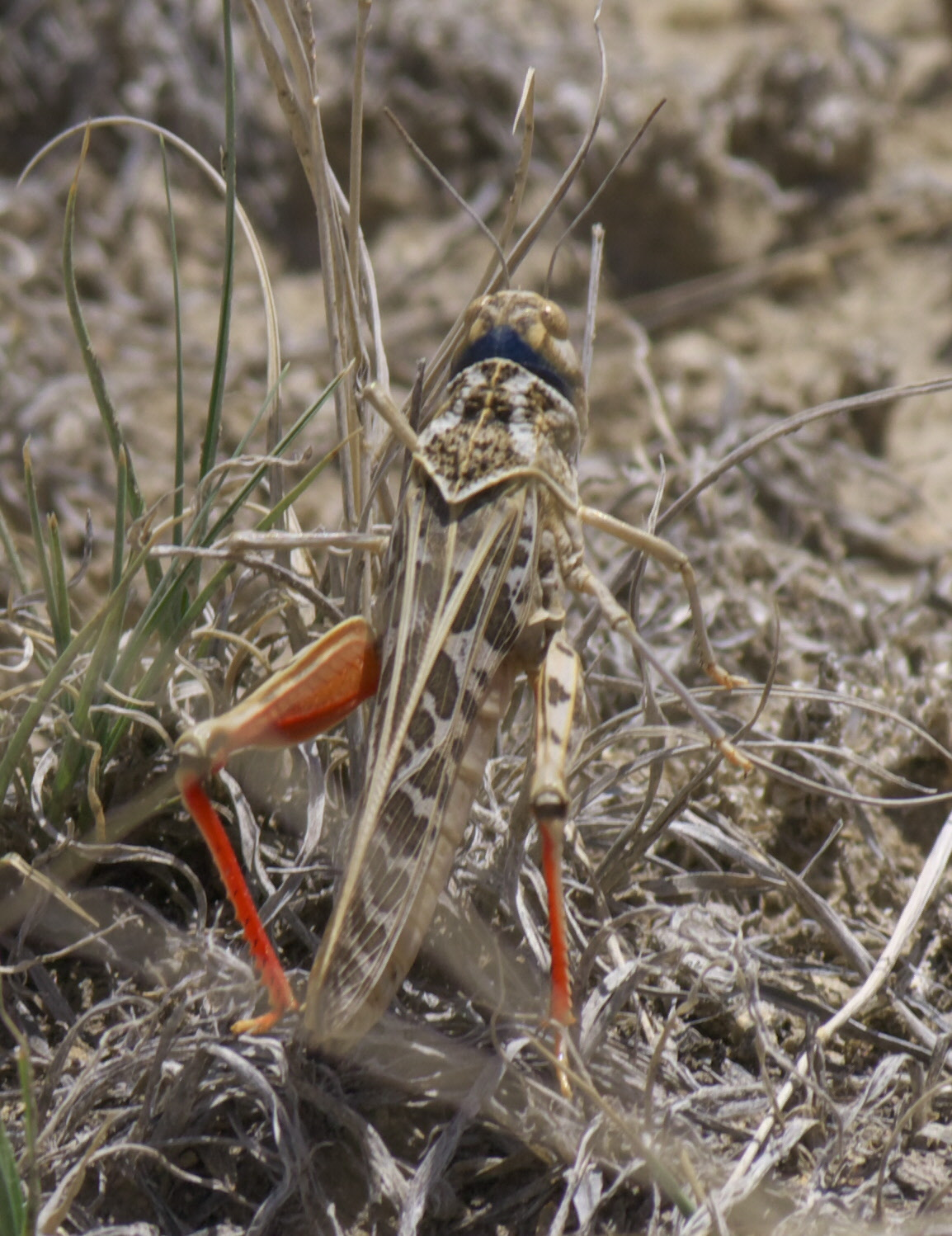
- Xanthippus corallipes

Scientific classification
- Kingdom: Animalia
- Phylum: Arthropoda
- Clade: Pancrustacea
- Class: Insecta
- Order: Orthoptera
- Suborder: Caelifera
- Family: Acrididae
- Subfamily: Oedipodinae
- Tribe: Hippiscini
- Genus: Xanthippus; Saussure, 1884

= Xanthippus (grasshopper) =

Genus of grasshoppers

Xanthippus is a genus of band-winged grasshoppers in the family Acrididae. There are about six described species in Xanthippus.

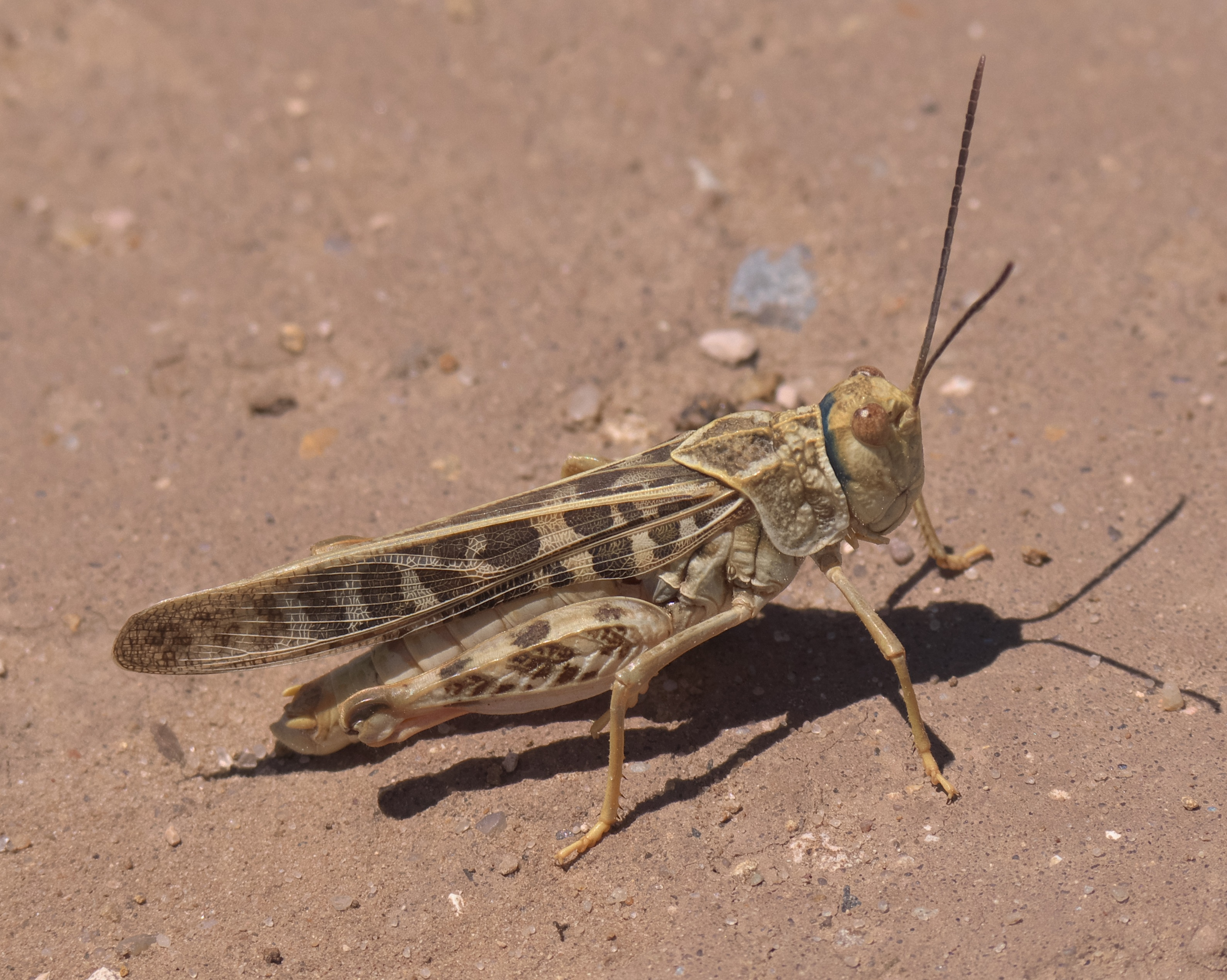
Xanthippus corallipes pantherinus

== Species ==
These six species belong to the genus Xanthippus:

- Xanthippus aquilonius Otte, 1984^{i c g b}
- Xanthippus brooksi Vickery, 1967^{i c g b}
- Xanthippus corallipes (Haldeman, 1852)^{i c g b} — Red-shanked grasshopper
- Xanthippus montanus (Thomas, 1871)^{i c g b} — Sandhills band-wing grasshopper
- Xanthippus olancha (Caudell, 1921)^{i c g}
- Xanthippus sierra (Saussure, 1884)^{b} — Sierra grasshopper

Data sources: i = ITIS, c = Catalogue of Life, g = GBIF, b = Bugguide.net
