= Xanthippus brooksi =

Scientific classification
- Kingdom: Animalia
- Phylum: Arthropoda
- Clade: Pancrustacea
- Class: Insecta
- Order: Orthoptera
- Suborder: Caelifera
- Family: Acrididae
- Tribe: Hippiscini
- Genus: Xanthippus
- Species: X. brooksi

Binomial name
- Xanthippus brooksi Vickery, 1967

Species of grasshopper

Xanthippus brooksi is a species of band-winged grasshopper in the family Acrididae. It is found in North America.
