= Locust Grove (Bainbridge, Pennsylvania) =

Historic house in Pennsylvania, United States

- U.S. National Register of Historic Places
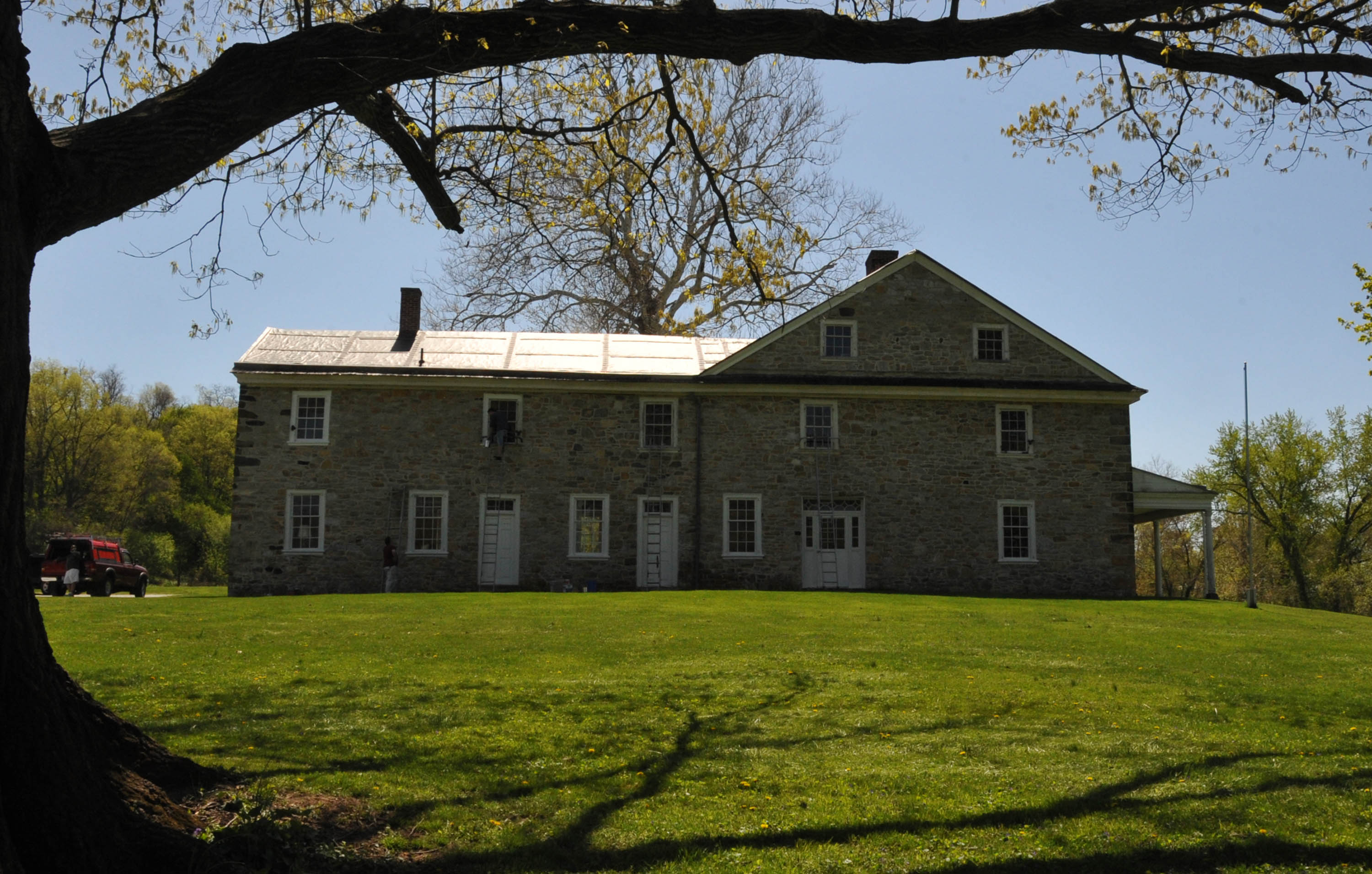

- Location within Pennsylvania Location within the United States
- Location: South of Bainbridge off Pennsylvania Route 441, Conoy Township, Pennsylvania
- Coordinates: 40°4′44″N 76°39′38″W
- Area: 2.6 acres (1.1 ha)
- Built: c. 1782
- NRHP reference No.: 77001171
- Added to NRHP: August 3, 1977

Locust Grove, also known as the Haldeman Mansion, is an historic home that is located in Conoy Township in Lancaster County, Pennsylvania.

It was listed on the National Register of Historic Places in 1977.

== History and architectural features ==
Built circa 1782, this historic structure is a large, two-story, four-bay by two-bay, stone dwelling that overlooks the Susquehanna River. It has a large central chimney. Also located on the property is a rectangular, two-story stone building with a hipped gable roof.
