= Conoy Township, Pennsylvania =

Township in Pennsylvania, US

Coordinates: 40°08′00″N 76°40′59″W

- Township
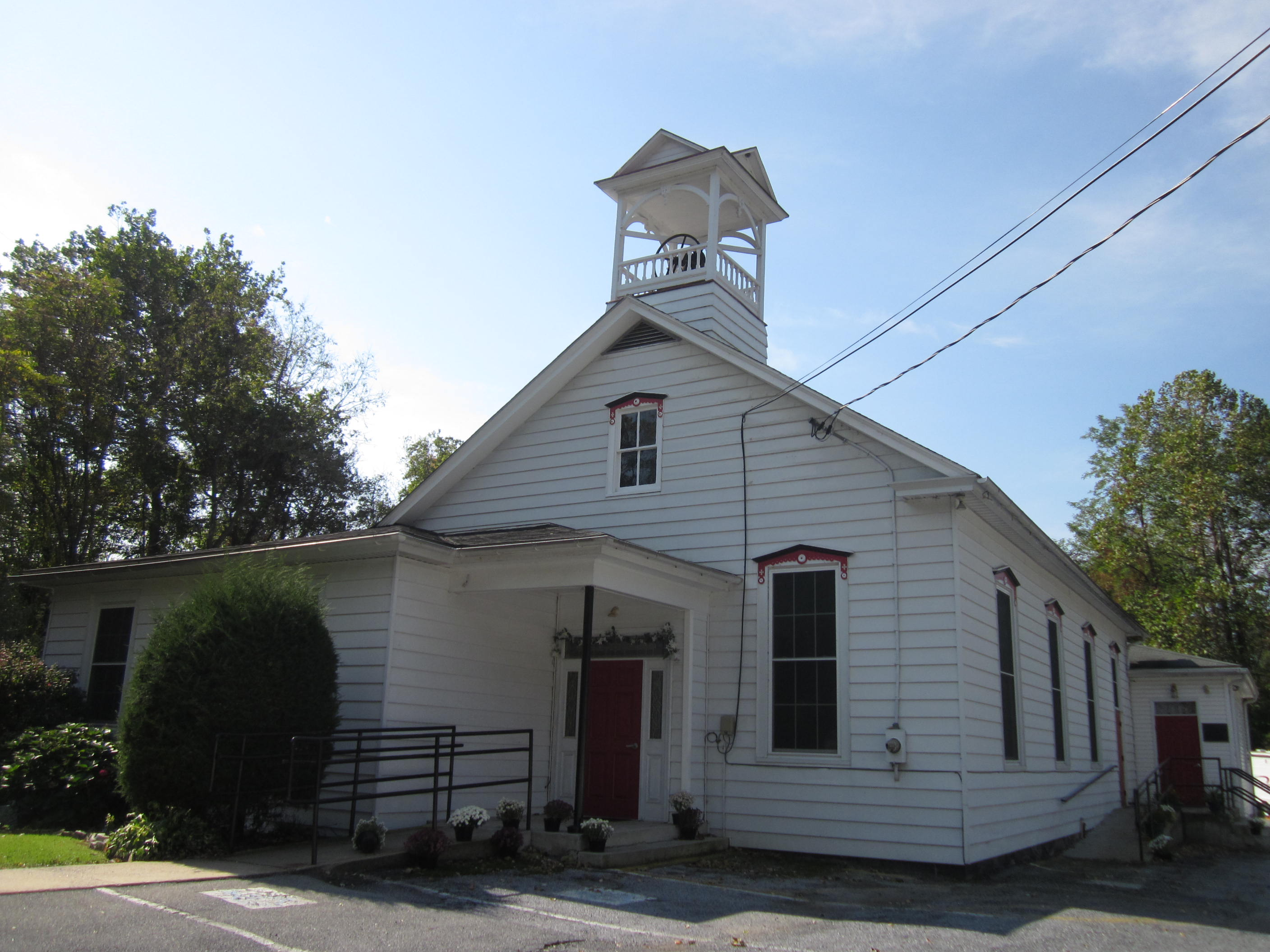
- Falmouth is a village in the township.

- Seal

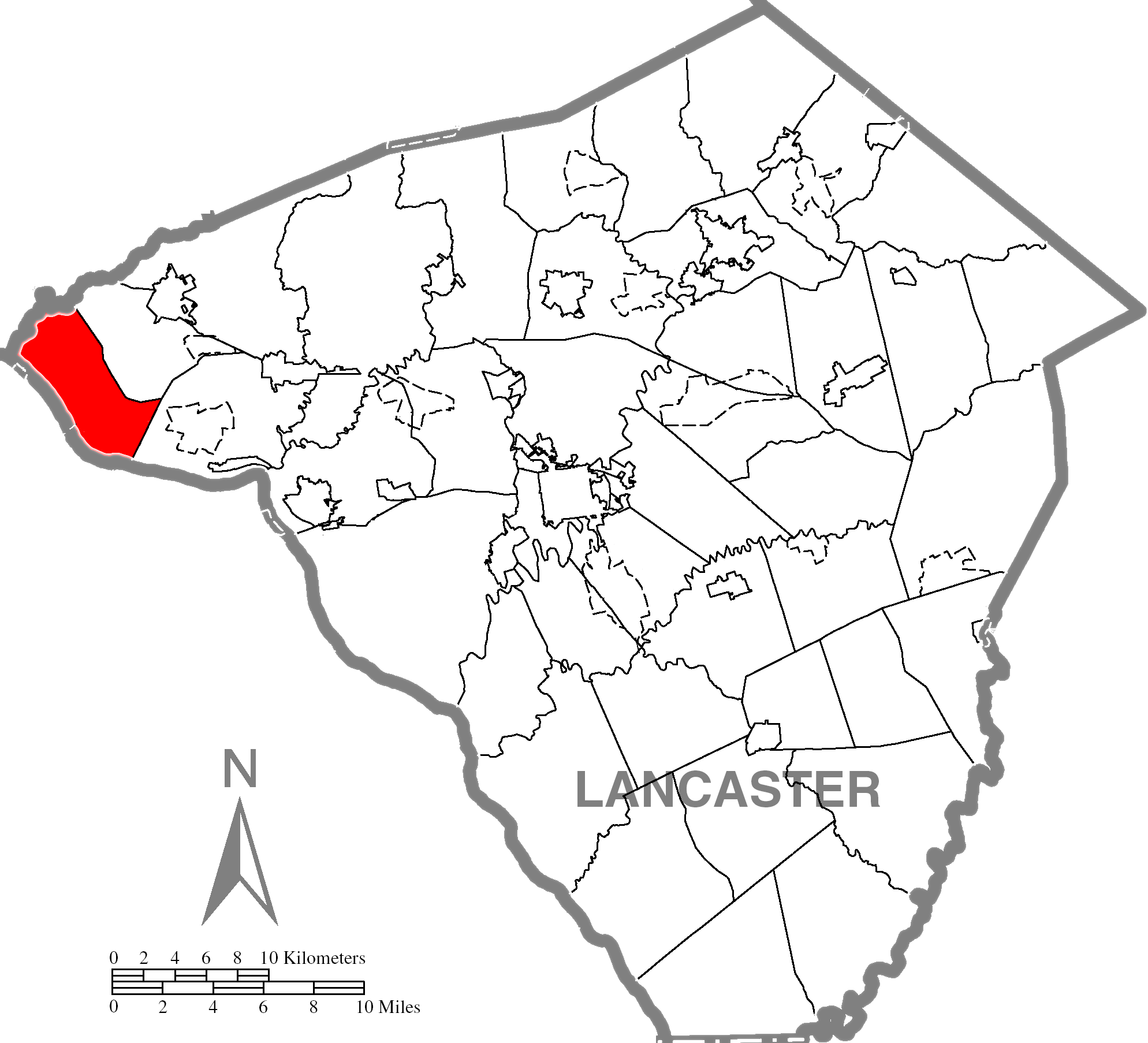
- Map of Lancaster County, Pennsylvania highlighting Conoy Township

- Map of Lancaster County, Pennsylvania
- Country: United States
- State: Pennsylvania
- County: Lancaster
- Settled: 1719
- Incorporated: 1842

Government
  - Type: Board of Supervisors

Area
  - Total: 18.45 sq mi (47.78 km^{2})
  - Land: 14.56 sq mi (37.70 km^{2})
  - Water: 3.89 sq mi (10.08 km^{2})

Population (2020)
  - Total: 3,373 ▲
  - Estimate (2021): 3,353
  - Density: 236.4/sq mi (91.28/km^{2})
- Time zone: UTC-5 (Eastern (EST))
  - Summer (DST): UTC-4 (EDT)
- Area code: 717
- FIPS code: 42-071-15824
- Website: conoytownship.org

Conoy Township is a township in northwestern Lancaster County, Pennsylvania, United States. At the 2020 census, the population was 3,373.

== History ==
Conoy Township was formed in 1842 from West Donegal Township. Conoy is an Indian name. An early settler was the French-Canadian fur trader Peter Bisaillon, who was granted 700 acres near Conoy Creek in 1719.

Locust Grove was listed on the National Register of Historic Places in 1977.

== Geography ==
According to the U.S. Census Bureau, the township has a total area of 18.6 square miles (48 km^{2}), of which 14.8 square miles (38 km^{2}) is land and 3.7 square miles (9.6 km^{2}) (20.04%) is water. It includes the communities of Falmouth, Bainbridge, Stackstown, Sagerville, Locust Grove, and Billmeyer.

== Demographics ==
Historical population
Census	Pop.	Note	%±
1980	2,309		—
1990	2,687		16.4%
2000	3,067		14.1%
2010	3,194		4.1%
2020	3,373		5.6%
2021 (est.)	3,353		−0.6%
U.S. Decennial Census

As of the census of 2000, there were 3,067 people, 1,103 households, and 873 families living in the township. The population density was 206.6 inhabitants per square mile (79.8/km^{2}). There were 1,130 housing units at an average density of 76.1 units per square mile (29.4 units/km^{2}). The racial makeup of the township was 98.96% White, 0.03% Black or African American, 0.13% Native American, 0.16% Asian, 0.03% Pacific Islander, 0.29% from other races, and 0.39% from two or more races. 0.85% of the population were Hispanic or Latino of any race.

There were 1,103 households, out of which 39.5% had children under the age of 18 living with them, 68.0% were married couples living together, 6.6% had a female householder with no husband present, and 20.8% were non-families. 17.6% of all households were made up of individuals, and 5.4% had someone living alone who was 65 years of age or older. The average household size was 2.78 and the average family size was 3.14.

In the township the population was spread out, with 28.3% under the age of 18, 6.6% from 18 to 24, 33.6% from 25 to 44, 22.6% from 45 to 64, and 8.9% who were 65 years of age or older. The median age was 37 years. For every 100 females, there were 104.2 males. For every 100 females age 18 and over, there were 102.7 males.

The median income for a household in the township was $48,775, and the median income for a family was $56,632. Males had a median income of $36,849 versus $26,406 for females. The per capita income for the township was $20,157. About 3.0% of families and 3.7% of the population were below the poverty line, including 6.0% of those under age 18 and 7.1% of those age 65 or over.

== Education ==
Public education is run by the Elizabethtown Area School District; the only public school in the township is Bainbridge Elementary School, which serves kindergarten through second grade.
