= Samuel Haldeman =

American naturalist and philologist (1812–1880)

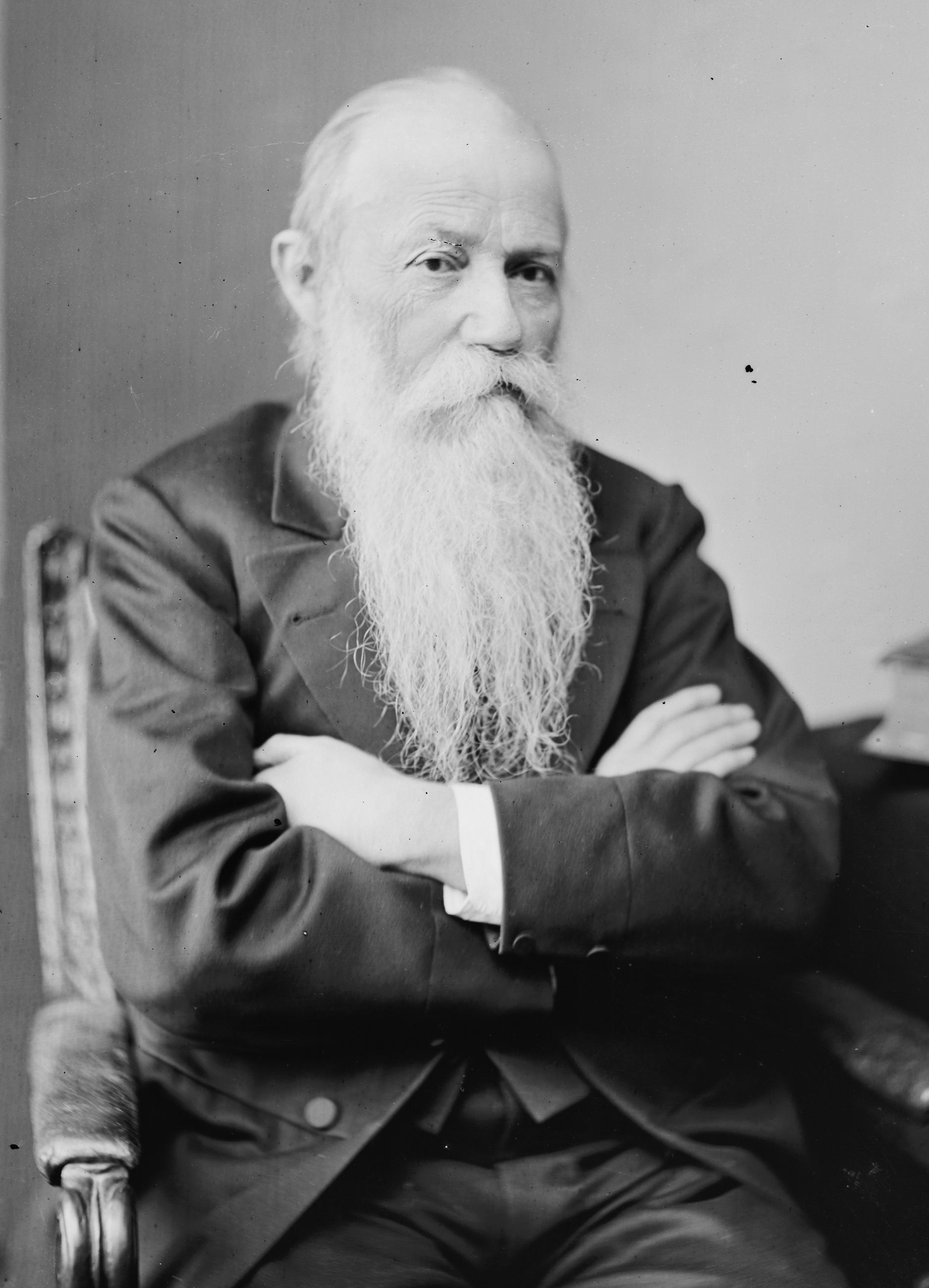

Samuel Stehman Haldeman (August 12, 1812 – September 10, 1880) was an American naturalist and philologist. During a long and varied career he studied, published, and lectured on geology, conchology, entomology and philology. He once confided, "I never pursue one branch of science more than ten years, but lay it aside and go into new fields."

== Early life and education ==
Haldeman was born in Locust Grove, Pennsylvania on August 12, 1812, the oldest of seven children of Henry Haldeman and Frances Stehman Haldeman. Locust Grove was the family estate on the Susquehanna River, twenty miles below Harrisburg. His father was a prosperous businessman and his mother was an accomplished musician who died when Haldeman was twelve years old. In 1826, he was sent to Harrisburg to attend school at the Classical Academy, run by John M. Keagy. After two years in the academy, he enrolled at Dickinson College where his interest in natural history was encouraged by his professor, Henry Darwin Rogers, who would later become a distinguished geologist. Two years after entering Dickinson, the college was forced to close temporarily and Peck left without earning a diploma.

== Career ==
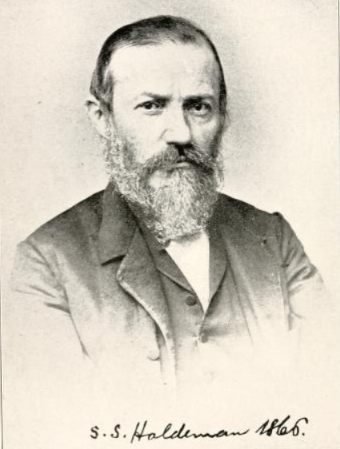
Haldeman

After leaving school, Haldeman took over management of his father's new sawmill and became a silent partner with two of his brothers who started an iron manufacturing business in the area. He eventually became an authority on smelting iron. However, he was always drawn to science and often neglected the family businesses in pursuit of these interests. He later said, "I developed a taste for rainy weather and impassable roads; then I could remain undisturbed in the perusal of my books." In 1833–1834, he attended lectures in the medical department at the University of Pennsylvania in Philadelphia in order to better prepare himself for the study of natural history.

In 1835, Haldeman wrote an article for the Lancaster Journal refuting the Great Moon Hoax, a sensational story claiming that life had been observed on the moon. That same year his former professor, Henry D. Rogers, was appointed state geologist of New Jersey and in 1836 he sent for Haldeman to assist him. A year later, on the reorganization of the Pennsylvania geological survey, Haldeman transferred there, and was actively engaged on the survey until 1842, preparing five annual reports, and personally surveying Dauphin and Lancaster counties.

During the 1840s, Haldeman's interests were focused on the natural history of invertebrates, especially the taxonomy of beetles and freshwater mollusks. In 1840 he began the publication of his Monograph of the Freshwater Univalve Mollusca of the United States, issued in nine parts with the final volume not appearing until 1866. The monograph was well received by the scientific community in America and Europe. In an addendum he described Scolithus linearis, a trace fossil of some burrowing organism, the most ancient organic remains known at the time. In 1844 he wrote a paper, "Enumeration of the Recent Freshwater Mollusca Which are Common to North America and Europe", where he laid out in detail the case for Lamarckian evolution and transmutation of species. In 1861, Charles Darwin wrote in a preface to his On the Origin of Species an acknowledgment of Haldeman's ideas in support of evolution.

He was elected as a member to the American Philosophical Society in 1844.

In 1842, he was instrumental in the establishment of the Entomological Society of Pennsylvania, the first scientific society formed to study insects in America. Haldeman's participation in the society put him in regular contact with other leading American entomologists including Frederick E. Melsheimer and John G. Morris. His first entomological paper was the "Catalogue of the Carabideous Coleoptera of South Eastern Pennsylvania," published in 1842. Over the next 15 years he published many papers on the systematics of beetles and other insects, describing many new species. His ear was remarkably sensitive, and he discovered a new organ of sound in lepidopterous insects, which was described by him in Benjamin Silliman's American Journal of Science in 1848. In 1852 he wrote a description of the insects collected by the Stansbury survey of the Great Salt Lake.

In addition to his work on entomology, Haldeman accepted various college appointments to teach natural history. In 1842, he was a professor of zoology at the Franklin Institute in Philadelphia. From 1851 until 1855 he was professor of natural history at the University of Pennsylvania. He then accepted a similar professorship in Delaware College. Meanwhile, he also lectured on geology and chemistry at the State Agricultural College of Pennsylvania. He visited Texas in 1851 to investigate the presidency of an institution there, but declined the position. On his return trip from Texas, he was offered the position of president of Masonic College in Selma, Alabama, which he accepted and held from January to October 1852.

In the 1850s, Haldeman's focus turned to the study of language. He carried out extensive research among Amerindian dialects, and also in Pennsylvania Dutch, besides investigations in the English, Chinese, and other languages. Haldeman was an earnest advocate of spelling reform. He was a member of many scientific societies, was the founder and president of the American Philological Association, and one of the early members of the National Academy of Sciences. In 1858, Haldeman was awarded the Trevelyan Prize, given by the Phonetic Society of Great Britain, for his article entitled "Analytic Orthography". He made numerous visits to Europe for purposes of research, and when studying the human voice in Rome determined the vocal repertoire of 40–50 varieties of human speech. In 1869, he returned to the University of Pennsylvania as a professor of comparative philology and remained there until his death in 1880.

In 1835, Haldeman married Mary A. Hough and the couple had two sons and two daughters. After the wedding, they moved to a new home at the base of Chickies Rock. He had designed the house and laid out the extensive gardens with native specimens of trees and shrubs. Raised a Protestant, Haldeman converted to Catholicism in the 1840s after undertaking a systematic study of different religions. He died suddenly of a heart attack on September 10, 1880 at his home in Chickies, Pennsylvania.

== Works ==
He was the author of some 150 publications including important works on entomology, conchology, and philology.

- A monograph of the Limniades and other freshwater univalve shells of North America. Philadelphia, J. Dobson. (1840)
- A monograph of the freshwater univalve mollusca of the United States, including notices of species in other parts of North America (1842)
- Zoological Contributions, Parts 1,2,3 (1842–1844)
- "Enumeration of the Recent Freshwater Mollusk Which are Common to North America and Europe, with Observations on Species and their Distribution" (1844)
- "Monographie du genre leptoxis" (in Chenu's Illustrations conchologiques, Paris, 1847)
- "On some Points in Linguistic Ethnology" (in Proceedings of the American Academy, Boston, 1849)
- "Zoölogy of the Invertebrate Animals" (in the Iconographic Encyclopædia, New York, 1850)
- Elements of Latin Pronunciation. (1851)
- "On the Relations of the English and Chinese Languages" (in Proceedings of the American Association for the Advancement of Science, 1856)
- Analytic Orthography (1860) In 1858, this essay gained Haldeman the Trevelyan Prize in England over 18 European competitors.
- Tours of a Chess Knight (1864)
- Pennsylvania Dutch, a Dialect of South German with an Infusion of English (1872)
- Outlines of Etymology (1877)
- Word-Building (1881)

== Notes ==
Attribution

- Ripley, George; Dana, Charles A., eds. (1879). "Haldeman, S. Stehman" . The American Cyclopædia.
