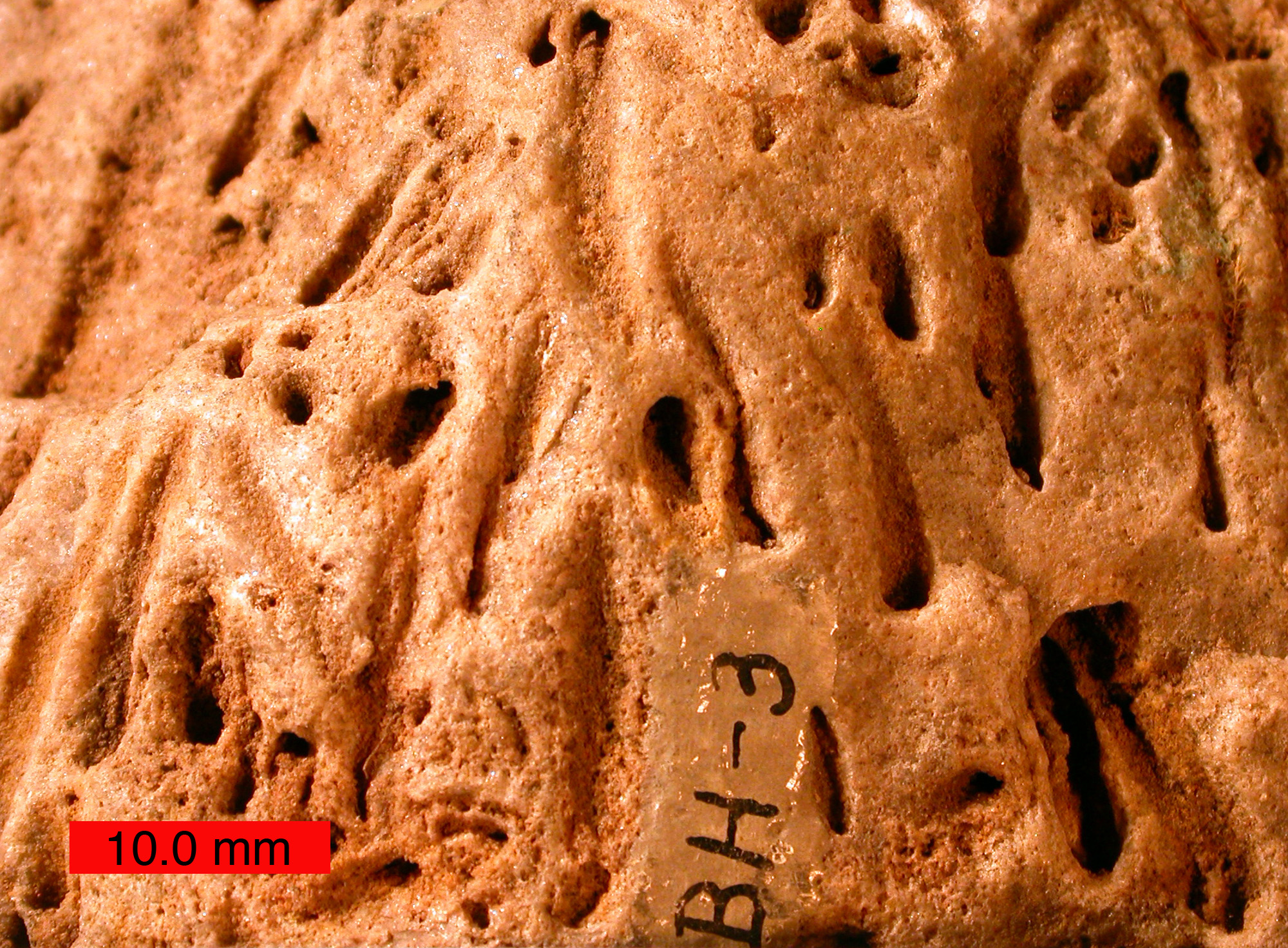
- Skolithos trace fossils. Scale bar is 10 mm.

Trace fossil classification
- Ichnogenus: Skolithos; Haldeman, 1840

Type ichnospecies
- Skolithos linearis Haldeman, 1840

= Skolithos =

Skolithos Temporal range: Early Cambrian–Present

Trace fossil

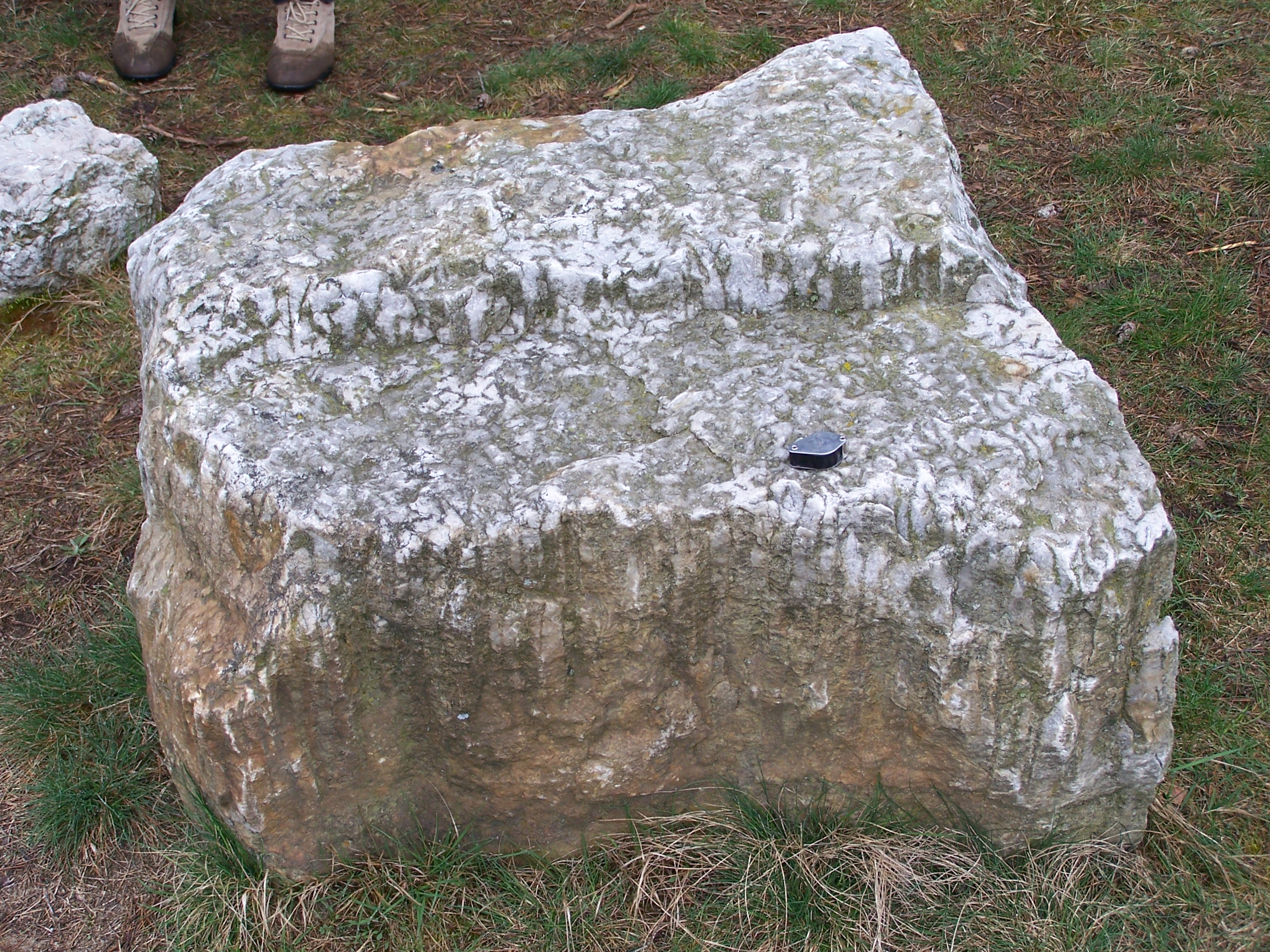
Skolithos from Kraków am See, Germany.

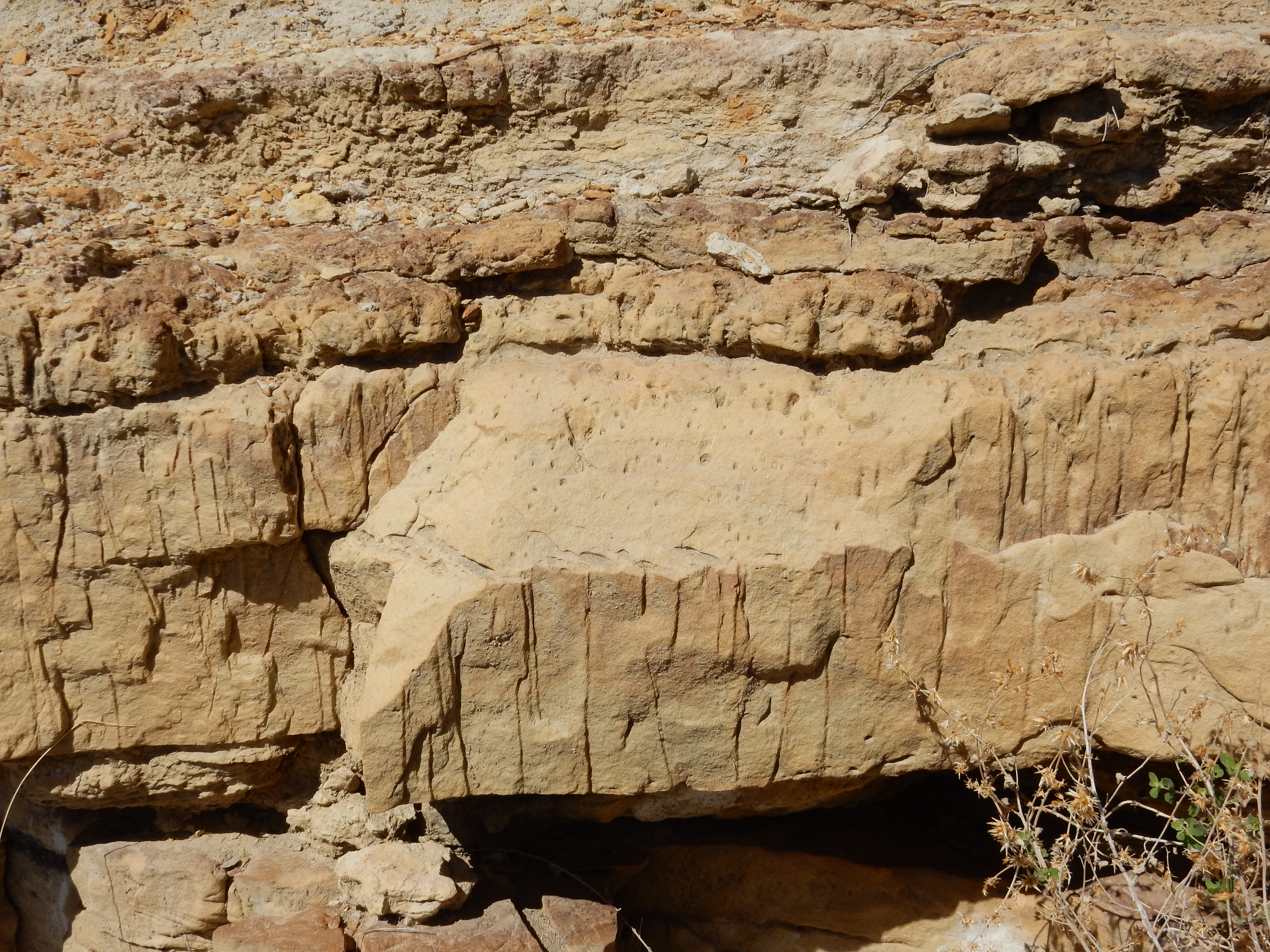
Skolithos in a bed of the Dakota Formation, New Mexico, US

Skolithos (formerly spelled Scolithus or Skolithus) is a common trace fossil ichnogenus that is, or was originally, an approximately vertical cylindrical burrow with a distinct lining. It was produced globally by a variety of organisms, mostly in shallow marine environments, and appears as linear features in sedimentary rocks.

== Depositional environments ==
Skolithos ranges in age from early Cambrian to the present and is found throughout the world. They occur in sediments and sedimentary rocks, primarily sands and sandstones. They are typically marine in origin, and are commonly associated with high-energy environments close to the shoreline. They have also been reported from freshwater lacustrine settings, but have rarely been described from carbonate rocks. Vertical Skolithos can also occur in alluvial sediments such as braided river deposits, where the periodic fluctuation of water is an important factor in the formation of this structure. This periodic water fluctuation corresponds to tidal activity in shallow marine environments, but also occurs over longer time intervals in alluvial deposits.

== Classification and history ==
The ichnogenus Skolithos was first described as a subgenus of the supposed seaweed Fucoides in 1840, by Samuel Stehman Haldeman, a renowned Pennsylvania naturalist in the early 19th century, who labeled the structure as the “oldest fossil in the state”. He named the trace fossil Skolithos, meaning “worm-stone”, suggesting its morphologic similarity to a worm. James Hall published the first illustrations of Haldeman’s discovery in his journal Paleontology of New York Volume I (1847), changing the name to Scolithus. 1943 marked the revival of Haldeman’s research as Benjamin Howell reported the occurrence of the trace fossil in the Hardyston Formation in Pennsylvania. Howell restored the name Skolithos in accordance with the International Code of Zoological Nomenclature. In the 1960s structural geologists discovered the use of the trace fossil as a strain marker by which it could record rotation and strain in highly deformed rocks. This led to a series of experiments that extend to present-day analyses to determine the extent of the strain marking properties of Skolithos. Skolithos linearis, found in the Blue Ridge Mountain region, is the oldest known trace fossil in Virginia. Trypanites is superficially similar in form but is a boring excavated in hard substrates, and lacks the diagnostic lining of Skolithos.

== Structure and use as a strain marker ==
=== Skolithos structure ===
The structure of the trace fossil is cylindrical and elongated in shape, usually at a perpendicular angle to the surface where it has been deposited. They can reach lengths of up to about 35 cm (14 in) and diameters of up to about 5 cm (2.0 in). The vertical burrows are composed of the same mineralogy as its surrounding matrix which allow it to deform homogenously with the parent rock. Variations in observed Skolithos structures include burrow curvature, angle to the plane of deposition, and size of the fossil’s aperture. Funnel-shaped apertures of Skolithos reflect the filter- and suspension-feeding habits of burrowing genera. The high intensity of bioturbation of these organisms indicate the shallow water paleoenvironment in which the Skolithos burrows formed shortly after the deposition of the bed.

=== Using Skolithos to evaluate strain ===
Unstrained Skolithos structures are normal to the plane of the bed. In zones where tectonic deformation is intense, such as thrust zones, the deformed Skolithos burrow can be used to evaluate the local strain on the region. This technique is performed by comparing the angle between the specimen and the bedding surface, with the original 90^{o} geometric relationship. Since the trace fossil shares similar material properties to the surrounding matrix, they are inferred to deform by the same mechanism. This technique can be applied in areas where other strain markers may have been destroyed by tectonic activity or cataclastic flow.

Unit strain ɛ can also be defined using the elongation of the structure:

$\varepsilon= (\ell-\ell \circ)\div \ell\circ$

where

• ɛ is the unit strain due to elongation

• l is the deformed length of the structure

• l_{o} is the initial length of the structure

The structure length and orientation may be influenced by the directional behaviour of the burrowing organism, therefore observing the widths of the burrow may provide a more precise strain estimation.

=== Example of strain analysis using Skolithos ===
The famous "Pipe Rock" of northwest Scotland is a well-known example of Skolithos. The 'pipes' that give the rock its name are closely packed straight Skolithos tubes that were presumably made by a worm-like organism. The Pipe Rock can be found in the Stack of Glencoul region beneath the Moine Thrust Belt, Scotland. This area which has a history of thrust faulting activity is a highly deformed mylonite zone with a quartzite protolith where many structural geologists have used microstructures such as the Skolithos borings in conjunction with other strain markers, such as quartz vein recrystallization, in order to approximate strain in the region. Using three-dimensional analysis of the strain markers, geologists inferred flattening of the region parallel to the thrust direction, stretching along the vertical strain direction and shortening perpendicular to the foliation of the lithology. The deformation history of the mylonite belt which is characterized by large translation of thrust faults, can be deduced from the apparent clockwise rotation of these structures. Assuming simple shear, the westward displacement of the 800 m thick Moine Thrust mylonites at Loch Eriboll where the average shear strain determined using the trace fossils is approximately 10, was calculated to be about 8 km.

=== Criticisms and sources of error ===
Assumptions regarding the undeformed burrow and its geometric relationship cannot directly be determined, and only estimated. While it is common for Skolithos burrows to form normal to the deposition plane, this is not always true, in which case, the ideal, undeformed state can no longer be used as a reference orientation. Shallow depositional sediments are also susceptible to damage by erosion and tectonic stress forces, which can influence average measurements and geometric orientations. Since the rheological properties between the structure and the host rock are usually very similar, observations of the fossils are conducted with the assumption that they have deformed homogeneously, where the deformation forces are distributed evenly along the entire deformation zone. This is directly contradicted by the presence of folding and varying elongation measurements of the fossil at different locations in the same deformation zone. Deformation mechanisms are difficult to distinguish using this strain marker, as the thinning and flattening of the highly deformed rocks where they are found, cannot necessarily be attributed to pure shear since the planes may have simply rotated near parallel to the shear plane. It is therefore only possible to make accurate strain determinations of the host rock provided the correct assumption of the deformation mechanism and original measurements.
