= Falmouth, Pennsylvania =

Unincorporated community in Pennsylvania, US

- Census-designated place
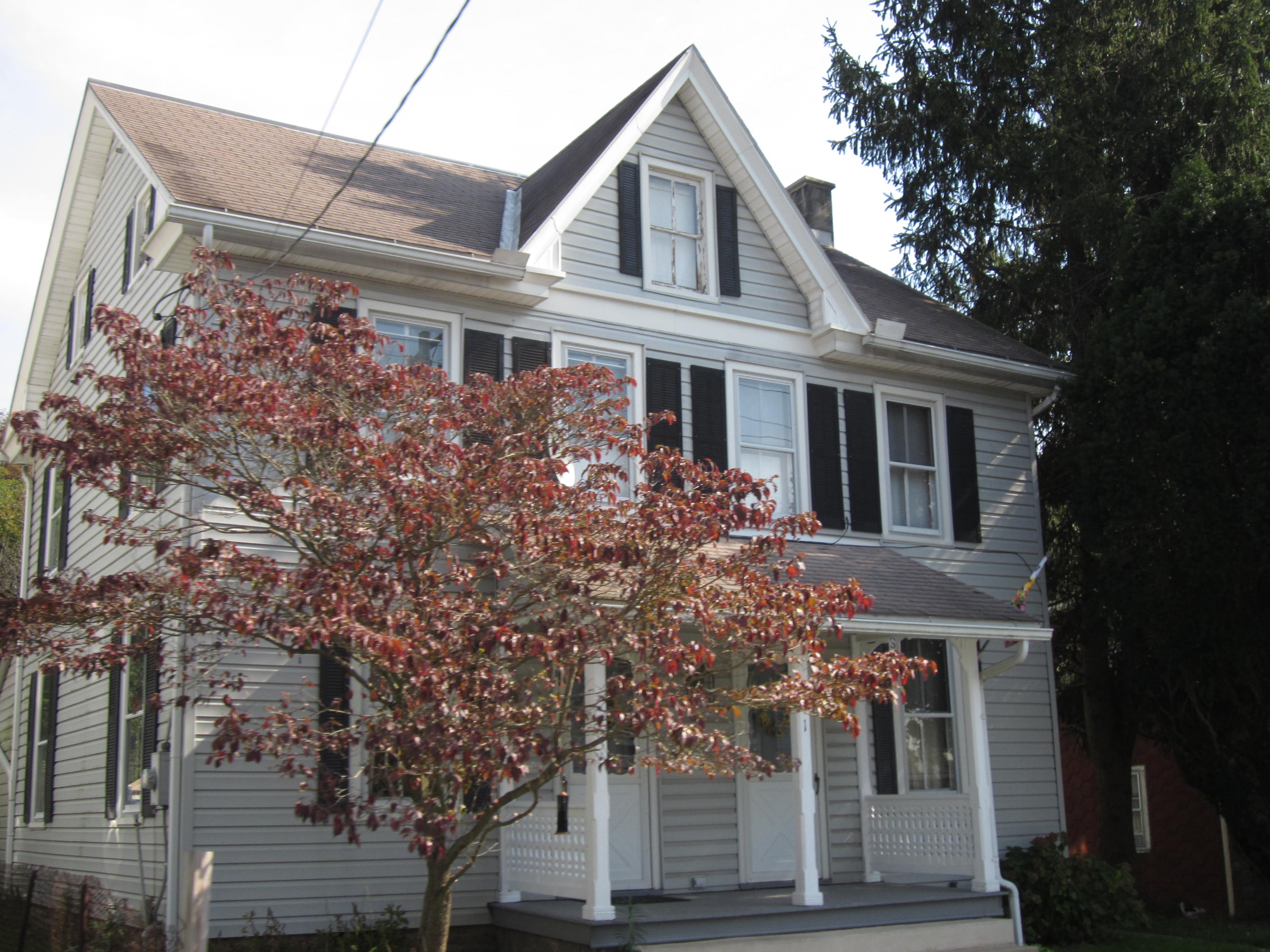

- Location in Pennsylvania Location in the United States
- Coordinates: 40°07′46″N 76°42′50″W
- Country: United States
- State: Pennsylvania
- County: Lancaster
- Township: Conoy

Area
  - Total: 0.99 sq mi (2.56 km^{2})
  - Land: 0.98 sq mi (2.55 km^{2})
  - Water: 0 sq mi (0.00 km^{2})
- Elevation: 360 ft (110 m)

Population (2020)
  - Total: 397
  - Density: 402.6/sq mi (155.45/km^{2})
- Time zone: UTC-5 (Eastern (EST))
  - Summer (DST): UTC-4 (EDT)
- FIPS code: 42-25168
- GNIS feature ID: 1174610

Falmouth is an unincorporated community and census-designated place (CDP) in Conoy Township, Lancaster County, Pennsylvania, United States. As of the 2010 census the population was 420, but the 2020 census shows that the population has decreased to 397.

== Geography ==
Falmouth is in the northwestern corner of Lancaster County, at the confluence of Conewago Creek with the Susquehanna River. It is bordered to the northwest, across Conewago Creek, by Londonderry Township in Dauphin County. To the southwest, across the Susquehanna River, is the borough of York Haven in York County. Falmouth is 2 miles (3 km) south of the closed Three Mile Island Nuclear Generating Station.

Pennsylvania Route 441 (River Road) passes through Falmouth, leading north (up the Susquehanna) 5 miles (8 km) to Middletown and southeast (downriver) 4 miles (6 km) to Bainbridge and 14 miles (23 km) to Columbia. Lancaster, the county seat, is 25 miles (40 km) southeast of Falmouth.

According to the U.S. Census Bureau, the Falmouth CDP has a total area of 1.0 square mile (2.6 km^{2}), of which 0.4 acres (1,599 m^{2}), or 0.06%, is water.

== Demographics ==
Historical population
Census	Pop.	Note	%±
2020	397		—
U.S. Decennial Census
