= Chickies Ridge =

Ridge in Lancaster County, Pennsylvania, US

Chickies Rock
- View from on top of Chickies Rock looking out over the Susquehanna River.

Highest point
- Elevation: 525 ft (160 m)
- Coordinates: 40°03′04″N 76°31′31″W

Geography
- Location: Lancaster County, Pennsylvania, United States
- Parent range: Chickies Ridge
- Topo map: USGS Columbia West

Chickies Ridge is a long ridge in West Hempfield Township, Lancaster County, Pennsylvania, terminating at the west end in an outcropping overlooking the Susquehanna River, known as Chickies Rock.

== Geology ==
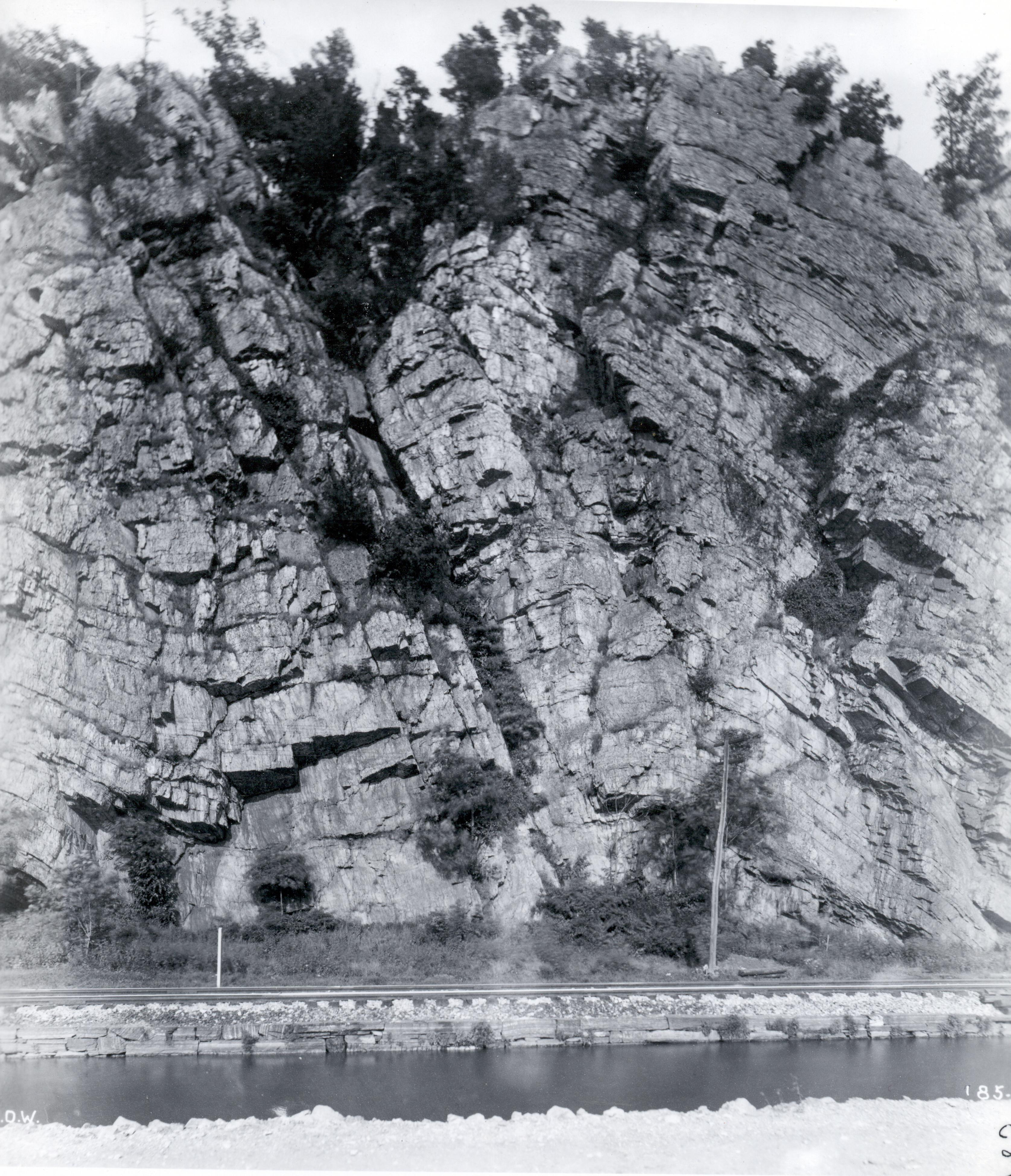
Chickies Rock (1892)

Part of an eastward extension of the Hellam Hills, Chickies Ridge has been separated from them by a water gap cut by the Susquehanna. The ridge is composed of uplifted Cambrian Chickies Formation, which extends several miles east before merging into the surrounding uplands. Chickies Rock, at the west end overlooking the river, is the largest exposed anticline on the East Coast. According to the USGS, the summit of the ridge is 587 feet (179 m) above sea level.

Chickies Creek runs along the north side of the ridge towards the western end, while Jones Run runs along the south side towards the western end.

== History ==
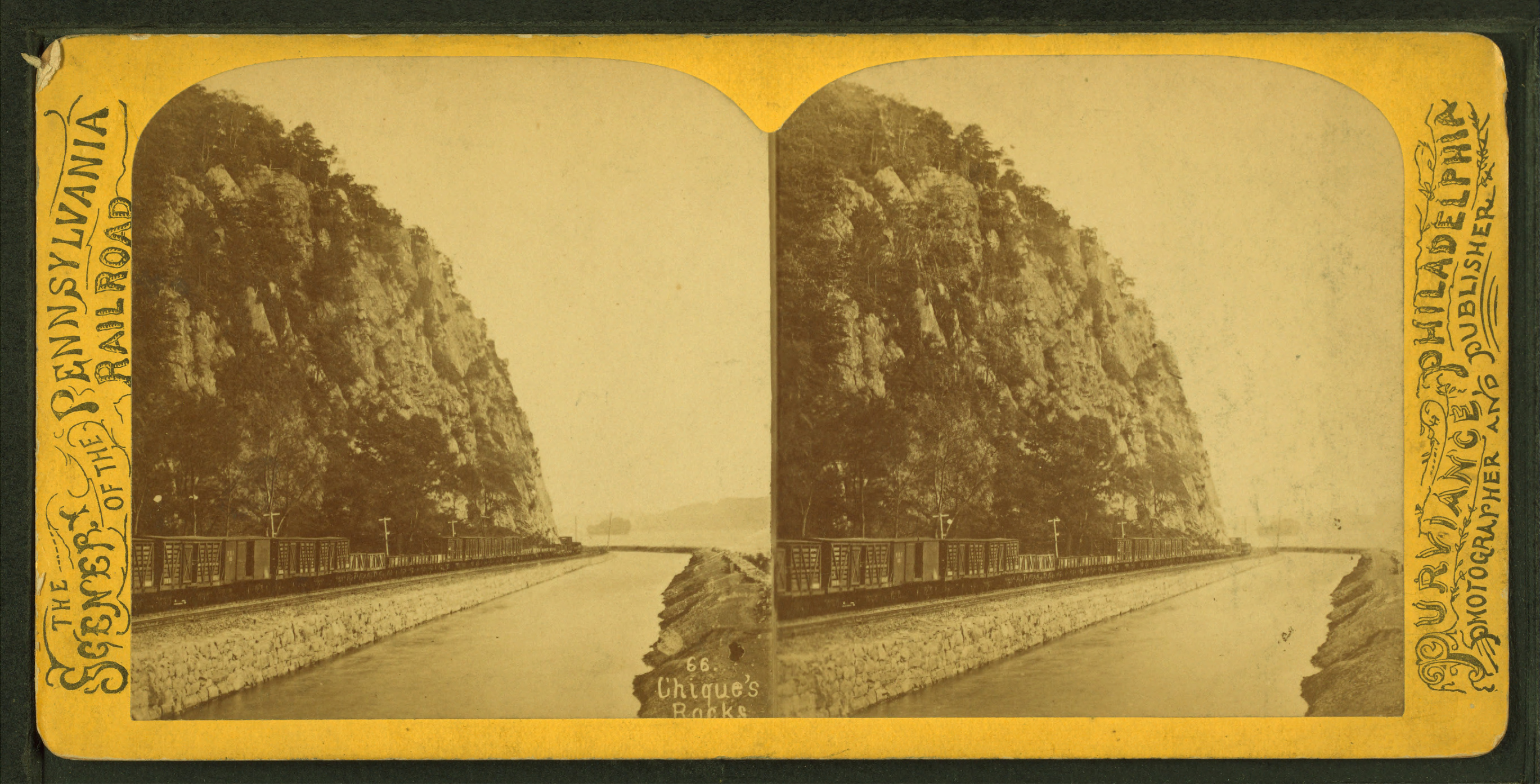
Pennsylvania Canal and Columbia Branch PRR at the base of Chickies Rocks

The name of the creek comes from the Lenape "Chiquesalunga", meaning "place of crayfish".

Chickies Hill Road appears to have been the earliest road over the ridge, switchbacking across the middle and making a steep descent down the northern side on the way from Columbia to Marietta.

During the Gettysburg campaign of the American Civil War, Chickies Rock served as a Union army observation post during the Confederate occupation of Wrightsville across the river.

The Columbia and Donegal Electric Railway built tracks up the side of the ridge from Columbia in 1893. The railway climbed a 6% grade, running on the west side of Chickies Hill Road and then curving sharply west to reach Chickies Park. This was an amusement park built by the trolley company on the west end of the ridge, atop Chickies Rock, overlooking the Susquehanna. The line to the park was opened on July 1, 1893. It was then extended down the north side of the ridge, running westward about 0.5 miles (0.80 km), rounding a tight horseshoe curve and turning eastward, to cross Chickies Creek at the base of the ridge and run to Marietta. This extension was opened on December 31, 1893. A trolley car descending the steep Chickies grade to Columbia lost its brakes and derailed resulting in six deaths (including the motorman) and 68 injuries on August 9, 1896. The trolley line was abandoned on April 25, 1932.

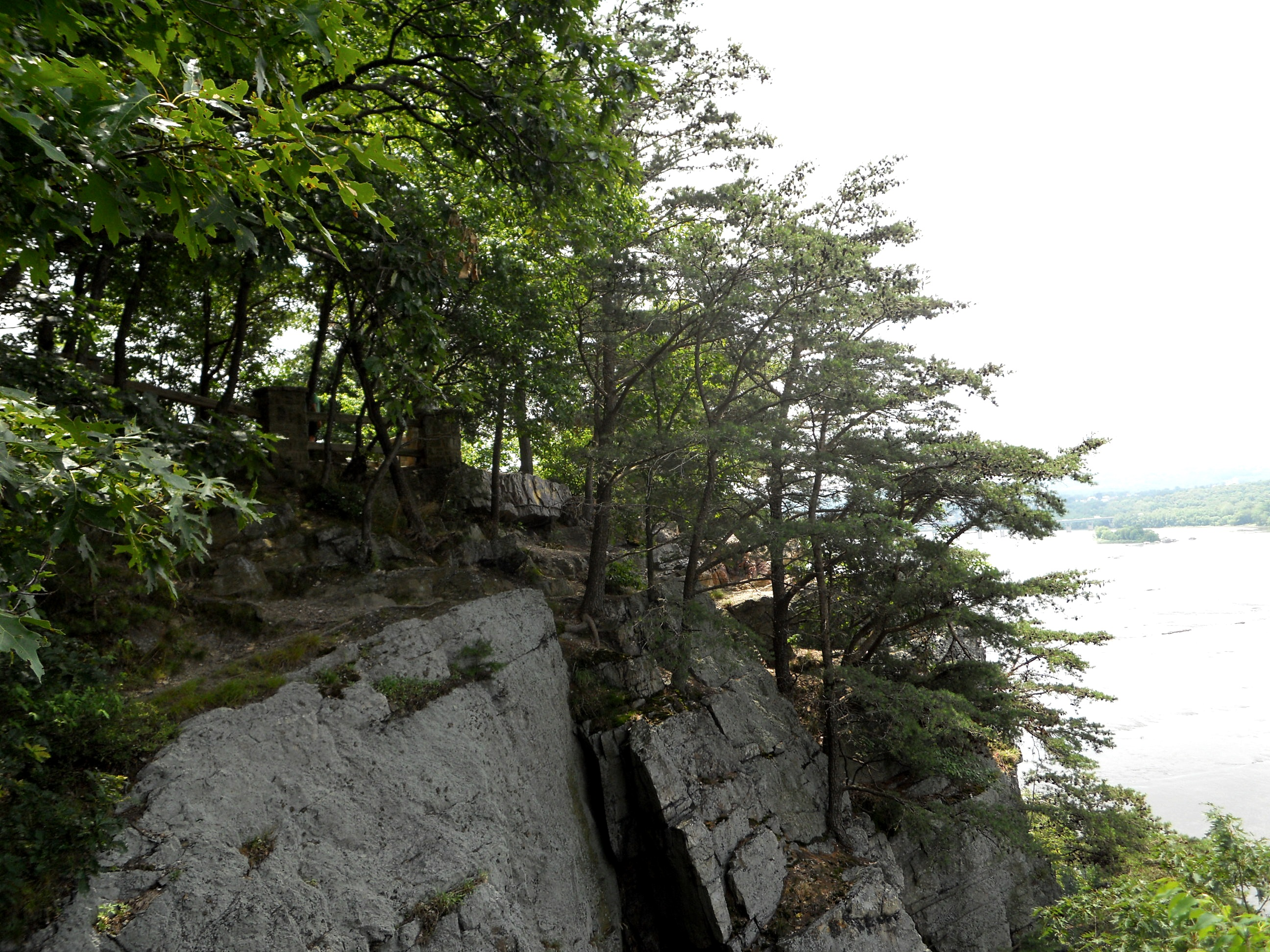
View of the cliffs at Chickies Rock, Lancaster County, Pennsylvania

Pennsylvania Route 441 once followed Chickies Hill Road, but a later realignment brought it directly through the western part of Chickies Ridge in a deep cut, substantially reducing the climb.

The Pennsylvania Canal, the Columbia Branch and then the Atglen and Susquehanna Branch of the Pennsylvania Railroad all at different times squeezed between Chickies Rock and the river. All but the last are now abandoned.

A variation of Shakespeare's Romeo and Juliet is told, with an Indian Maiden replacing Juliet and a white settler as Romeo. Eventually, the settler is killed in a war over the maiden, who throws herself off Chickies Rock.

== Trails and recreation ==
Chickies Rock is a popular venue for rock climbing. The ridge to the west of Chickies Hill Road is part of Chickies Rock Park, owned by Lancaster County. The Chickies Rock Overlook Trail leads from parking along Route 441 to the top of Chickies Rock, roughly following the old trolley grade. The Clayton Shenk trail crosses Jones Run and climbs up the south side of the ridge east of Route 441, dropping down the north side to Chickies Hill Road.

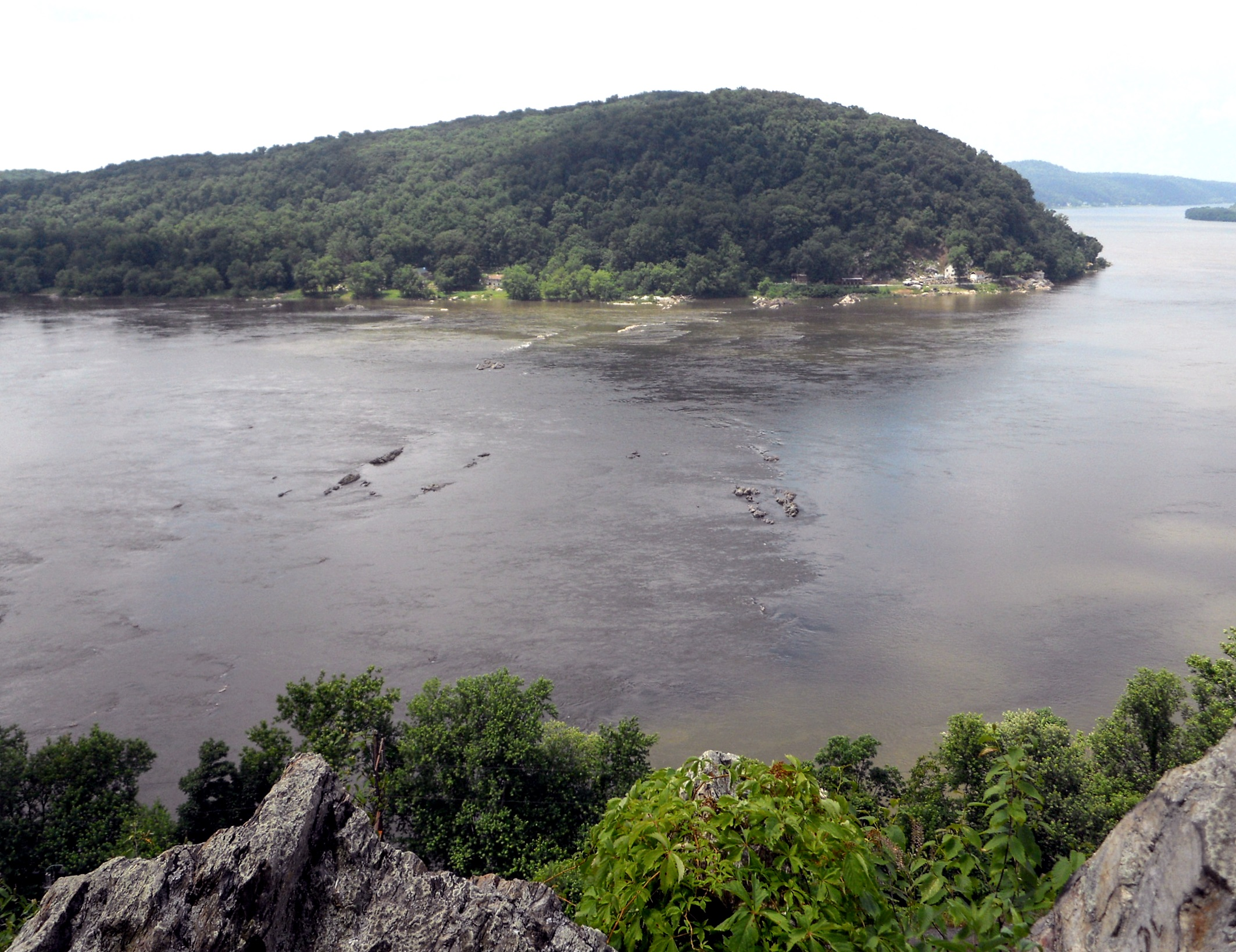
View of the water gap in the Susquehanna River between Chickies Rock (Lancaster County, Pennsylvania) and Hellam Ridge (York County, Pennsylvania). Note the in-place bedrock remnants in the river.

== Botany ==
Chickies Rock is a host site for one of the rarest of eastern U.S. ferns, Bradley's spleenwort.
