= Bainbridge, Pennsylvania =

Unincorporated community in Pennsylvania, US

- Census-designated place
- Location in Pennsylvania Location in the United States
- Coordinates: 40°05′27″N 76°40′03″W
- Country: United States
- State: Pennsylvania
- County: Lancaster
- Township: Conoy

Area
  - Total: 2.30 sq mi (5.96 km^{2})
  - Land: 2.28 sq mi (5.91 km^{2})
  - Water: 0.019 sq mi (0.05 km^{2})
- Elevation: 310 ft (94 m)

Population (2020)
  - Total: 1,536
  - Density: 673.6/sq mi (260.08/km^{2})
- Time zone: UTC-5 (Eastern (EST))
  - Summer (DST): UTC-4 (EDT)
- ZIP code: 17502
- Area codes: 717 and 223
- FIPS code: 42-03800
- GNIS feature ID: 1168585

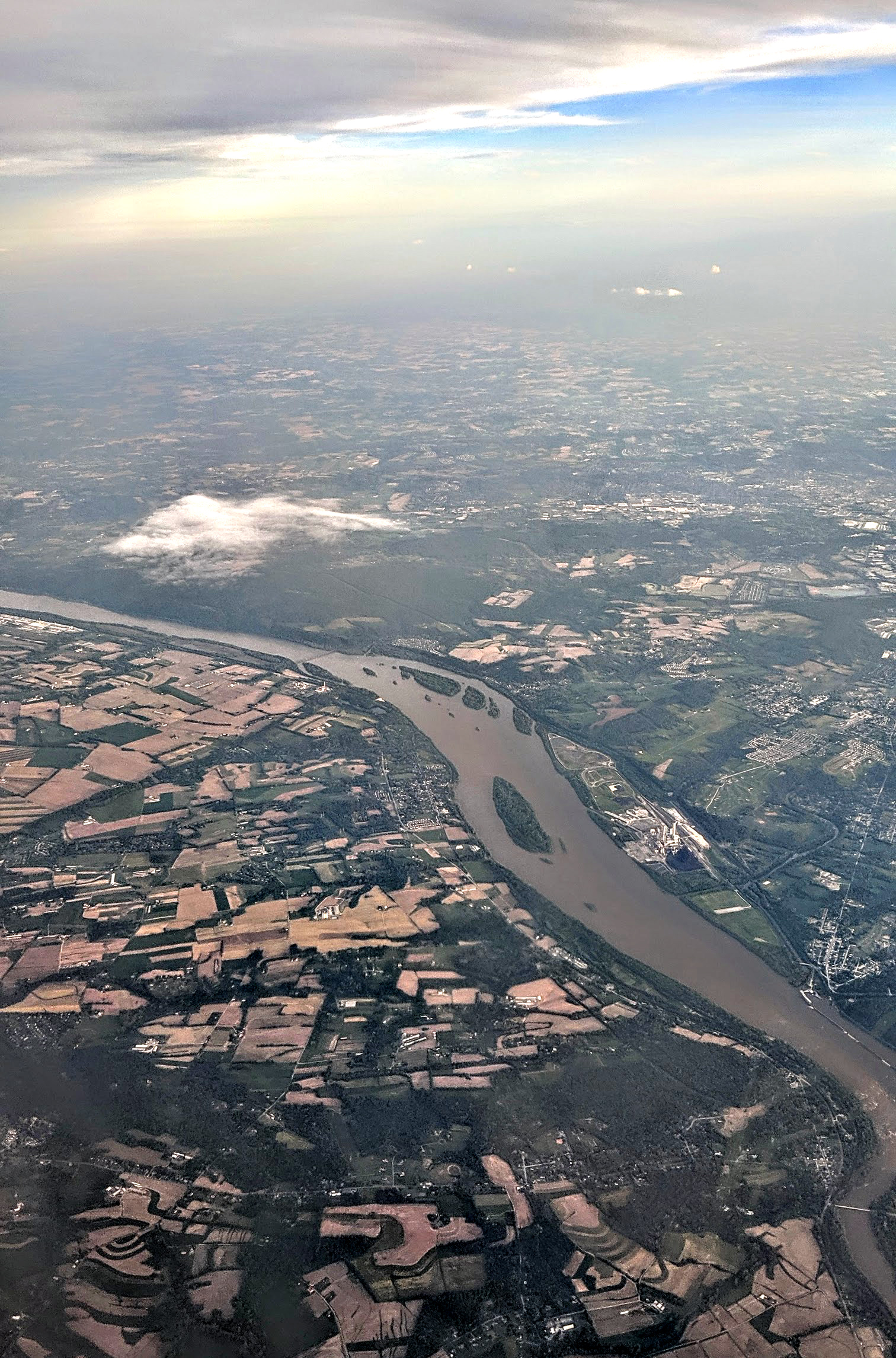
Aerial view from the north of the Susquehanna River at Bainbridge (on left bank), with the Brunner Island Steam Electric Station (on right bank island)

Bainbridge is an unincorporated community and census-designated place (CDP) in Conoy Township, Pennsylvania, United States, with a ZIP code of 17502. Bainbridge is located along Pennsylvania Route 441. As of the 2020 census, the population was 1,536.

Before European settlement, Bainbridge was the site of a Conoy village in the first decades of the 18th century, possibly called Conejoholo.

== History ==
Bainbridge became home to the Conoy and Nanticoke tribes in the early 1700s when English settlers pushed them out of their original homes. Before the move, the Conoys lived in the area that is now Baltimore, and the Nanticokes lived across the Chesapeake Bay in what is now Delaware. In 1632, there were about 2,500 among the tribes, and by 1697 there were only about 300, due to diseases brought to America by the English.

== Geography ==
Bainbridge is in western Lancaster County, in the southern part of Conoy Township. Pennsylvania Route 441 passes through the community northeast of the downtown, leading northwest (upstream along the Susquehanna River) 9 miles (14 km) to Middletown and southeast (downstream) 10 miles (16 km) to Columbia.

According to the U.S. Census Bureau, the Bainbridge CDP has a total area of 2.3 square miles (6.0 km^{2}), of which 0.02 square miles (0.05 km^{2}), or 0.85%, are water.

== Demographics ==
Historical population
Census	Pop.	Note	%±
2020	1,536		—
U.S. Decennial Census

== Tourism ==
=== White Cliffs ===
The White Cliffs of Conoy, south of Bainbridge, are open to the public. The cliffs look out over the Susquehanna River and are the direct result of a limestone quarry.

=== Koser Park ===
Koser Park is the starting point of a paved trail that stretches 15 miles (24 km) long. The trail goes through Marietta and Columbia.
