= Elizabethtown Area School District =

School district in Pennsylvania

Location
- United States

Students and staff
- District mascot: Bears
- Colors: Blue and white

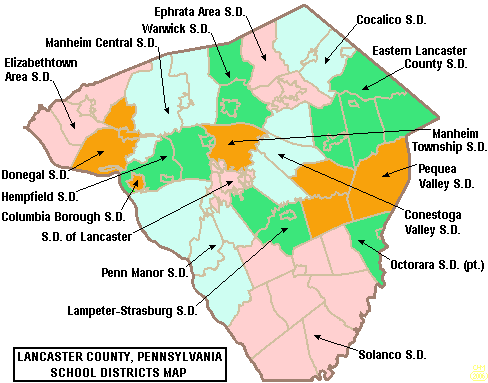
Map of Lancaster County, Pennsylvania public school districts. Elizabethtown Area School District is in pink in the northwest corner of the county.

The Elizabethtown Area School District is a school district in the Northwest corner of Lancaster County, Pennsylvania, United States that serves Elizabethown Borough and the townships of Conoy, and West Donegal, as well as the North and West part of Mount Joy Township. It is a member of Lancaster-Lebanon Intermediate Unit (IU) 13.

== Schools ==
Schools in the Elizabethtown Area School District include:

- Elizabethtown Area High School
- Elizabethtown Middle School
- Bear Creek Intermediate School
- Bainbridge Elementary
- East High Elementary
- Rheems Elementary (closed November 9, 2022)
- Mill Road Elementary (closed November 9, 2022)
- Fairview Elementary (closed end of 2010-2011 school year)

== National/state recognition ==
The school has won state championships in field hockey in 1974, and baseball in 1993. The district's Quiz Bowl Team was national runner up at the 2004 National Academic Championship.

In November 2015, Mill Road Elementary School was honored as a National Blue Ribbon School. In the same year, East High Elementary School was honored as a "High Achievement Reward School". In 2023, Elizabethtown Area High School was also honored as a National Blue Ribbon School.

== District profile ==
- As of the census of 2000
  - District population: 27,485 people
  - District area: 56.0 square miles (145 km^{2})
- School colors - Blue and white
- District mascot - Bear
- School nickname - "E-Town"
- Member of the Lancaster-Lebanon 2 Sports League

== Notable alumni ==
- Amanda Matta, TikTok personality, and political commentator
- Nelson Chittum, former MLB pitcher
- Gene Garber, former major league baseball pitcher with the Pittsburgh Pirates, Kansas City Royals, Philadelphia Phillies, and Atlanta Braves
