= Donegal West =

West Donegal or Donegal West may refer to:

- The Western part of County Donegal, in Ireland

Two parliamentary constituencies

- West Donegal (UK Parliament constituency), 1885–1922
- Donegal West (Dáil constituency), 1937–1961

In the United States

- West Donegal Township, Pennsylvania
