= Rheems, Pennsylvania =

Unincorporated community in Pennsylvania, US

- Census-designated place
- Location within Pennsylvania Location within the United States
- Coordinates: 40°7′49″N 76°34′13″W
- Country: United States
- State: Pennsylvania
- County: Lancaster
- Townships: West Donegal, Mount Joy

Area
  - Total: 1.43 sq mi (3.70 km^{2})
  - Land: 1.43 sq mi (3.70 km^{2})
  - Water: 0.0039 sq mi (0.01 km^{2})
- Elevation: 427 ft (130 m)

Population (2020)
  - Total: 2,253
  - Density: 1,578.4/sq mi (609.44/km^{2})
- Time zone: UTC-5 (Eastern (EST))
  - Summer (DST): UTC-4 (EDT)
- ZIP code: 17570
- FIPS code: 42-64392
- GNIS feature ID: 1184976

Rheems is an unincorporated community and census-designated place (CDP) in Lancaster County, Pennsylvania, United States, between the boroughs of Elizabethtown and Mount Joy. The population was 1,598 during the 2010 census.

== Geography ==
Rheems is located in western Lancaster County at 40°07′39″N 76°33′58″W. It is mainly in West Donegal, but with the portion on the north side of Harrisburg Avenue lying in Mount Joy Township. The center of Elizabethtown is 2.5 miles (4.0 km) northwest of Rheems, and the center of Mount Joy is 4 miles (6 km) to the southeast. Lancaster, the county seat, is 16 miles (26 km) southeast of Rheems.

According to the United States Census Bureau, the CDP has a total area of 1.2 square miles (3.1 km^{2}), of which 1.3 acres (5,432 m^{2}), or 0.18%, are water. Rheems is drained by the headwaters of Donegal Creek, which flows south to join Chiques Creek just before entering the Susquehanna River.

== Demographics ==
Historical population
| Census | Pop. | Note | %± |
|---|---|---|---|
| 2020 | 2,253 | | — |
U.S. Decennial Census

At the 2000 census there were 1,557 people, 513 households, and 439 families living in the CDP. The population density was 1,321.7 people per square mile (510.3 people/km^{2}). There were 521 housing units at an average density of 442.3 per square mile (170.8/km^{2}). The racial makeup of the CDP was 97.75% White, 0.26% African American, 0.13% Native American, 0.45% Asian, 0.13% Pacific Islander, 0.32% from other races, and 0.96% from two or more races. Hispanic or Latino of any race were 1.09%.

== Quarry ==
R.E. Pierson Materials of NJ recently has been experiencing controversy about the expansion of their quarry into thirty acres of Rheems farmland.

== Other ==
There were 513 households, 42.1% had children under the age of 18 living with them, 78.6% were married couples living together, 5.5% had a female householder with no husband present, and 14.4% were non-families. 10.7% of households were made up of individuals, and 3.5% were one person aged 65 or older. The average household size was 2.88 and the average family size was 3.10.

The age distribution was 26.5% under the age of 18, 6.7% from 18 to 24, 33.2% from 25 to 44, 20.9% from 45 to 64, and 12.8% 65 or older. The median age was 36 years. For every 100 females, there were 94.1 males. For every 100 females age 18 and over, there were 92.8 males.

The median household income was $55,170 and the median family income was $54,643. Males had a median income of $41,047 versus $26,683 for females. The per capita income for the CDP was $19,530. None of the families and 0.6% of the population were living below the poverty line, including no under eighteens and none of those over 64.
