= Kreider Shoe Manufacturing Company =

- U.S. National Register of Historic Places
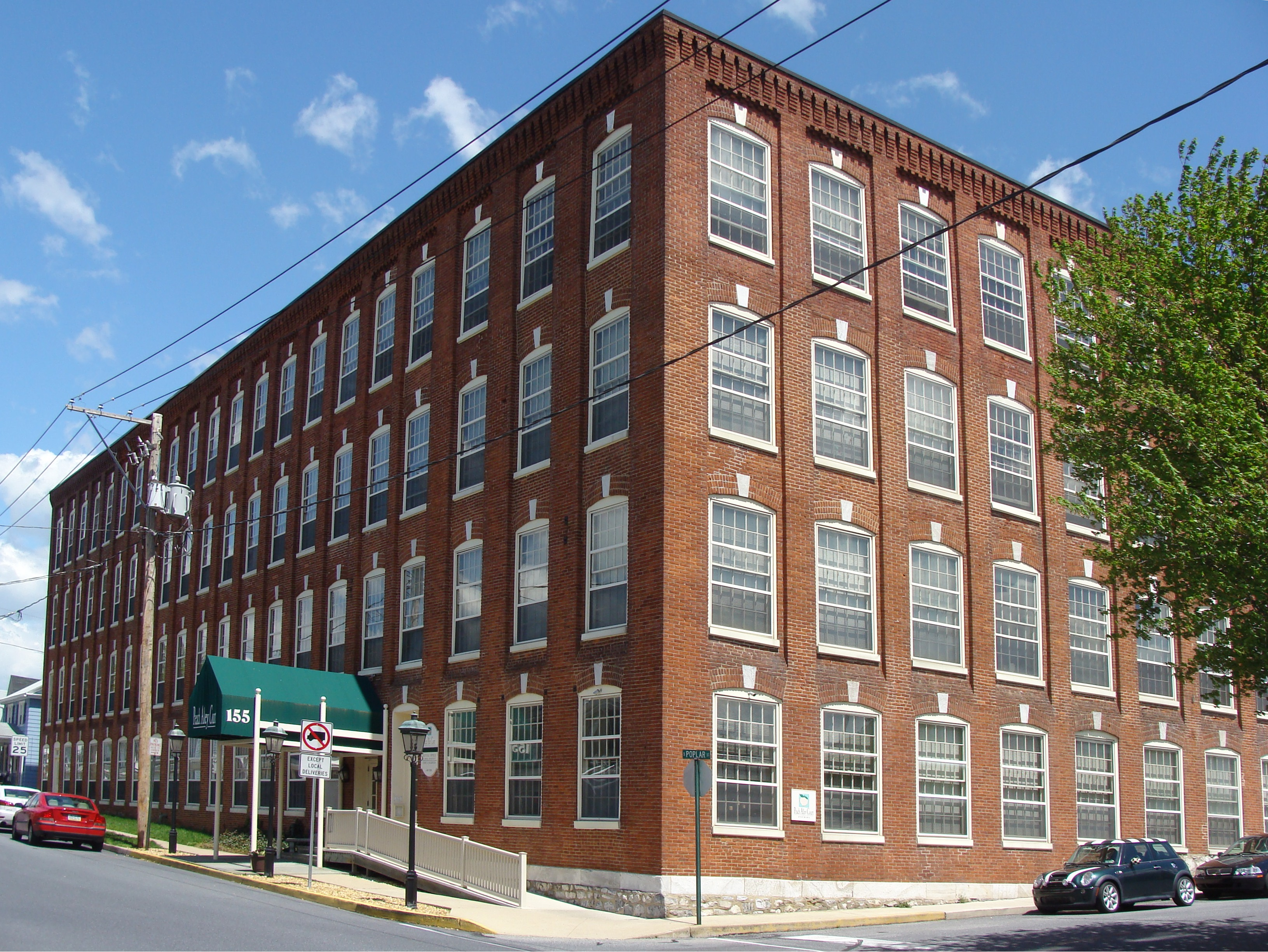
- Kreider Shoe Manufacturing Company, May 2011

- Location within Pennsylvania Location within the United States
- Location: 155 S. Poplar St., Elizabethtown, Pennsylvania
- Coordinates: 40°8′55″N 76°36′22″W
- Area: 1.6 acres (0.65 ha)
- Built: 1905
- NRHP reference No.: 80003515
- Added to NRHP: June 27, 1980

The Kreider Shoe Manufacturing Company is an historic factory building in Elizabethtown, Lancaster County, Pennsylvania, United States.

It was listed on the National Register of Historic Places in 1980.

== History and architectural features ==
Built in 1905, this historic structure is a three- to four-story, U-shaped, brick building, which is twenty-one bays wide and thirteen bays deep. Erected on a rough limestone foundation, it housed the A.S. Kreider Shoe Manufacturing Company until 1954, after which it was used as a garment factory. The building was remodeled, and is now used for apartment dwellings.
