= Conewago, Pennsylvania =

Unincorporated community in Pennsylvania, US

- Unincorporated community
- Location within Pennsylvania Location within the United States
- Coordinates: 40°9′29″N 76°39′37″W
- Country: United States
- State: Pennsylvania
- County: Lancaster
- Township: West Donegal
- Elevation: 420 ft (130 m)
- Time zone: UTC-5 (Eastern (EST))
  - Summer (DST): UTC-4 (EDT)
- Area code: 717
- GNIS feature ID: 1203322

Conewago is an unincorporated community in West Donegal Township in Lancaster County, Pennsylvania, United States. Conewago is located at the intersection of Zeager Road and Bossler Road, near Conewago Creek.
