= Killing of Blake Shearer =

2018 child homicide in Elizabethtown, Pennsylvania

- Victim Blake Shearer
- Location: Elizabethtown Borough Park, Elizabethtown, Pennsylvania, U.S.
- Date: August 6, 2018; 8 years ago
- Attack type: Child homicide by beating, manslaughter
- Victims: Blake John Shearer, aged 16
- Perpetrator: David Mikeal Skalla
- Motive: Anger over Shearer playing loud music
- Verdict: Pleaded guilty
- Convictions: Involuntary manslaughter, aggravated assault
- Sentence: 8 to 16 years in prison

On August 6, 2018, Blake John Shearer, a 16-year-old boy, was beaten to death in a park in Elizabethtown, Pennsylvania by 24-year old David Mikeal Skalla. The killing gained notoriety and media attention due to the brutality of the crime and the unusual nature of a killing occurring in the small town.

Skalla pleaded guilty to involuntary manslaughter and aggravated assault in the killing, and was sentenced to 8-to-16 years in prison in June 2019.

== Killing ==
On August 6, 2018, 16-year old Blake Shearer and his friends were playing loud music in Elizabethtown Borough Park in Elizabethtown, Pennsylvania when they were confronted by 24-year old David Skalla, who told them to turn the music down. When Shearer refused, Skalla proceeded to beat him until he was unconscious. Around twenty people reportedly watched the attack unfold and did not intervene. Skalla then left the park with his family.

Shearer was transferred to the hospital in critical condition. He suffered brain swelling, lung contusions, and an enlarged heart. He died on August 10, 2018, due to his injuries.

== Legal proceedings ==
Skalla was charged with aggravated assault and involuntary manslaughter, the least severe form of criminal homicide in Pennsylvania. He had already been in jail at the time due to a previous parole/probation violation. He reportedly lied to police that Shearer attacked him first, a claim which some witnesses contradicted. He faced up to 25 years in prison for his charges related to the killing.

In June 2019, Skalla pleaded guilty in exchange for a sentence of 8-to-16 years in prison, to which Shearer's family was outraged, stating that "justice wasn't served". At his sentencing, Skalla apologized for killing Shearer, claiming his death was an "accident".
