= Mount Joy Township, Lancaster County, Pennsylvania =

Township in Pennsylvania, US

Coordinates: 40°10′00″N 76°37′35″W

- Township
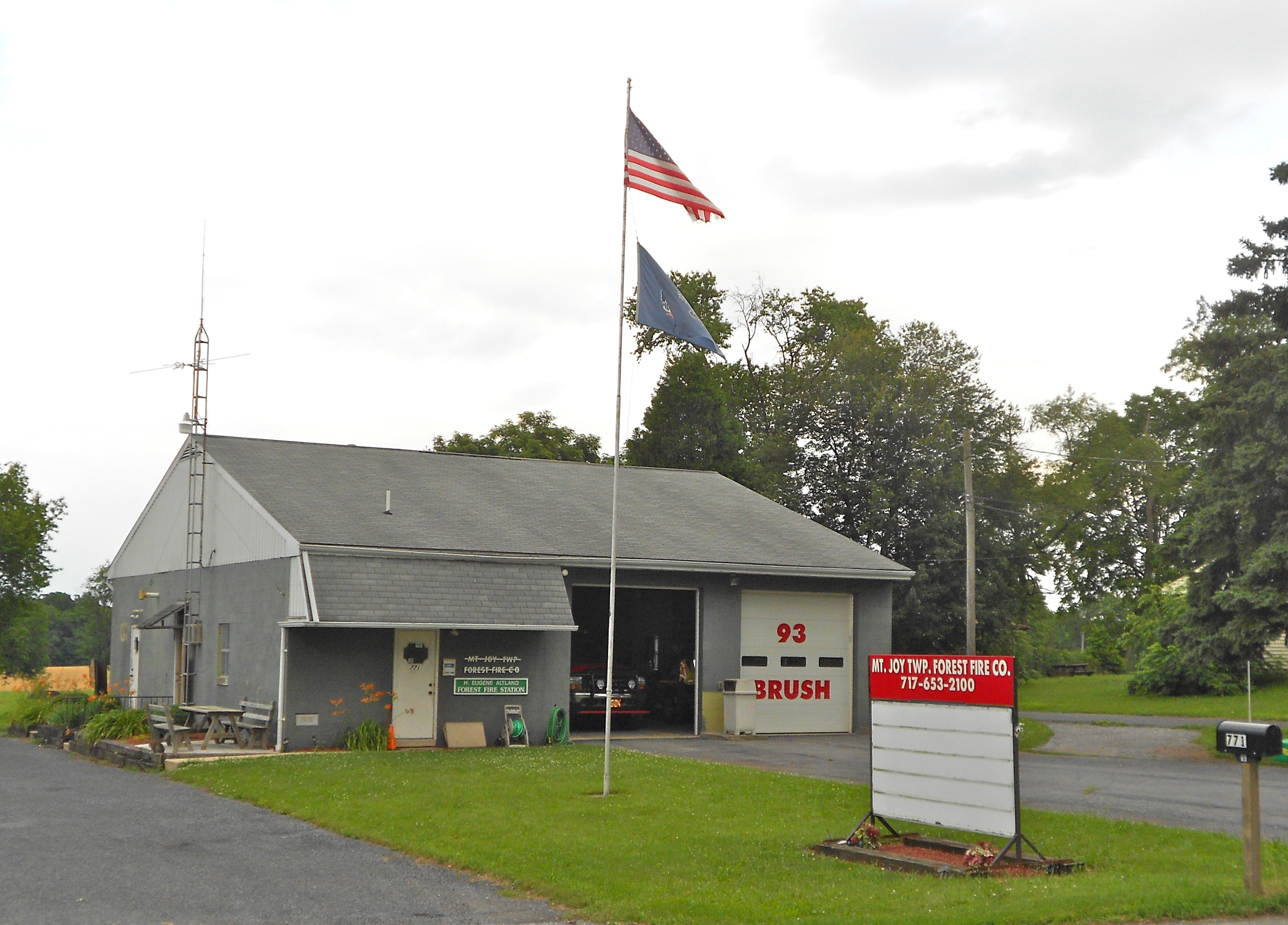
- Mt. Joy Township Forest Fire Co.

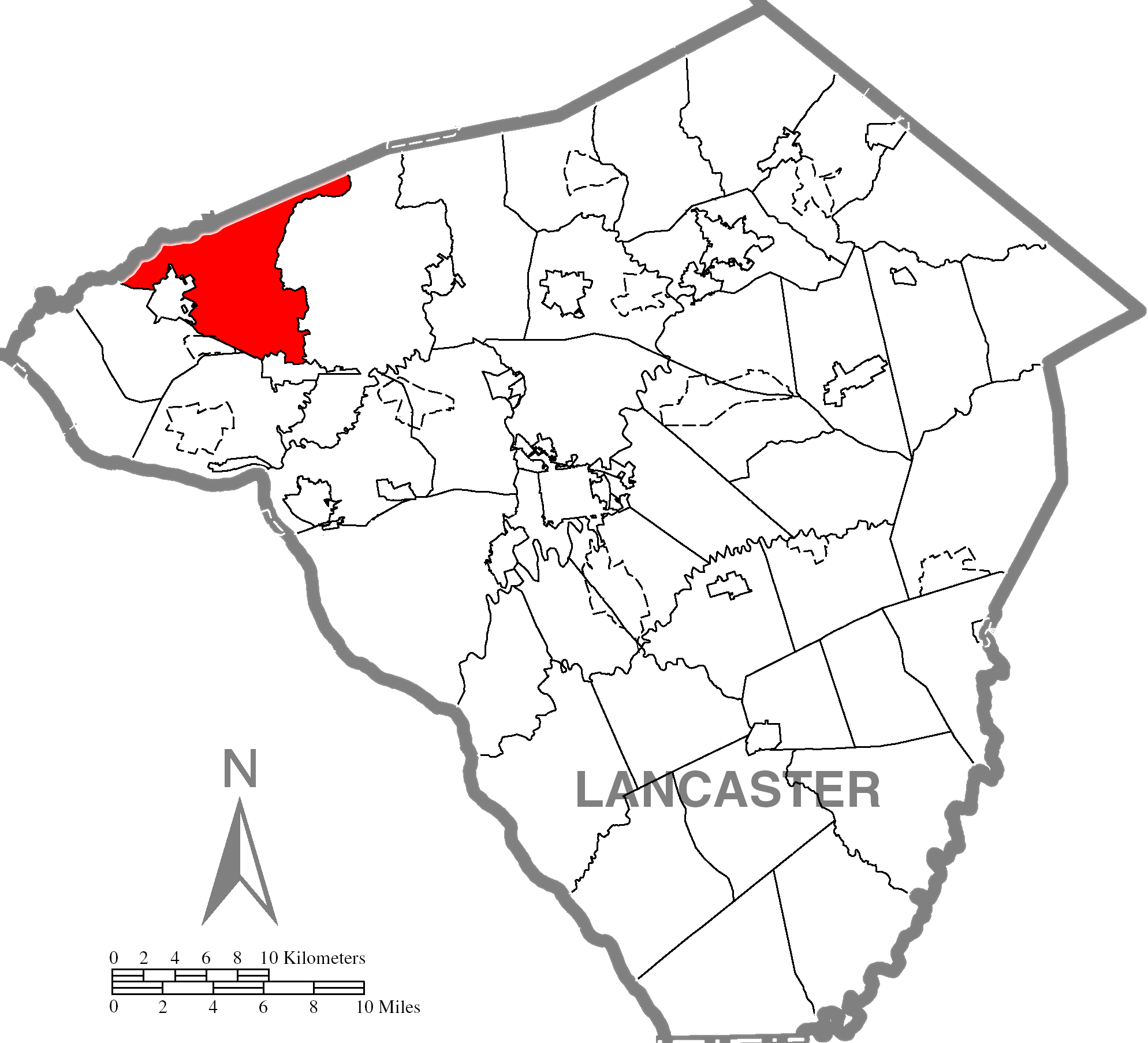
- Map of Lancaster County highlighting Mount Joy Township
- Country: United States
- State: Pennsylvania
- County: Lancaster
- Settled: 1735
- Incorporated: 1759

Government
  - Type: Board of Supervisors

Area
  - Total: 28.02 sq mi (72.56 km^{2})
  - Land: 27.83 sq mi (72.09 km^{2})
  - Water: 0.18 sq mi (0.47 km^{2})

Population (2020)
  - Total: 10,753 ▲
  - Estimate (2021): 10,785
  - Density: 388/sq mi (149.8/km^{2})
- Time zone: UTC-5 (Eastern (EST))
  - Summer (DST): UTC-4 (EDT)
- Area code: 717
- FIPS code: 42-071-51664
- Website: www.mtjoytwp.org

Mount Joy Township is a township that is located in northwestern Lancaster County, Pennsylvania, United States. The population was 10,753 at the time of the 2020 census.

== Geography ==
According to the United States Census Bureau, the township has a total area of 28.0 square miles (72.4 km^{2}), all land. The borough of Elizabethtown borders the township to the southwest, and the borough of Mount Joy borders the southern end of the township. Unincorporated communities in the township include Bellaire, Aberdeen, Milton Grove, Anchor, and part of Rheems.

== Demographics ==
Historical population
Census	Pop.	Note	%±
1850	2,626		—
1860	2,150		−18.1%
1870	2,037		−5.3%
1880	2,554		25.4%
1890	2,258		−11.6%
1900	2,252		−0.3%
1910	2,222		−1.3%
1920	2,022		−9.0%
1930	2,286		13.1%
1940	2,729		19.4%
1950	3,086		13.1%
1960	4,135		34.0%
1970	4,228		2.2%
1980	5,131		21.4%
1990	6,227		21.4%
2000	7,944		27.6%
2010	9,873		24.3%
2020	10,753		8.9%
2021 (est.)	10,785		0.3%
U.S. Decennial Census

As of the census of 2010, there were 9,873 people, 3,621 households, and 2,810 families living in the township.

The population density was 354.6 people per square mile. There were 3,768 housing units.

The racial makeup of the township was 95.3% White, 1.1% African American, 0.1% Native American, 1.0% Asian, 1.0% from other races, and 1.5% from two or more races. Hispanic or Latino of any race were 2.9% of the population.

There were 3,621 households, out of which 35.0% had children under the age of eighteen living with them; 65.5% were married couples living together, 8.4% had a female householder with no husband present, and 22.4% were non-families. 17.4% of all households were made up of individuals, and 5.4% had someone living alone who was sixty-five years of age or older.

The average household size was 2.73 and the average family size was 3.07.

Within the township, the population was spread out, with 26.0% under the age of 18 and 11.4% who were sixty-five years of age or older. The median age was 37.4 years.

== Government and infrastructure ==
The Pennsylvania Department of Corrections Training Academy is located in the township.

== Education ==
The township is served by the Elizabethtown Area School District and Donegal School District.
