= Kagerise Store and House =

- U.S. National Register of Historic Places
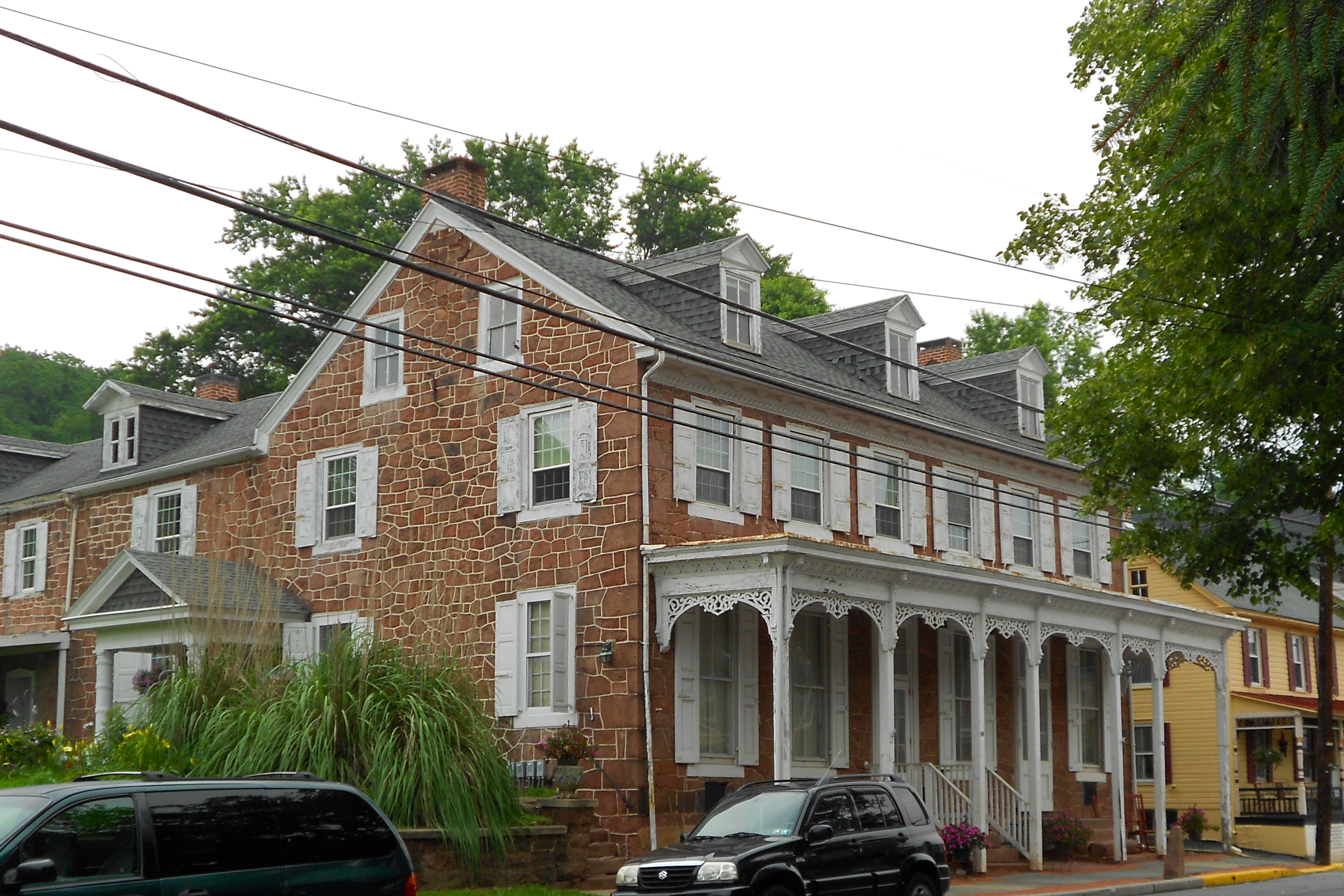

- Location within Pennsylvania Location within the United States
- Location: 84-86 W. Main St., Adamstown, Pennsylvania
- Coordinates: 40°14′33″N 76°3′30″W
- Area: 3.5 acres (1.4 ha)
- Built: 1827
- Architectural style: Stick/eastlake, Federal
- NRHP reference No.: 88002174
- Added to NRHP: November 3, 1988

The Kagerise Store and House, also known as the Harting's Store, is an historic commercial building and residence located in Adamstown in Lancaster County, Pennsylvania, United States.

It was listed on the National Register of Historic Places in 1988.

== History and architectural features ==
The original section of this historic structure was built in 1827, with later additions erected between 1850 and 1870. It is a 2 1/2-story, six-bay, U-shaped, sandstone building. The elaborate bracketed porch was added circa 1890. The building has elements of Federal and Eastlake movement-style details. Also located on the property is a contributing barn that was erected circa 1840.
