= Bollman Hat Company =

- Type: Employee-owned
- Industry: Headwear manufacturing
- Founded: 1868
- Founder: George Bollman
- Headquarters: Adamstown, Pennsylvania, United States
- Area served: Worldwide
- Products: Men's and women's hats
- Brands: Bailey; Betmar; Country Gentleman; Helen Kaminski; Ignite; Kangol (global rights)
- Number of employees: 300
- Website: bollmanhats.com

Bollman Hat Company was founded in 1868 (158 years ago) in Adamstown, Pennsylvania, United States. Bollman Hat Company manufactures men's and women's hats in Adamstown and has 300 employees on four continents.

== History ==
At the time that George Bollman set up his hat factory in Adamstown, Pennsylvania in 1868, the area was home to many hat makers, due to access to plentiful water. Hat manufacturing required a great deal of fresh water to both operate the machinery and to felt wool. Today, manufacturers use other means to power machinery and mills and use water reclamation technology to minimize water usage. This has enabled felt making and other textile manufacturing to move to sites that would otherwise be less suitable.

Hat making was, for many years, a major industry in Lancaster and Berks County where Adamstown is located. Bollman Hat Company became one of the best known hat makers in the region, supplying hat bodies (the unshaped felted wool cones) to hat makers up and down the east coast. Over time they bought out the majority of the other hat makers in Adamstown. Hat making is still the major manufacturing employer in Adamstown. Bollman is one of only two hat makers remaining in this area.

The hat making history is evident in the region, with many street names reflecting hat companies, or processing. In addition the many antique shops (Adamstown is quite renowned for its antique shops) have names reflecting the local hat making history, and are often located in former hat buildings and other factories.

Bollman is the only hat maker still working start (wool) to finish (hats) in Adamstown. As Bollman Hat Company acquired other brands including Bailey, Betmar, Country Gentleman, Helen Kaminski and Ignite, as well as, global rights to Kangol Headwear, Bollman become a global company.

Bollman Hat Company is also a private label hat maker for other fashion designers, including Marc Jacobs and Samuel L. Jackson and companies, including Cabela's sporting goods.

It was announced in February 2009 that Bollman were reviewing their worldwide operations, putting 33 jobs and the future of the Kangol head office in Cleator, England, in doubt. Currently the Kangol brand has moved to America and is designed in New York City and manufactured both overseas and in the Adamstown plant.

Bollman Hat Company now distributes to seventy seven countries.

== American made clothing and textiles ==
Prior to the 1970s, the majority of clothing worn by Americans was Made in USA. After tariffs and restrictions on imports were lifted, many manufacturing jobs left the United States. The textile and clothing industries were especially hard hit. Bollman Hat Company downsized significantly and laid off over 100 workers due to competition from less expensive imports. This led to the founding of American Made Matters by Bollman CEO Don Rongione. American Made Matters functions as a trade association that lists member companies that manufacture products in the US. In 2018, the Federal Trade Commission (FTC) reached a settlement with Bollman Hat Company regarding deceptive "Made in USA" claims. The FTC alleged that the company misrepresented American Made Matters as an independent third-party certifier when it was actually controlled by Bollman's leadership. Additionally, the FTC found that certain products promoted as "Made in USA" contained significant foreign content. Under the settlement, Bollman and American Made Matters were prohibited from making misleading claims and were required to disclose the connection between the company and the certification entity. According to some analyses, there has been a revival of interest in American-made products since the economic downturn in the 2000s, which has helped some remaining American textile companies. However, others dispute this claim, arguing that US manufacturing has continued to decline.

== Company organization ==
Bollman Hat Company was founded by Mr. George Bollman in 1868. Bollman was a family owned business for most of its history. Bollman became an employee owned business in 1985.

The company is headquartered in Adamstown, Pennsylvania, with wool scouring facilities in Texas and showrooms and sales and design offices in New York City and Sydney, Australia. Other showrooms include London, Denver, Colorado and Atlanta, Georgia.

== Celebrity, television, and films ==
Bollman Hats have covered many Hollywood actors from Humphrey Bogart to Fred Astaire and from Samuel L. Jackson to Nicole Kidman; musicians from Run DMC to Eminem and from Pete Townshend to Ne-Yo; athletes from Michael Jordan to Donovan McNabb and from Chi Chi Rodriguez to Jimmy Rollins.

Some notable moments in celebrity history include: Bailey Hats were the provider of official hats for the Mickey Mouse Club the space patrol and Hopalong Cassidy

Samuel L. Jackson wore a Kangol hat in the movie Jackie Brown.

W magazine has featured several celebrities wearing Bollman owned brands on their covers.

Kaminski Hats maintains a celebrity watch, with photos of famous actresses wearing their hats.

Kangol berets are well known, and were worn by many celebrities, from General Montgomery to LL Cool J.

Various Kangol and Bollman Hat brands were used in the movie New Jack City.

== See also ==
- International Ladies' Garment Workers' Union
