= Kangol =

English clothing company

- Type: Subsidiary
- Industry: Textile
- Founded: 1938; 88 years ago
- Founder: Jacques Spreiregen
- Headquarters: Cleator, Cumbria, England
- Parent: Frasers Group
- Website: kangol.com

Kangol is a British clothing company famous for its headwear. The name Kangol reflects the original materials for production, the K coming from the word 'silK' (a recent attribution to 'Knitting' is incorrect), the ANG from 'ANGora', and the OL from 'woOL'. Although no Kangol hat has ever been manufactured in Australia, the Kangaroo logo was adopted by Kangol in 1983 because Americans commonly asked where they could get "the Kangaroo hat".

== Early history ==
Founded in 1938 by a Polish Jew, Jacques Spreiregen, Kangol produced hats for workers, golfers, and especially soldiers. Spreiregen, born Jacob Henryk Spreiregen in Warsaw in 1893, emigrated with his family to Paris in 1906. He then moved to London in 1914, where he worked as an importer and seller of various products that included wool, woollen goods, and berets. He served in the British Army in World War I, joining the Labour Corps to drive ambulances, and obtained British nationality in 1920. In 1938, he was joined by his nephew Joseph Meisner to open and run the first Kangol factory at Cleator, Cumbria. A second factory was opened at nearby Frizington, and later, under the direction of Spreiregen's younger nephew Sylvain Meisner, a third factory, manufacturing motorcycle helmets and seat belts in Carlisle. Kangol was the major supplier of berets for the armed forces during World War II and the Cold War; the company also provided the berets for the British Olympic Team in 1948.

== Recent history ==
Kangol has been owned by Frasers Group since 2006, when it acquired the brand from private-equity fund August Equity Trust. Licences to manufacture and sell Kangol apparel have been sold to many different companies, including D2 and Topshop. In 2002, the Kangol apparel brand was acquired by Kangol Clothing North America LLC, a subsidiary of Chesterfield Manufacturing Corp in Charlotte North Carolina. In 2003, Chesterfield was acquired by Tomasello Inc, owned by David W. Tomasello. In 2008, the company was consolidated into Chesterfield Holdings Inc. Currently led by Austin J. Tomasello, CEO. The global rights to Kangol hats have been held by American hatmakers Bollman Hat Company since 2002.

It was announced, in February 2009, that Bollman were reviewing their worldwide operations, putting 33 jobs and the future of the Kangol head office in Cleator in doubt. On 6 April 2009, it was announced that the original factory would be converted to a warehouse with the loss of 25 jobs. No employees now remain employed at the company's original site as the outlet shop closed at the end of August 2009. The site in Frizington is now a housing estate, whilst the original Cleator site has been partly demolished to provide a Park & Ride facility for nearby Sellafield and to facilitate other potential redevelopment. However, hats will continue to be made at their sites in Eastern Europe and the United States.

== Pop fashion ==
In the 1960s, designers Mary Quant and Pierre Cardin worked with the company, whose products graced the heads of the rich and famous, including the Beatles and Arnold Palmer, and later Diana, Princess of Wales. The company also supplied uniformed organisations such as the Scout Association.

In the 1980s, Kangol berets entered a new phase of fashion history with their adoption by members of the hip-hop community, such as Grandmaster Flash, Run-DMC, LL Cool J, Slick Rick, Kangol Kid of UTFO, and The Notorious B.I.G.

The brand was popularised even more by the 1991 movie New Jack City. The release of more consciously stylish products in the 1990s such as the furgora (angora-wool mix) Spitfire, was helped by its presence upon the head of Samuel L. Jackson in 1997. Kevin Eubanks, bandleader for The Tonight Show with Jay Leno, sported a Kangol beret on an almost nightly basis.

In 2009, Eminem wore the Cotton Twill Army Cap Kangol hat on his Beautiful video. As of 2024, Eminem's main hat style has been Kangol's army caps.

== In popular culture ==
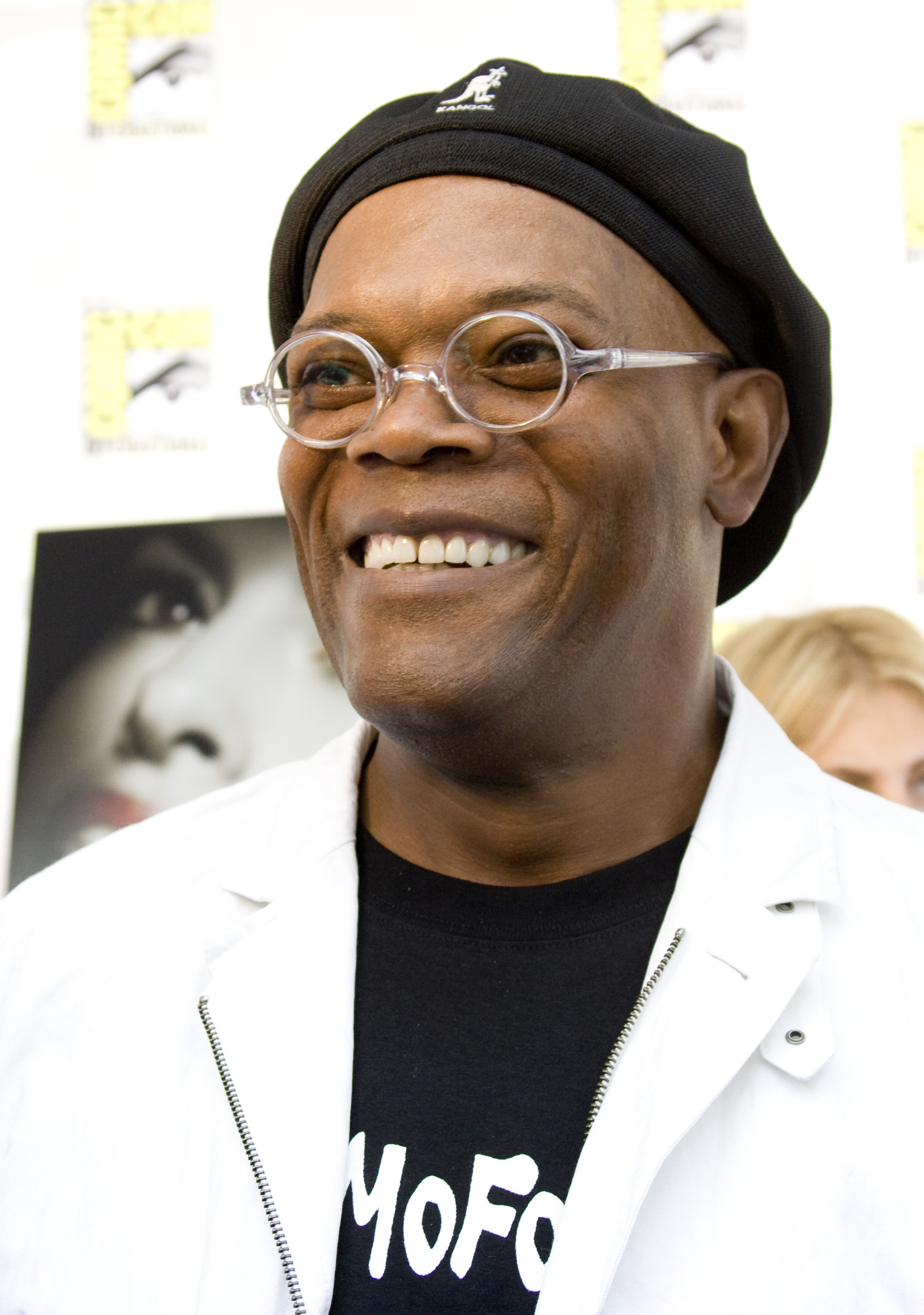
Samuel L. Jackson at San Diego ComicCon 2008

- The Kangol Bermuda Casual bucket hat served as the iconic signature headwear for rap artist/actor LL Cool J early in his music career.
- Rap and hip-hop artists Slick Rick, Dana Dane, De La Soul and N.W.A have referenced Kangol in their lyrics.
- Wesley Snipes as Nino Brown and his gang, the Cash Money Brothers, wear hats by Kangol throughout the film New Jack City.
- Samuel L. Jackson is known for wearing Kangol hats. His character Ordell Robbie wore a Kangol back to front in the film Jackie Brown.
- The film Straight Outta Compton features a scene where Ice Cube gets into a dispute with a rapper, eventually telling him "Wearing a Kangol don't make you LL Cool J!"
- Soul singer Gregory Porter wears a Kangol Summer Spitfire cap.
