= Adamstown, Pennsylvania =

Borough in Pennsylvania, US

Adamstown, Pennsylvania Adamschteddel (Pennsylvania German)
- Borough
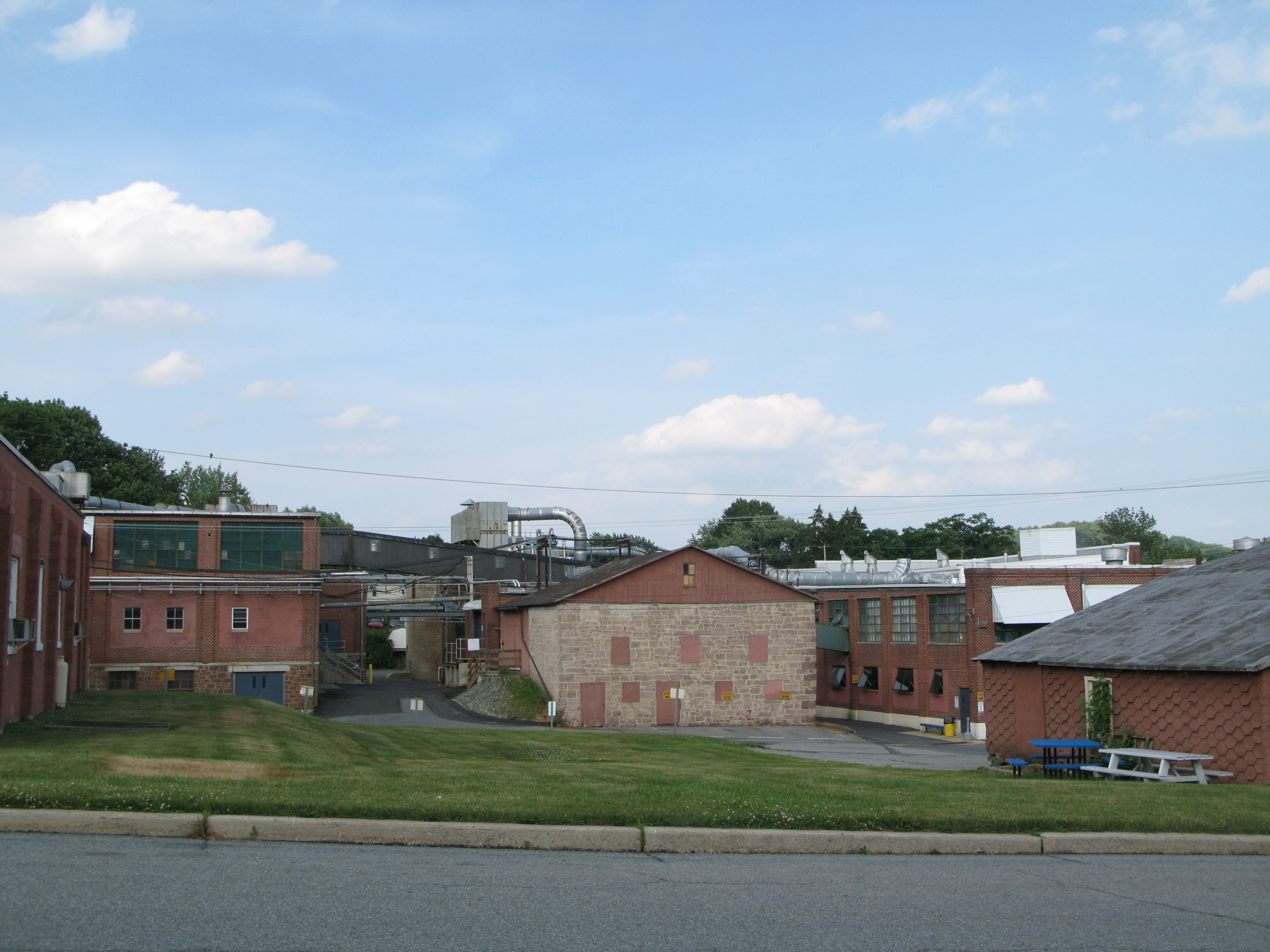
- Bollman Hat Factory

- Location on the border of Lancaster and Berks Counties, Pennsylvania

- Location in Pennsylvania and the United States Adamstown (the United States)
- Coordinates: 40°14′30″N 76°03′28″W
- Country: United States
- State: Pennsylvania
- Counties: Lancaster, Berks

Area
  - Total: 1.39 sq mi (3.59 km^{2})
  - Land: 1.38 sq mi (3.57 km^{2})
  - Water: 0.0077 sq mi (0.02 km^{2})
- Elevation: 568 ft (173 m)

Population (2020)
  - Total: 1,938
  - Density: 1,404.6/sq mi (542.33/km^{2})
- Time zone: UTC-5 (EST)
  - Summer (DST): UTC-4 (EDT)
- ZIP Code: 19501
- Area code: 717
- FIPS code: 42-00364
- Website: adamstownborough.org

Adamstown (Pennsylvania German: Adamschteddel) is a borough that is located in Lancaster County (primarily) and Berks County in the U.S. state of Pennsylvania.

The population was 1,938 at the time of the 2020 census. Of this, 1,772 were residents of Lancaster County and only seventeen were living in Berks County.

== History ==
Adamstown was initially founded on July 4, 1761, by William Addams on the site of a former village of Native Americans, and Addams named the community Addamsburry. The community was incorporated as a borough on April 2, 1850, following the passage of a bill by the Pennsylvania General Assembly that was introduced by Representative Joseph Konigmacher the previous month. That year, the borough's population was 307.

In 1855, a new stage coach route was established from Lancaster to Reading, which included stops in the communities of Adamstown, Reamstown, Ephrata, New Berlin, and Oregon. The fare from Reading to Adamstown was fifty cents.

The Kagerise Store and House was listed on the National Register of Historic Places in 1988.

The town promotes itself as the antiques capital of the United States because it attracts many antiques dealers and collectors. Adamstown is home to the Stoudt's Brewery, Pennsylvania's first microbrewery, which was established here in 1987. The town is also home to the US's oldest hat manufacturer, the Bollman Hat Company, which was established in 1868.

== Geography ==
According to the U.S. Census Bureau, the borough has a total area of 1.4 square miles (3.6 km^{2}), all land.

== Demographics ==
Historical population
| Census | Pop. | Note | %± |
|---|---|---|---|
| 1860 | 432 | | — |
| 1870 | 431 | | −0.2% |
| 1880 | 701 | | 62.6% |
| 1890 | 603 | | −14.0% |
| 1900 | 597 | | −1.0% |
| 1910 | 675 | | 13.1% |
| 1920 | 800 | | 18.5% |
| 1930 | 909 | | 13.6% |
| 1940 | 955 | | 5.1% |
| 1950 | 1,020 | | 6.8% |
| 1960 | 1,190 | | 16.7% |
| 1970 | 1,202 | | 1.0% |
| 1980 | 1,119 | | −6.9% |
| 1990 | 1,108 | | −1.0% |
| 2000 | 1,203 | | 8.6% |
| 2010 | 1,789 | | 48.7% |
| 2020 | 1,938 | | 8.3% |

At the time of the 2010 census, Adamstown had a population of 1,789. The median age was 37.5. The racial and ethnic composition of the population was 91.3% non-Hispanic white, 1.1% black or African American, 0.3% Native American, 4.4% Asian, 0.1% Pacific Islander, 1.6% of two or more race and 1.7% Hispanic or Latino.

At the time of the 2000 census, there were 1,203 people, 501 households and 351 families living in the borough.

The population density was 880.7 inhabitants per square mile (340.0/km^{2}). There were 533 housing units at an average density of 390.2 units per square mile (150.7 units/km^{2}).

The racial makeup of the borough was 99.09% White, 0.08% African American, 0.25% Asian, 0.42% from other races, and 0.17% from two or more races. Hispanic or Latino of any race were 1.00% of the population.

There were 501 households, of which 29.5% had children who were under the age of eighteen living with them; 59.1% were married couples living together, 7.2% had a female householder with no husband present, and 29.9% were non-families. 24.8% of all households were made up of individuals, and 10.8% had someone living alone who was sixty-five years of age or older.

The average household size was 2.40 and the average family size was 2.85.

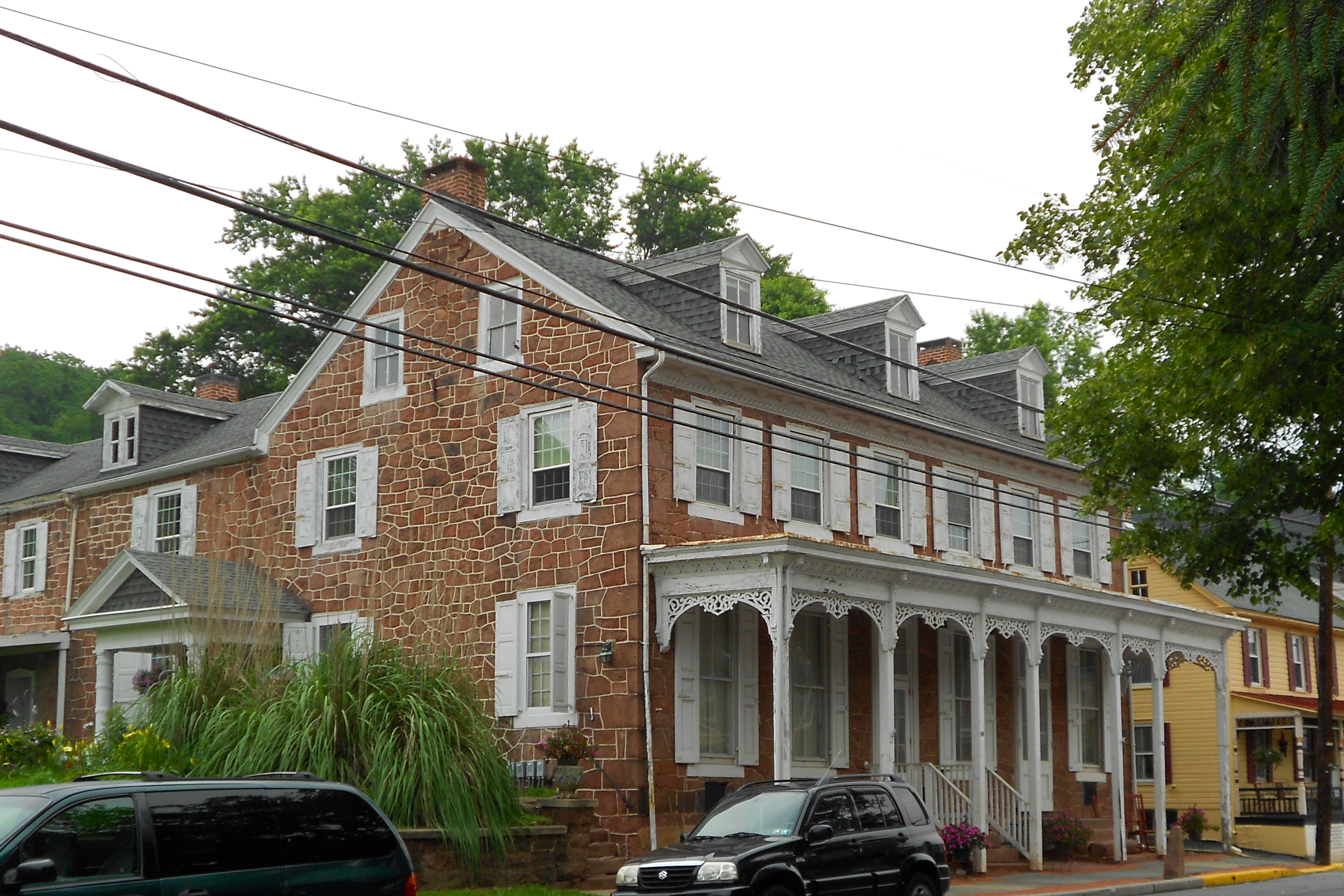
Kagarise Store and House

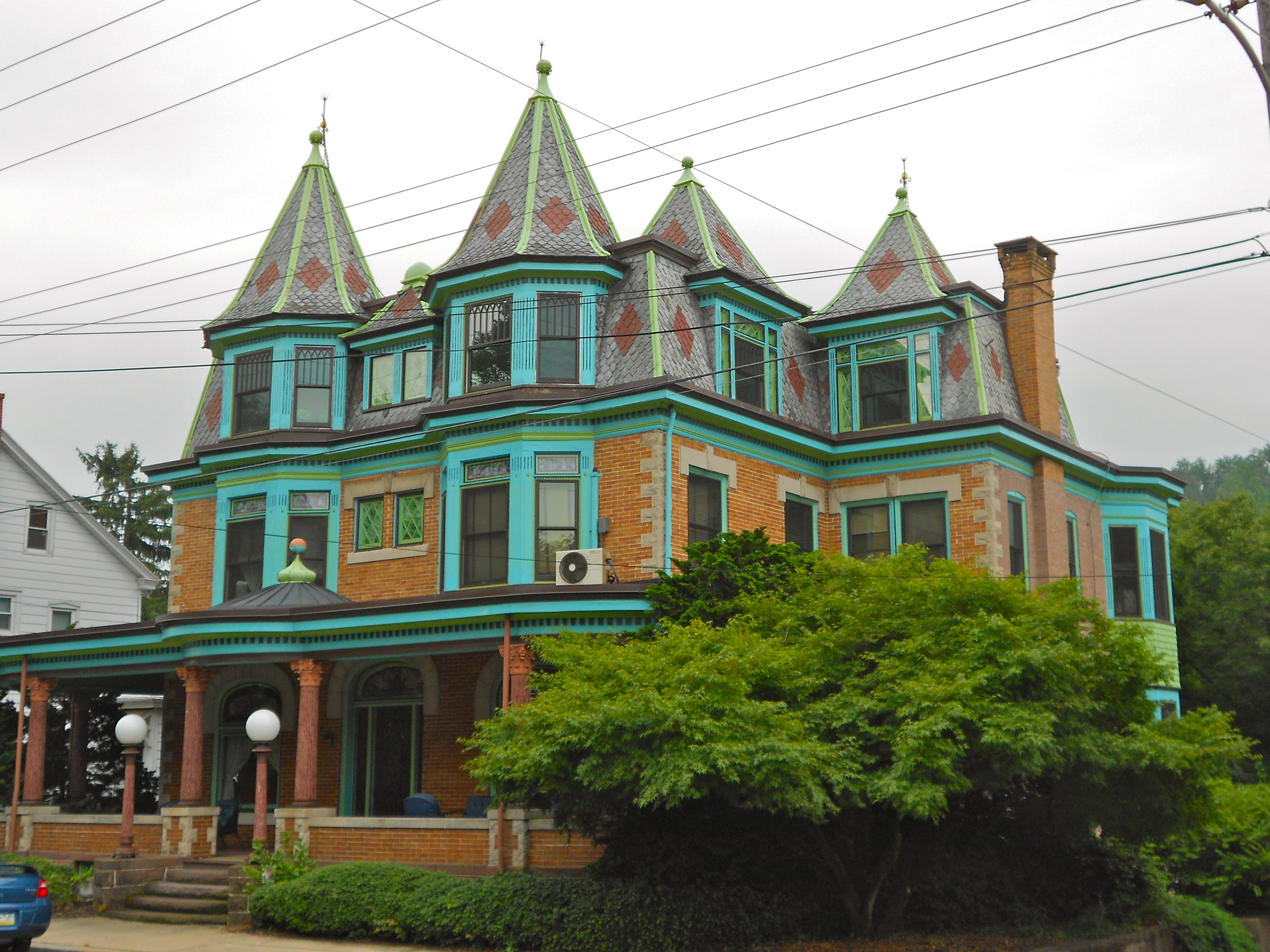
House on West Main Street

A Walk up Main Street, video (2 minutes), Gallery format

Slightly less than 23% of residents were under the age of eighteen, 5.6% were aged eighteen to twenty-four, 33.3% were aged twenty-five to forty-four, 23.3% were aged forty-five to sixty-four, and 14.9% were sixty-five years of age or older. The median age was thirty-seven years.

For every one hundred females, there were 94.7 males. For every one hundred females who were aged eighteen or older, there were 91.9 males.

The median household income was $43,578 and the median family income was $47,337. Males had a median income of $35,000 compared with that of $25,400 for females.

The per capita income for the borough was $20,840.

Approximately 1.4% of families and 2.4% of the population were living below the poverty line, including 3.0% of those who were under the age of eighteen and 2.8% of those who were aged sixty-five or older.

== Notable person ==
- Eugene Shirk, former Mayor of Reading, Pennsylvania

== Schools ==
- Adamstown Elementary (Cocalico School District)

== Public services ==
The Adamstown Area Library is located at 110 W Main Street. The library formerly shared a building with the Adamstown Borough office on North Reading Road, but was moved to a new location one block to the north in a newly constructed building.

In recent years, the role and responsibility of the library has increased. It became a full-fledged member of the Library System of Lancaster County and is now responsible for providing library services to the 31,000+ residents of Adamstown, Brecknock, Denver, East Cocalico and West Cocalico. The library is run by its own board of trustees.

The spirit of volunteerism is still strong in the library and volunteers continue to play a key role in ensuring the library is funded and assisting in library functions. The library also now benefits from a staff of full-time and part-time trained employees, including a Library Director who holds a master's degree in library and information science.

== Transportation ==
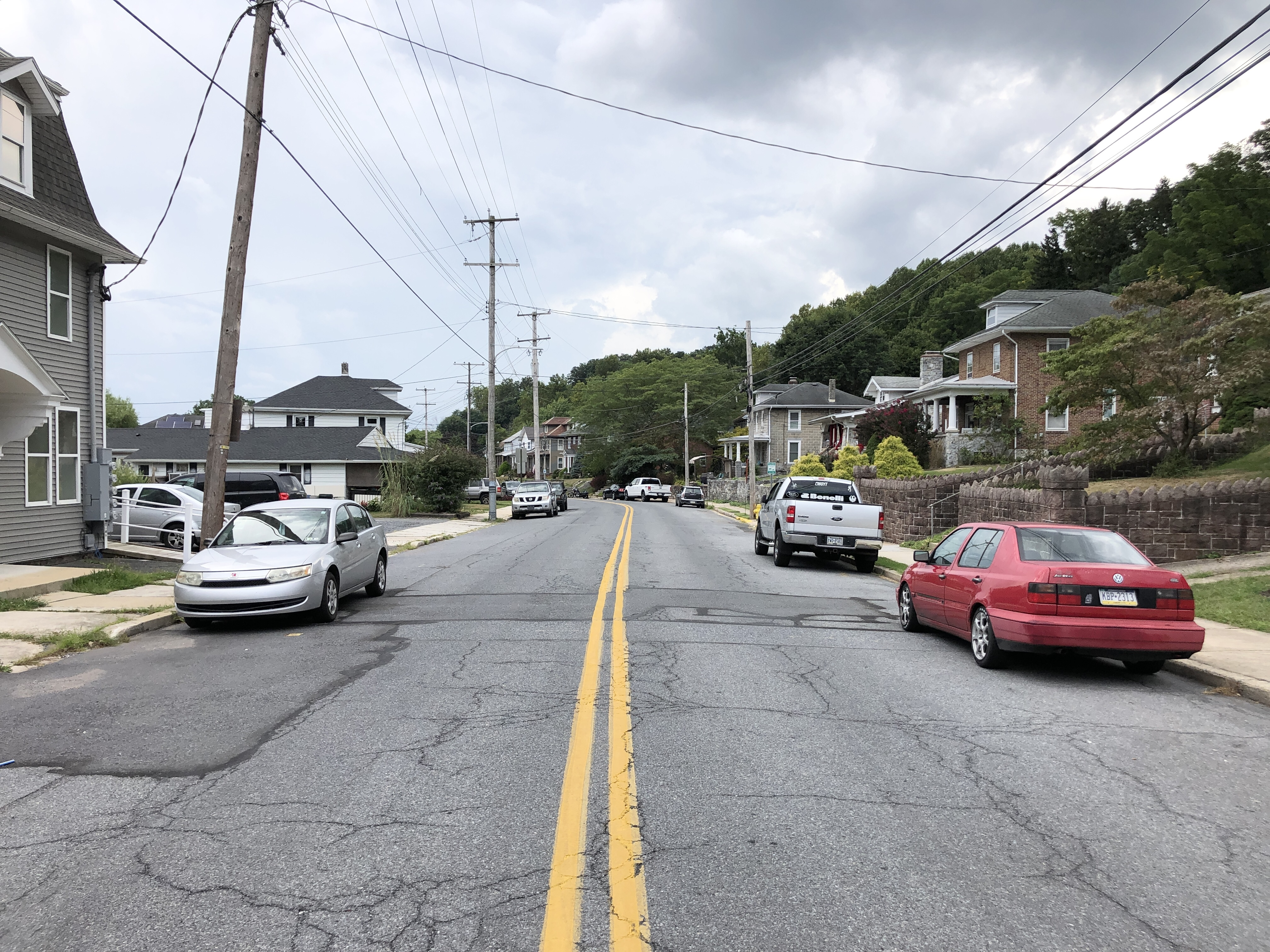
View southwest along Main Street entering Adamstown

As of 2013, there were 9.36 miles (15.06 km) of public roads in Adamstown, of which 2.67 miles (4.30 km) were maintained by the Pennsylvania Department of Transportation (PennDOT) and 6.69 miles (10.77 km) were maintained by the borough.

Pennsylvania Route 272 is the only numbered road serving Adamstown. It follows North Reading Road along a southwest–northeast alignment through the center of the borough, just southeast of Main Street.
