= Library System of Lancaster County =

Libraries in Pennsylvania, United States

Coordinates: 40.05371°N 76.23445°W

- Location: Lancaster County, Pennsylvania
- Established: 1987
- Branches: 14 member libraries, 3 branches, bookmobile

Collection
- Size: 909,968 holdings

Access and use
- Circulation: 3,495,399 (2008)
- Population served: 519,462
- Members: 218,456

Other information
- Website: lancasterlibraries.org

The Library System of Lancaster County (LSLC) is a federated system, which serves 519,462 residents in Lancaster County, Pennsylvania. It is made up of a consortium of 14 member libraries, two branches and a bookmobile. LSLC was established in April 1987 to provide well-coordinated, countywide services and cooperative programs to assist member libraries in meeting the diverse needs of its residents. The LSLC support and centralized services include public Internet access, a shared online public access catalog (OPAC) system, database- and online homework-help research services, consulting services, continuing education training in internal library operations (including budgeting and accounting), governance, business-information services, youth services, public relations, assistance with countywide programs and services, technology support (including WANs – wide area networks – and LANs with servers for managing telecommunications), web hosting, email, calendars, the catalog, circulation, headquarters and library PCs and peripherals, training and security. The system also provides services for ordering, cataloging and processing library materials with collection development, collective purchasing, managing catalog databases, negotiating vendor discounts, and outreach services to special populations through the bookmobile and collection development.

== Purpose ==
The purpose of the system is to bring together its 14-member public libraries to plan and create a cost-effective network of technology, facilities and resources to meet the informational, educational and recreational needs of the residents of Lancaster County. The Library System ensures that a network of support services is provided to member libraries.

== Recent activity (as of 2011) ==
In the first decade of the 21st century, the Lancaster County libraries saw more than a doubling in the number of county residents using libraries; 251,348 county residents had library cards. In the same ten-year period, circulation increased by 90%; 3,495,399 items were checked out. The system's online catalog had over 913,006 library holdings shared throughout the county. A large number of virtual visitors accessed the online catalog and databases through the library system website. Over 340,335 sessions, logins or visits to LSLC databases were made annually; most of those searches were accessed remotely from home, business, school or work.

The LSLC also delivers services via a bookmobile. It provides countywide service in the form of over 800 stops per year in primarily low- and moderate-income areas of the county, with special focus on children and older adults. The bookmobile outreach effort includes providing services to traditionally underserved groups (such as the Amish) and outreach at the Youth Intervention Center. As an agent of the Commonwealth of Pennsylvania and Lancaster County, the system promotes the improvement of member library services by providing countywide planning, policy development, centralized support services and access to core resources.

== Member libraries ==
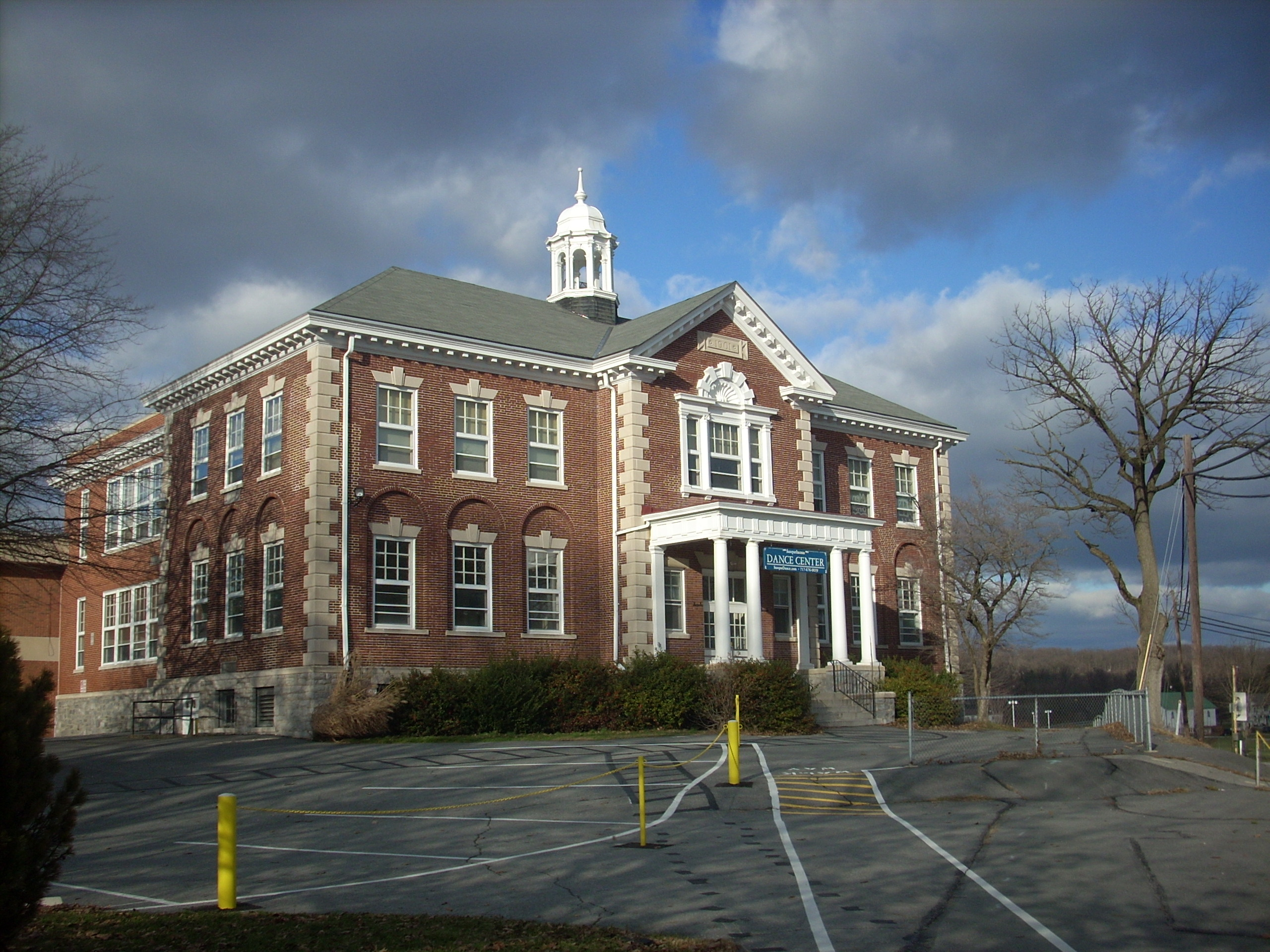
Lancaster Public Library branch in Mountville

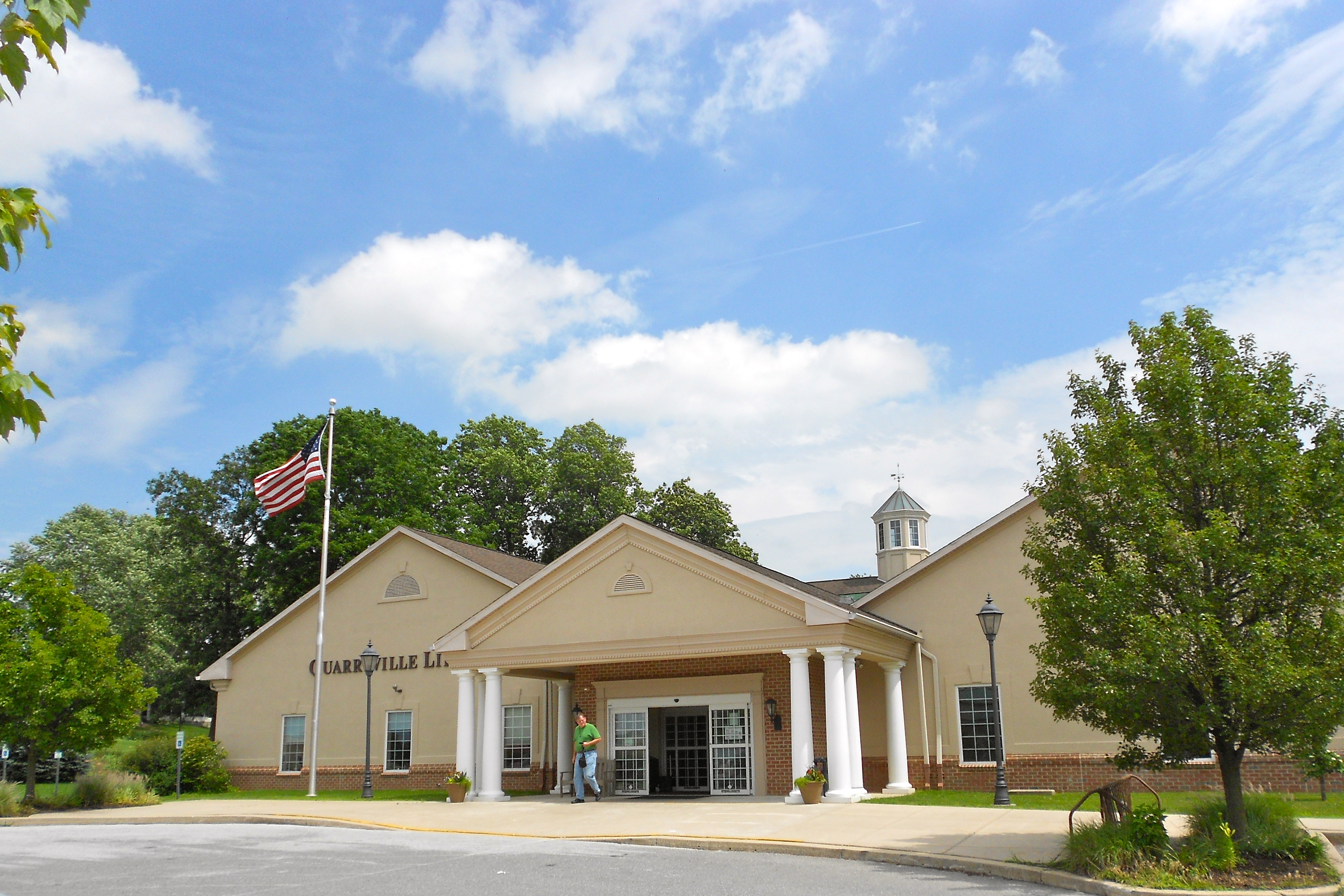
Quarryville Public Library

- Adamstown Area Library (serving Adamstown, Brecknock, Denver, East Cocalico and West Cocalico)
- Columbia Public Library
- Eastern Lancaster County Library (serving, Terre Hill, Caernarvon, Earl and East Earl, and New Holland)
- Elizabethtown Public Library
- Ephrata Public Library
- Lancaster Public Library (branches at Queen Street (Lancaster City) and Mountville)
- Lititz Public Library
- Manheim Community Library
- Manheim Township Public Library
- Milanof-Schock Library (serving Mount Joy and Marietta Boroughs and the townships of East Donegal, Mount Joy and Rapho)
- Moores Memorial Library (serving Christiana and surrounding areas)
- Intercourse Library (Intercourse and Gap branches)
- Quarryville Library
- Strasburg-Heisler Library
- Shut's Environmental Library (in Lancaster County's Central Park)

Each member library has a website accessible through the system's website.

== Bookmobile ==
The bookmobile makes regular stops at 80 locations in Lancaster County. Stops include senior-citizen centers, assisted-living centers, preschools, after-school programs, rural areas and urban neighborhoods. The bookmobile offers thousands of books (including large print and audiobooks) and DVDs. It has a wheelchair lift for accessibility. The bookmobile brings library services to people who have trouble getting them otherwise, with the highest priority to low- and moderate-income neighborhoods and organizations; low- and moderate-income individuals and families; senior citizens; children and rural areas.
