= Elizabethtown, Pennsylvania =

Borough in Pennsylvania, US

Elizabethtown, Pennsylvania Betzischteddel (Pennsylvania German)
- Borough
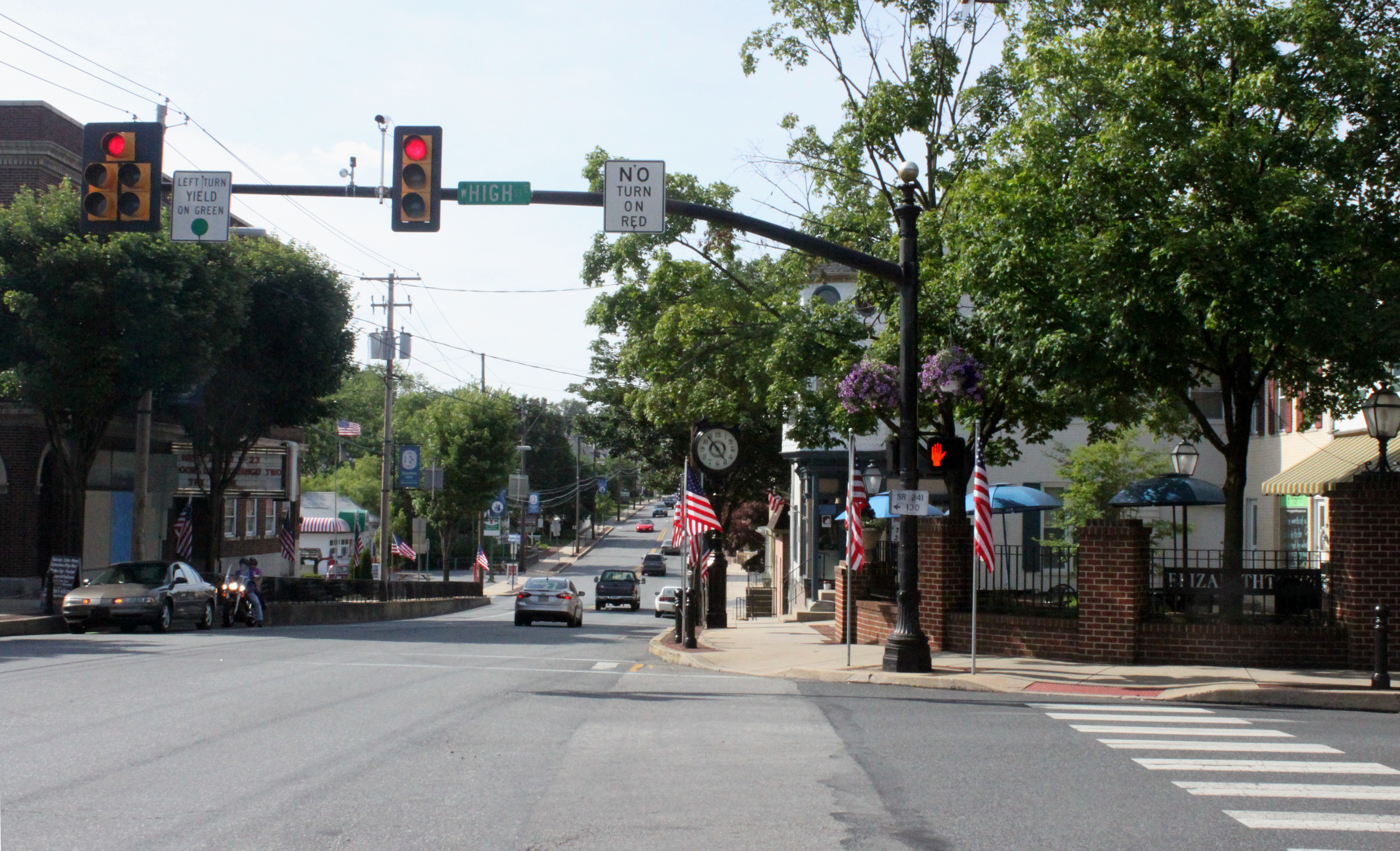
- Center Square at High and Market streets in 2013
- Nickname: "E-Town"
- Location of Elizabethtown in Lancaster County, Pennsylvania (left) and of Lancaster County in Pennsylvania (right)

- Location in Pennsylvania Location in the United States
- Coordinates: 40°9′12″N 76°36′2″W
- Country: United States
- State: Pennsylvania
- County: Lancaster
- Settled: 1753

Government
  - Mayor: Philip Clark (R)

Area
  - Total: 2.66 sq mi (6.90 km^{2})
  - Land: 2.65 sq mi (6.87 km^{2})
  - Water: 0.012 sq mi (0.03 km^{2})
- Elevation: 463 ft (141 m)

Population (2020)
  - Total: 11,639
  - Density: 4,388.2/sq mi (1,694.29/km^{2})
- Time zone: UTC-5 (EST)
  - Summer (DST): UTC-4 (EDT)
- ZIP Code: 17022
- Area codes: 717 and 223
- FIPS code: 42-23016
- Website: www.etownonline.com

Elizabethtown (Pennsylvania German: Betzischteddel) is a borough in Lancaster County, Pennsylvania, United States. It is located 18 miles (29 km) southeast of Harrisburg, the state capital. Small factories existed at the turn of the 20th century when the population in 1900 was 1,861. As of the 2020 census, the population of the borough was 11,639. Elizabethtown is commonly referred to in south-central Pennsylvania as E-Town. This nickname is also used for the local college and high school.

== History ==
There are two stories about the origin of the town's name. In one version it is named after Elizabeth Reeby, wife of Michael Reeby who sold the first building lots here in about 1795. The officially accepted history is that, in 1753, Captain Barnabas Hughes acquired land and laid out a town, naming it for his wife, Elizabeth. The early settlers were primarily Scots-Irish and Pennsylvania Dutch. In 1758 General John Forbes supplied the expedition to Fort Duquesne with flour and oats and stationed a regiment here to protect his supplies.

Elizabethtown became a borough in 1827, and a railroad was built through the area in the 1830s. The town was primarily agricultural until the early 1900s, when the Klein Chocolate Company (now part of Mars, Inc.) and several shoe factories, the last of which closed in 1979, opened. Elizabethtown College was established in 1899, and the Masonic Homes, now the Masonic Village,) followed in 1910.

Following the end of World War II, Elizabethtown grew rapidly, more than doubling its population between 1950 and 2000. Homes and businesses expanded into nearby farmland, making sprawl, farmland preservation, and revitalizing the downtown area important issues.

Kreider Shoe Manufacturing Company in Elizabethtown was listed on the National Register of Historic Places in 1980.

== Public officials ==
=== Borough council ===
The Elizabethtown Borough Council has six members representing three voting wards. Each council member is elected to a four-year term. They are responsible for setting policy in every aspect of the borough, including budgeting, public works, zoning, and ordinances.

Mayor

The mayor is elected to a four-year term and is responsible for overseeing the police department and performing ceremonial duties. The mayor casts votes at borough council meetings only in the event of a tie. The current mayor is Phillip Clark (R).

=== State and federal ===
- State Representative: Tom Jones (R)
- State Senator: Ryan Aument (R)
- U. S. Representative: Lloyd Smucker (R)

== Geography ==
Elizabethtown is located in northwestern Lancaster County at 40°9′12″N 76°36′2″W (40.153207, -76.600431). Pennsylvania Route 230 passes through the center of town, leading northwest 18 miles (29 km) to Harrisburg and southeast 6 miles (10 km) to Mount Joy. Pennsylvania Route 283, a four-lane freeway, touches the northeast boundary of the borough and provides access from an interchange with PA 743. PA 283 leads southeast 18 miles (29 km) to Lancaster and northwest the same distance to Harrisburg. PA 743 leads north 10 miles (16 km) to Hershey and south 8 miles (13 km) to Marietta.

According to the U.S. Census Bureau, the borough of Elizabethtown has a total area of 2.7 square miles (6.9 km^{2}), of which 0.01 square miles (0.03 km^{2}), or 0.51%, are water. The borough is drained primarily by Conoy Creek, which flows southwest to the Susquehanna River at Bainbridge.

The borough has a hot-summer humid continental climate (Dfa), and average monthly temperatures range from 30.1 °F (−1.1 °C) in January to 74.9 °F (23.8 °C) in July. The hardiness zone is 6b.

== Government and infrastructure ==
The Pennsylvania Department of Corrections Training Academy is located in Mount Joy Township, near Elizabethtown.

== Emergency Medical Services ==
In 2024, Municipal Emergency Services Authority ("MESA") of Lancaster County replaced Northwest EMS, the former ALS/BLS ambulance service for Elizabethtown Borough and surrounding municipalities: Marietta Borough, West Donegal Township, East Donegal Township, Conoy Township, and Mount Joy Township. While Pennsylvania ambulance services rely on financially insolvent revenue streams, such as reimbursement, subscriptions, and donations, municipal leaders designed MESA to remain financially solvent through a mandatory annual fee from every household and business in the district.

Prior to the transition from Northwest, MESA leaders invited regional municipalities to join the new authority. Five Lancaster County municipalities: Rapho Township, Manheim Borough, Penn Township, Elizabeth Township, and Clay Township despite being member municipalities of Northwest EMS, declined to join MESA, with an intention to find new ambulance service providers. Conewago Township, also a former member of Northwest EMS, declined to join. No new municipalities joined the new Authority.

The loss of territory, but reliable source of revenue, as well as retained employees, meant excellent staffing for the new Authority. This initial situation led to a disproportionate level of "mutual aid" toward municipalities who declined to join MESA, specifically ones who contracted with Penn State Life Lion. On average, for every 911 call a neighboring agency covered in MESA's district, MESA covered 12 911 calls in another agency's district. Instead of billing outside residents directly, MESA billed their respective municipalities. Columbia Borough, Mount Joy Borough, Rapho Township, and West Hempfield Township sued MESA in 2025, arguing that MESA has no legal ground to bill municipalities directly.

== Economy ==
Elizabethtown is home to Continental Press, White Oak Mills (an animal feed plant), Elizabethtown College, the Masonic Village, a large Mars Chocolate North America (a division of Mars, Incorporated) plant, Nordstrom’s east coast fulfillment center, and numerous smaller businesses.

== Demographics ==
Historical population
| Census | Pop. | Note | %± |
|---|---|---|---|
| 1860 | 700 | | — |
| 1870 | 858 | | 22.6% |
| 1880 | 980 | | 14.2% |
| 1890 | 1,218 | | 24.3% |
| 1900 | 1,473 | | 20.9% |
| 1910 | 2,587 | | 75.6% |
| 1920 | 3,319 | | 28.3% |
| 1930 | 3,940 | | 18.7% |
| 1940 | 4,315 | | 9.5% |
| 1950 | 5,083 | | 17.8% |
| 1960 | 6,780 | | 33.4% |
| 1970 | 8,072 | | 19.1% |
| 1980 | 8,233 | | 2.0% |
| 1990 | 9,952 | | 20.9% |
| 2000 | 11,887 | | 19.4% |
| 2010 | 11,545 | | −2.9% |
| 2020 | 11,639 | | 0.8% |
| 2021 (est.) | 11,533 | ▼ | −0.9% |
U.S. Decennial Census

=== 2020 census ===
As of the 2020 census, Elizabethtown had a population of 11,639. The median age was 34.6 years. 18.6% of residents were under the age of 18 and 15.9% of residents were 65 years of age or older. For every 100 females there were 90.3 males, and for every 100 females age 18 and over there were 87.1 males age 18 and over.

100.0% of residents lived in urban areas, while 0.0% lived in rural areas.

There were 4,491 households in Elizabethtown, of which 27.0% had children under the age of 18 living in them. Of all households, 44.8% were married-couple households, 19.2% were households with a male householder and no spouse or partner present, and 28.2% were households with a female householder and no spouse or partner present. About 31.5% of all households were made up of individuals and 12.3% had someone living alone who was 65 years of age or older.

There were 4,665 housing units, of which 3.7% were vacant. The homeowner vacancy rate was 0.7% and the rental vacancy rate was 3.8%.

Racial composition as of the 2020 census
| Race | Number | Percent |
|---|---|---|
| White | 10,217 | 87.8% |
| Black or African American | 296 | 2.5% |
| American Indian and Alaska Native | 13 | 0.1% |
| Asian | 216 | 1.9% |
| Native Hawaiian and Other Pacific Islander | 6 | 0.1% |
| Some other race | 290 | 2.5% |
| Two or more races | 601 | 5.2% |
| Hispanic or Latino (of any race) | 679 | 5.8% |

=== 2000 census ===
As of the census of 2000, there were 11,887 people, 4,271 households, and 2,703 families residing in the borough. The population density was 4,567.4 people per square mile (1,763.5 people/km^{2}). There were 4,483 housing units at an average density of 1,722.5 per square mile (665.1/km^{2}). The racial makeup of the borough was 96.32% White, 0.90% Black or African American, 0.18% Native American, 1.23% Asian, 0.04% Pacific Islander, 0.45% from other races, and 0.87% from two or more races. 1.45% of the population were Hispanic or Latino of any race.

There were 4,271 households, out of which 28.5% had children under the age of 18 living with them, 51.2% were married couples living together, 8.9% had a female householder with no husband present, and 36.7% were non-families. 30.8% of all households were made up of individuals, and 12.5% had someone living alone who was 65 years of age or older. The average household size was 2.31 and the average family size was 2.88.

In the borough the population was spread out, with 19.3% under the age of 18, 18.8% from 18 to 24, 26.7% from 25 to 44, 17.1% from 45 to 64, and 18.2% who were 65 years of age or older. The median age was 34 years. For every 100 females there were 82.2 males. For every 100 females age 18 and over, there were 78.5 males.

The median income for a household in the borough was $42,752, and the median income for a family was $52,214. Males had a median income of $35,764 versus $26,316 for females. The per capita income for the borough was $18,384. About 3.3% of families and 5.2% of the population were below the poverty line, including 6.7% of those under age 18 and 3.9% of those age 65 or over.

== Education ==
Public schools in the borough are part of the Elizabethtown Area School District. Mount Calvary Christian School is just outside the northern borough limits. Elizabethtown College, a private liberal arts institution, provides higher education.

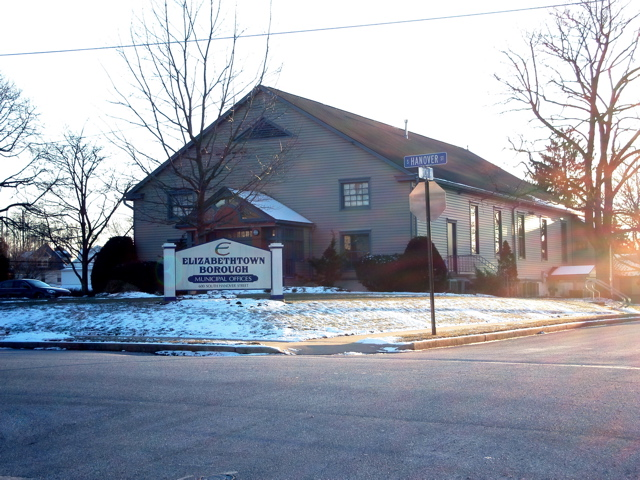
Elizabethtown borough hall

=== Public library ===
- The Elizabethtown Public Library is a member of the Library System of Lancaster County.

== Public media ==
Town newspaper

- The Elizabethtown Advocate

Radio

- WWEC 88.3 FM
- WPDC 1600 AM

Elizabethtown’s school board elections were the primary subject of Auberi Edler’s 2024 documentary An American Pastoral. An article by The Wall Street Journal discussing transgender issues within the town and the aforementioned school board was also published.

== Transportation ==
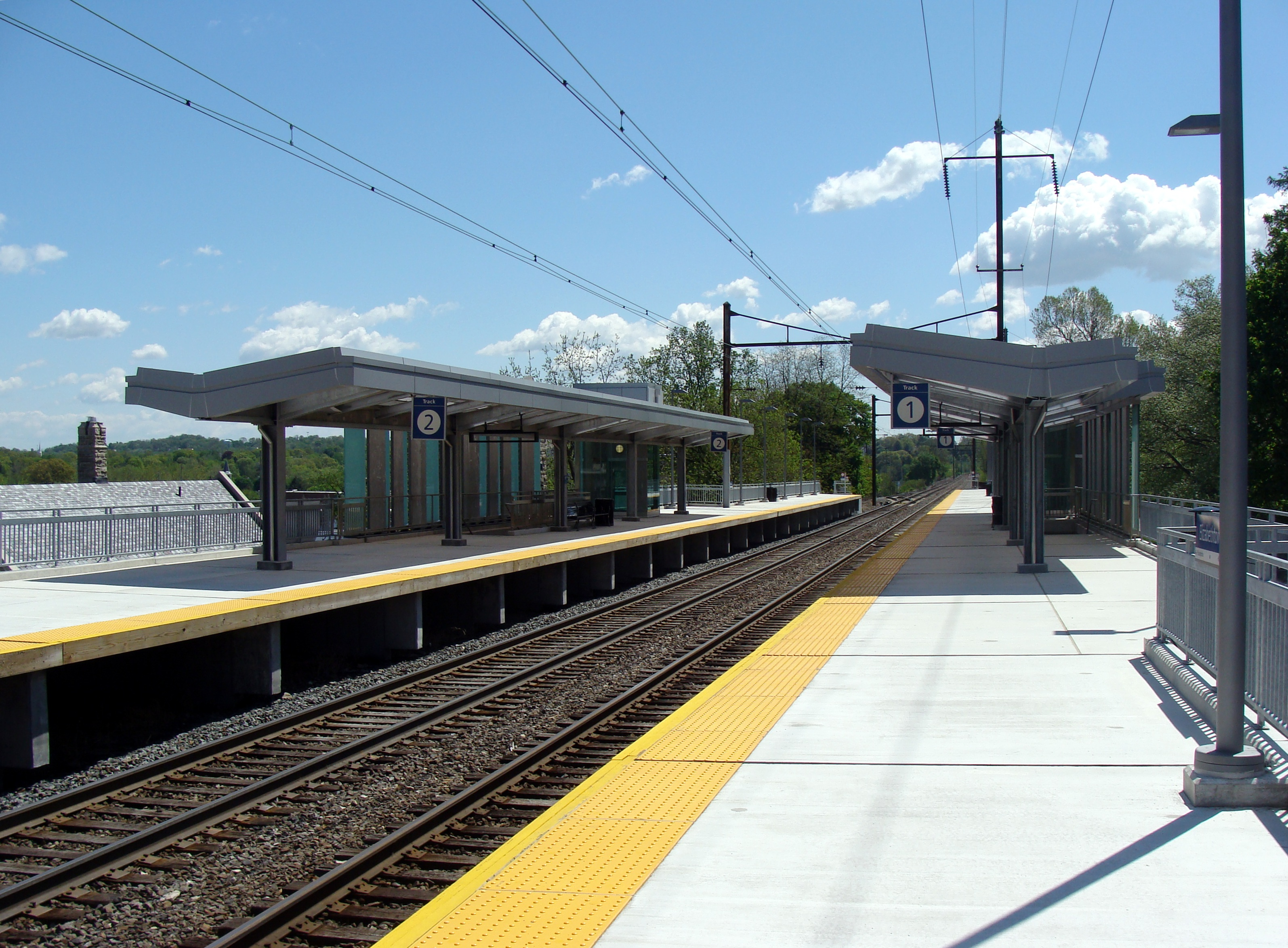
Elizabethtown Amtrak station

Elizabethtown is served by an Amtrak station, where all Keystone Service and Pennsylvanian trains stop. Bus service is provided by the Red Rose Transit Authority, which operates the Route 18 bus to Lancaster.

State routes PA-230, PA-241, and PA-743 run through the borough. The PA-283 freeway mostly bypasses the borough to the northeast, going through Mount Joy Township, but a small portion goes through the borough.

== Sister city ==
- (Republic of Ireland) Letterkenny, Ireland

== Annual fair ==
Elizabethtown hosts an annual fair to show off the local agriculture that has impacted the town since its founding. It has given families, friends, and tourists a fun and lively environment for over 50 years. The fair provides fundraising and a promotional tool for local churches, committees, and businesses. It is held in late August beside East High Elementary and Elizabethtown Brethren in Christ Church.

== Notable people ==
- Nelson Chittum, former Major League Baseball pitcher
- Gene Garber, former Major League Baseball pitcher
- Paul Gottfried, political scientist
- Donald Kraybill, educator and author on Anabaptist groups, in particular the Amish
- Tony Mrakovich, racing driver
- Winifred Reuning, science writer
- Blake Shearer, homicide victim
