= West Donegal Township, Pennsylvania =

Township in Pennsylvania, US

Coordinates: 40°08′00″N 76°37′59″W

- Township
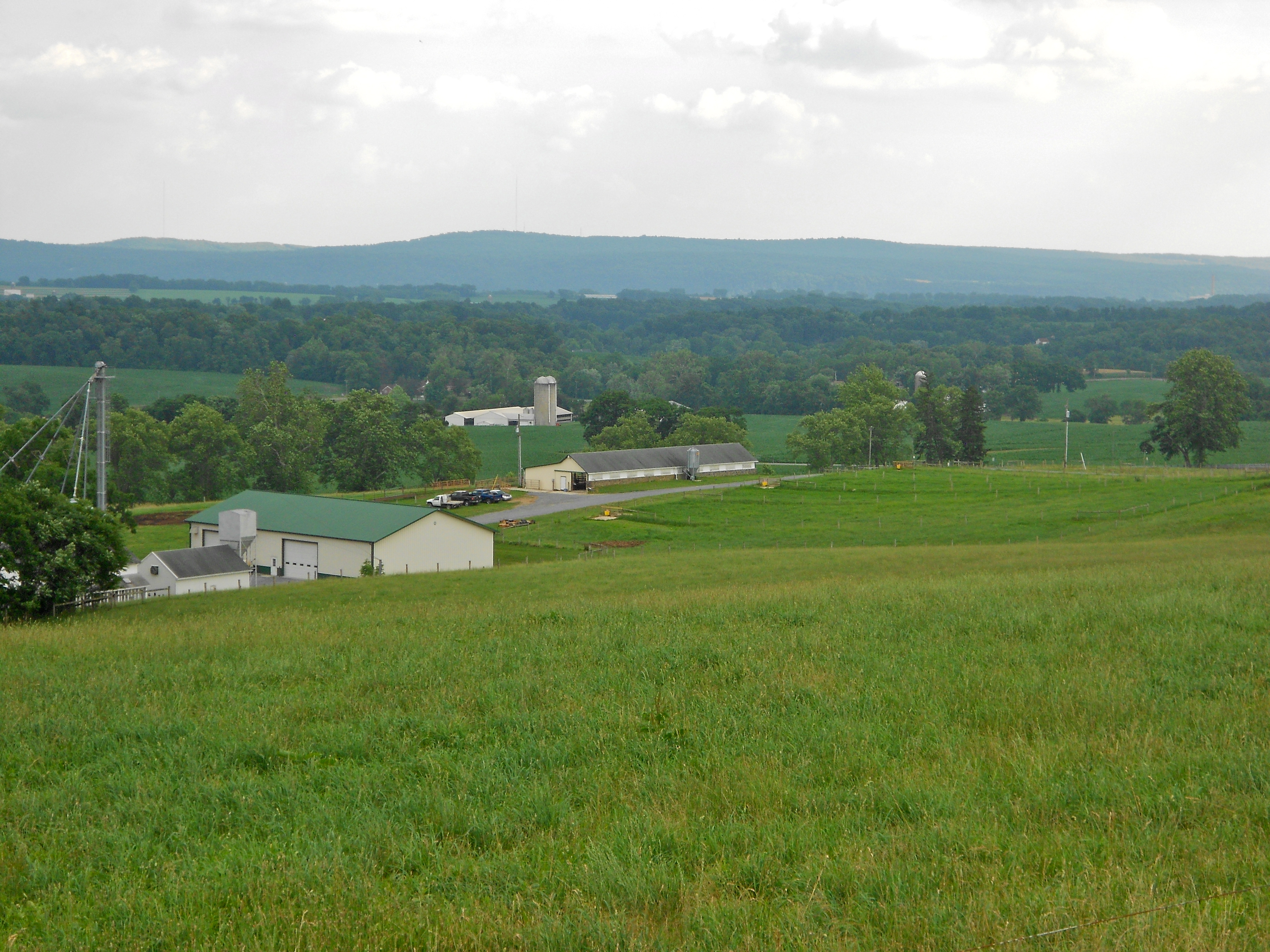
- View south toward York County

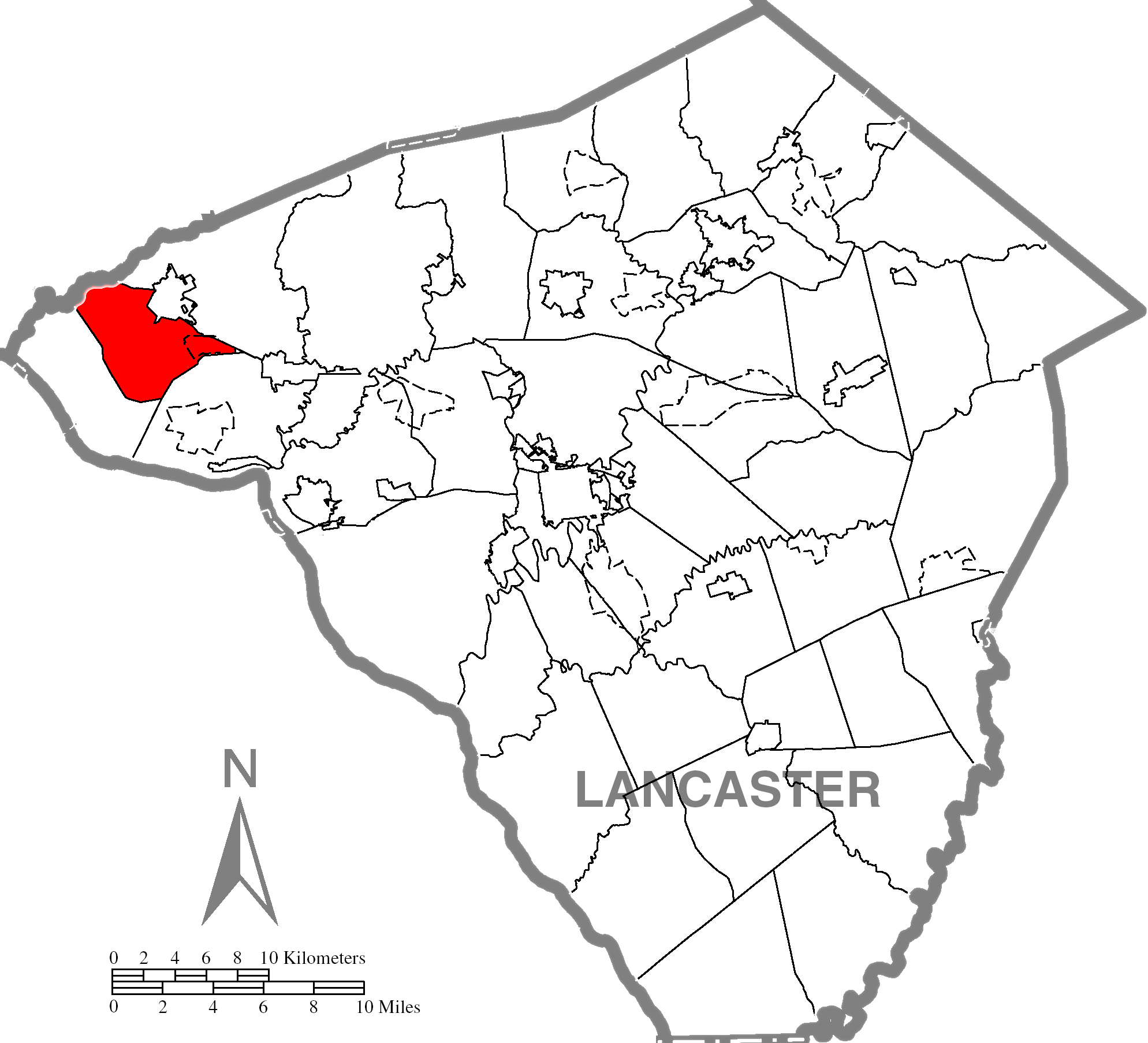
- Map of Lancaster County, Pennsylvania highlighting West Donegal Township

- Map of Lancaster County, Pennsylvania
- Country: United States
- State: Pennsylvania
- County: Lancaster
- Settled: 1719
- Incorporated: 1838

Government
  - Type: Board of Supervisors

Area
  - Total: 15.85 sq mi (41.06 km^{2})
  - Land: 15.78 sq mi (40.87 km^{2})
  - Water: 0.073 sq mi (0.19 km^{2})

Population (2020)
  - Total: 8,870 ▲
  - Estimate (2021): 8,926
  - Density: 552.6/sq mi (213.35/km^{2})
- Time zone: UTC-5 (Eastern (EST))
  - Summer (DST): UTC-4 (EDT)
- FIPS code: 42-071-82816
- Website: wdtwp.com

West Donegal Township is a township in northwestern Lancaster County, Pennsylvania, United States. The population was 8,870 at the 2020 census.

== History ==
The township derives its name from Donegal, a town in Ireland. The original township of Donegal was organized by the court of Chester County in 1722, and was one of the two townships which composed Lancaster County at the time of its erection in 1729. On June 24, 1838, a division was effected, whereby the old township was constituted into two townships, to be separately and distinctly recognized as East Donegal and West Donegal.

== R.E. Pierson Quarry Controversy ==
R.E. Pierson Materials is a corporation from New Jersey that has a location in Rheems, a town in West Donegal. They are recently facing controversy for their ongoing attempt to expand their quarry into thirty acres of farmland.

== History ==
The settlers of West Donegal were of Scots-Irish descent and were primarily farmers who were drawn to the area by the rich soils and plentiful streams. Thus the abundant produce provided by the land was able to be made into flour by the many mills which sprang up in the area.

Early settlers, Arthur Patterson and others, organized a Presbyterian Church at Donegal in 1726, and erected the old church edifice at that time. The first three pastors of it were from Scotland. Bartram Galbraith, grandson of James Galbraith, was Lieutenant for Lancaster County, the first three years of the Revolution, and many members of that family served in various official positions, as also did Alexander Lowrey and several of that family.

== Geography ==
According to the U.S. Census Bureau, the township has a total area of 15.6 square miles (40.3 km^{2}), all land. It is named after County Donegal, Ireland. The northwestern border of the township, which is also the border with Dauphin County, is formed by Conewago Creek. The township is bordered to the northeast by the borough of Elizabethtown. Unincorporated communities in the township include Conewago, Newville, and Rheems

== Demographics ==
Historical population
Census	Pop.	Note	%±
2000	6,539		—
2010	8,260		26.3%
2020	8,870		7.4%
2021 (est.)	8,926		0.6%
U.S. Decennial Census

As of the census of 2000, there were 6,539 people, 2,474 households, and 1,882 families residing in the township. The population density was 420.1 inhabitants per square mile (162.2/km^{2}). There were 2,560 housing units at an average density of 164.5 units per square mile (63.5 units/km^{2}). The racial makeup of the township was 98.24% White, 0.28% African American, 0.09% Native American, 0.46% Asian, 0.05% Pacific Islander, 0.26% from other races, and 0.63% from two or more races. Hispanic or Latino of any race were 0.70% of the population.

There were 2,474 households, out of which 33.6% had children under the age of 18 living with them, 70.0% were married couples living together, 3.7% had a female householder with no husband present, and 23.9% were non-families. 21.7% of all households were made up of individuals, and 15.0% had someone living alone who was 65 years of age or older. The average household size was 2.61 and the average family size was 3.04.

In the township the population was spread out, with 25.4% under the age of 18, 5.9% from 18 to 24, 28.0% from 25 to 44, 21.6% from 45 to 64, and 19.0% who were 65 years of age or older. The median age was 40 years. For every 100 females, there were 96.2 males. For every 100 females age 18 and over, there were 93.6 males.

The median income for a household in the township was $53,935, and the median income for a family was $61,011. Males had a median income of $42,313 versus $25,653 for females. The per capita income for the township was $22,545. About 0.4% of families and 1.6% of the population were below the poverty line, including 0.5% of those under age 18 and 4.5% of those age 65 or over.

== Notable person ==
- David Hickernell, Pennsylvania State Representative
